= Canton of Champagne-en-Valromey =

Coordinates: 45°54′16″N 5°40′46″E

Champagne-en-Valromey
- Former canton
- Interactive map of Champagne-en-Valromey
- Country: France
- Region: Auvergne-Rhône-Alpes
- Department: Ain
- No. of communes: {{{nbcomm}}}
- Disbanded: 2015
- Area: 169.32 km^{2} (65.37 sq mi)
- Population (2012): 5,115
  - Density: 30.21/km^{2} (78.24/sq mi)

The canton of Champagne-en-Valromey is a former administrative division in eastern France. It was disbanded following the French canton reorganisation which came into effect in March 2015. It consisted of 14 communes, which joined the canton of Plateau d'Hauteville in 2015. It had 5,115 inhabitants (2012).

The canton comprised 14 communes:

- Artemare
- Belmont-Luthézieu
- Béon
- Brénaz
- Champagne-en-Valromey
- Chavornay
- Lochieu
- Lompnieu
- Ruffieu
- Songieu
- Sutrieu
- Talissieu
- Vieu
- Virieu-le-Petit

== Demographics ==
Historical population Canton of Champagne-en-Valromey
Year	1962	1968	1975	1982	1990	1999
Pop.	3,814	4,196	3,967	4,095	4,147	4,382
±%	—	+10.0%	−5.5%	+3.2%	+1.3%	+5.7%
From the year 1962 on: No double counting – residents of multiple communes (e.g. students and military personnel) are counted only once. Source: INSEE

== See also ==
- Cantons of the Ain department
- Communes of France
