= Artemare =

Commune in Auvergne-Rhône-Alpes, France

- Commune
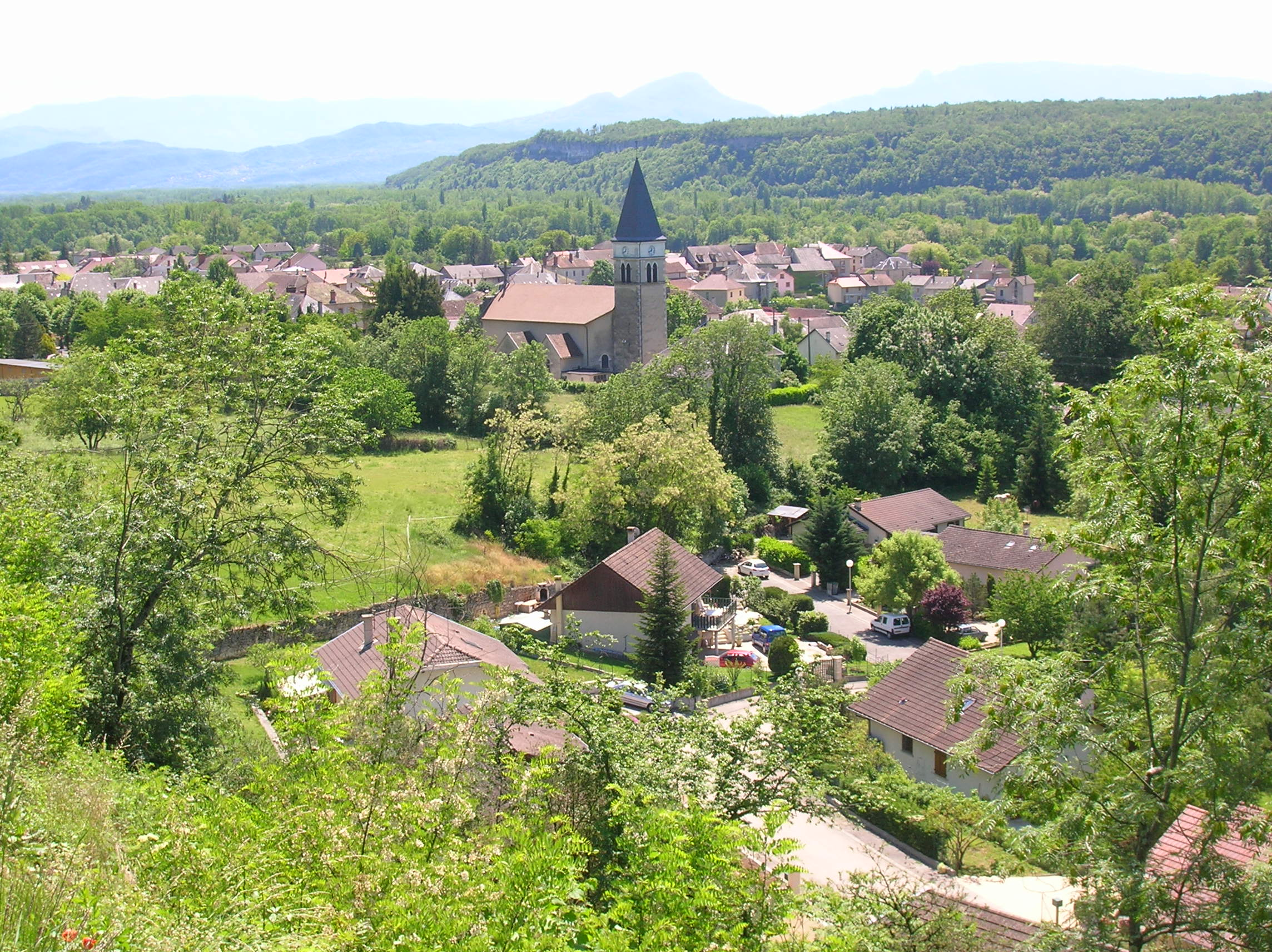

- Coat of arms
- Location of Artemare
- Location within France Location within Auvergne-Rhône-Alpes
- Coordinates: 45°52′31″N 5°41′37″E
- Country: France
- Region: Auvergne-Rhône-Alpes
- Department: Ain
- Arrondissement: Belley
- Canton: Plateau d'Hauteville
- Intercommunality: Bugey Sud

Government
  - Mayor (2026–32): Roland Deschamps
- Area^{1}: 3.75 km^{2} (1.45 sq mi)
- Elevation: 258 m (846 ft)
- Highest elevation: 360 m (1,180 ft)
- Lowest elevation: 242 m (794 ft)
- Population (2023): 1,139
  - Density: 304/km^{2} (787/sq mi)
- Time zone: UTC+01:00 (CET)
  - Summer (DST): UTC+02:00 (CEST)
- INSEE/Postal code: 01022 /01510
- Website: https://www.artemare.fr/
- ^{1} French Land Register data, which excludes lakes, ponds, glaciers > 1 km^{2} (0.386 sq mi or 247 acres) and river estuaries.

Artemare (French pronunciation: [aʁtəmaʁ]) is a commune in the Ain department in the Auvergne-Rhône-Alpes region of eastern France.

== Geography ==
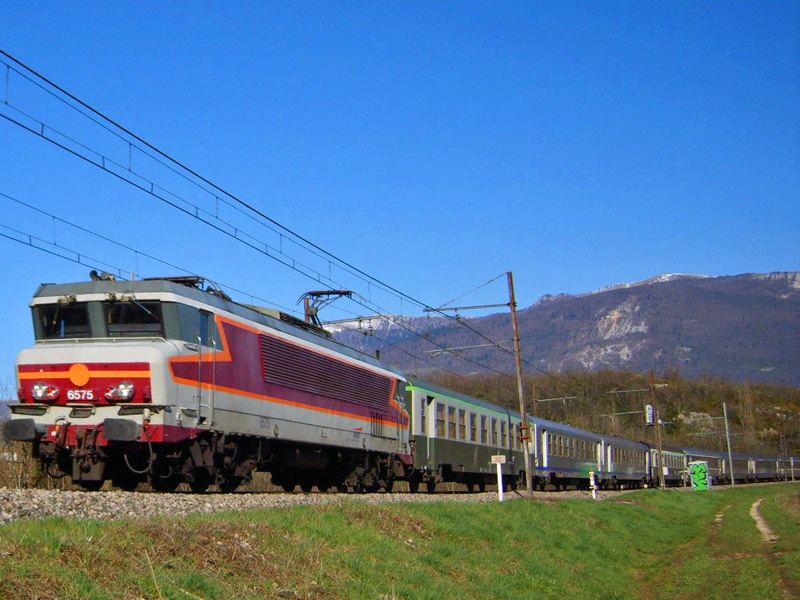
A train passing through Artemare to Lyon

Artemare is a commune in Valromey 16 km north of Belley and 8 km north-west of Culoz and the Rhône. Artemare is exposed to the south between two chains of the Jura Mountains: the Planachat in the west and the Colombier culminating in Grand-Colombier (1538 m) to the east.

This village is between Lower-Bugey and Upper-Bugey not far from Savoie and Isère.

The commune can be accessed from several roads: the D69D from Champdossin-Massignieu in the west, the D31L from Pont in the north, and the D904 from Ameyzieu in the east which continues south from the village to Virieu-le-Grand. The main railway line from Modane to Lyon passes through the south of the commune from west to east. Apart from the village, which has quite a large urban area, and the hamlet of Cerveyrieu, the rest of the commune is mixed farmland and forest.

Artemare is watered by a network of four rivers:

- the River Yon, enclosed in a canal through the village and used to work sawmills and to feed trout ponds. It flows into the Séran which is a tributary of the Rhone which it joins near Culoz
- the Séran traverses the hamlet of Cerveyrieu which gives its name to a waterfall about fifty metres high
- the Arvière (locally called the Groin) forms a confluence with the Seran.
- the Ruisseau de l'Eau Morte (Dead Water)

The Groin and the Séran cut deeply into the limestone terrain. The Groin rises in the commune of Vieu from an intermittent source before forming a deep canyon visible from Devil's Bridge in Vieu. The Séran rises upstream of the Cerveyrieu waterfall from Giant's kettles where water swirls around - but only when the Seran is not dry.

== History ==
According to Louis Berthelon, Artemare was first "a small group of dwellings located above a hill called Molard" and it was this "wonderful location overlooking the vast marshes extending from Bourget to Cerveyrieu earning it its name of Altemare meaning "Upper Sea" ", later becoming Artemare. Local tradition has it that Saint Martin evangelized the region which had until then indulged in pagan cults. The church of Artemare is dedicated to him and he also gave his name to a neighbouring village - Saint-Martin-de-Bavel.

The Gallic and Roman periods were the origin of many current placenames, especially those ending in -ieu which comes from the suffix -acum of Gallic origin. For example, Talissieu comes from the anthroponym Talussus and the word for son Donnus gives Don etc. Invading armies, particularly by the saracens, who occupied the plateau of Fierloz are not only the origin of the name of the locality "under the Carraz" but, according to Louis Berthelon, became part of the population. Struck by the plagues of the Middle Ages and after having been a direct domain of the Counts and Dukes of Savoy, Valromey was occupied from 1536 to 1559 by François I then Henry II and, from 1595 to 1601, by Henry IV. It became permanently French by the Treaty of Lyon on 17 January 1601 along with Bresse, Bugey and the Gex country well before neighbouring Savoy which was linked to France by Napoleon III in 1860.

In 1612 the writer Honoré d'Urfé inherited from his mother (who was born Renée de Savoie) the first title of Marquis of Valromey (Verromey in local dialect). This name appears in the text under the names:

- Verrumensi (1110)
- Veromensi (1142)
- Verrometum (1169)

The name probably derives from Venetonimagus or the older Vernemetonimagos meaning "Market of the Grand Shrine"(?). The etymology of Vallis Romana meaning "Roman valley" was the invention of Latin scholars.

Cerveyrieu, Yon, Artemare, and Ameyzieu parish included Artemare until the French Revolution. They were still small villages until the dissolution of the commune of Ameyzieu in 1862 (now the commune of Talissieu) and the formation of the Yon-Artemare. From 1 January 1886 the commune took the name of Artemare only.

The commune or, more precisely at the time, the parishes of Yon and Cerveyrieu was known for its manufacture of flat-bottomed boats which could reach the port of Culoz on the Rhône via the Séran particularly for the timber trade. A "Tramway of Bugey" (steam train) operated between Virieu-le-Grand and Ruffieu via the "Incline of Artemare" from 1898 to 1933. On 29 December 1923 there was an accident at La Faverge (Champagne-en-Valromey) causing the death of a mechanic and driver.

As recalled by the war memorials of the town, many residents of Artemare died during the two world wars. During the Second World War a Kommandantur was resident at the Hotel Berrard (now Michallet). The maquis of Upper Valromey was close and during the German occupation they attacked a Chantier de Jeunesse camp to procure equipment. A monument on the side of the road through the Lèbe mountain pass near Bioléaz with twenty headstones or plaques on places where Resistance fighters had been detained or killed testifies to the commitment of the people of Artemare and its surrounding area to the Resistance. After the Liberation, a German POW camp was installed above the village (currently a plastics factory).

== Administration ==
List of Mayors of Artemare

| From | To | Name |
|---|---|---|
| 1995 | 2001 | André Gonguet |
| 2001 | 2020 | Mireille Charmont-Munet |
| 2020 | Present | Roland Deschamps |

== Population ==
Historical population
| Year | Pop. | ±% p.a. |
|---|---|---|
| 1968 | 838 | — |
| 1975 | 810 | −0.48% |
| 1982 | 914 | +1.74% |
| 1990 | 961 | +0.63% |
| 1999 | 970 | +0.10% |
| 2007 | 1,081 | +1.36% |
| 2012 | 1,175 | +1.68% |
| 2017 | 1,237 | +1.03% |
| 2023 | 1,139 | −1.37% |
Source: INSEE

== Economy ==
The town has many shops and stores.

== Sights ==
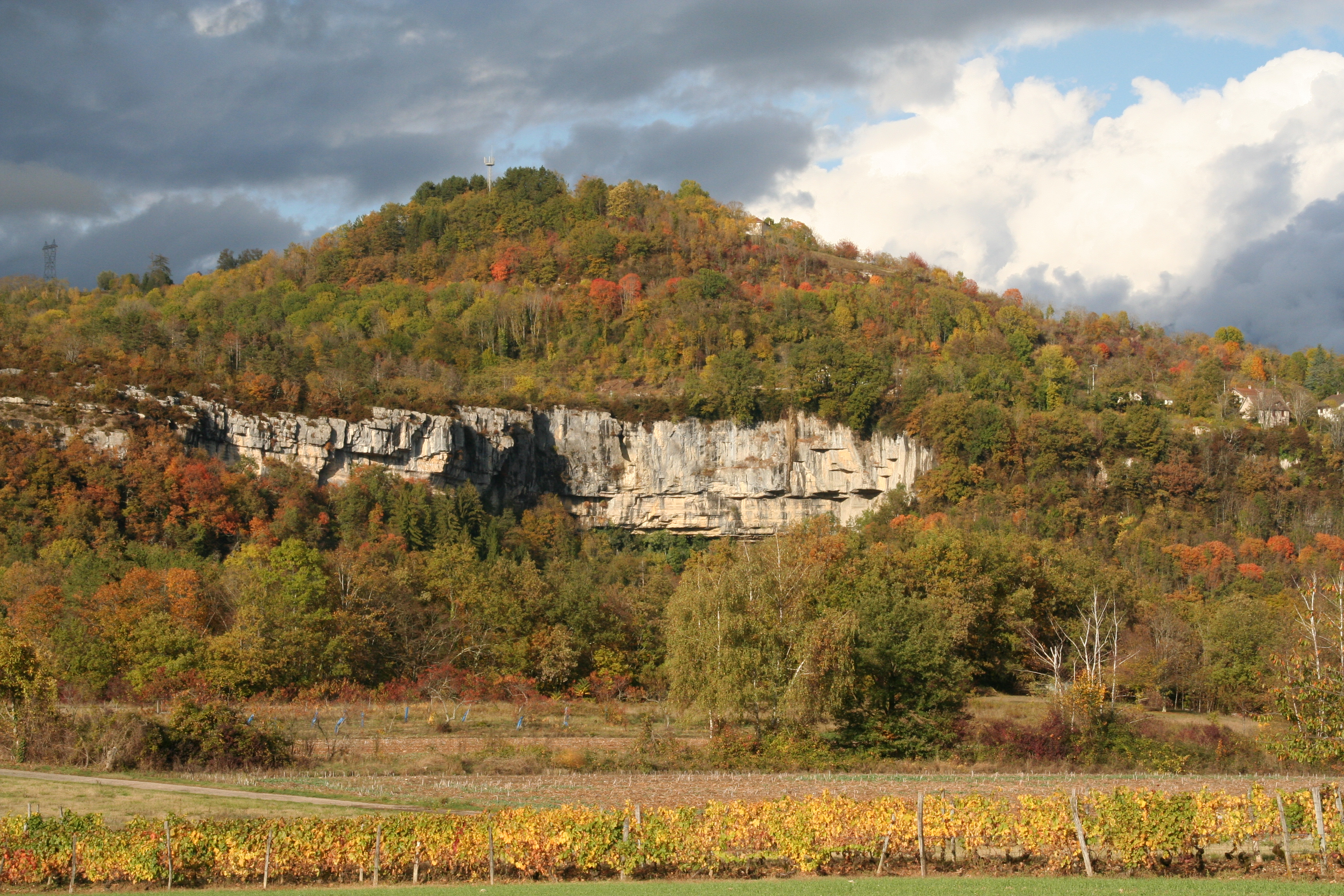
The Waterfall in Autumn

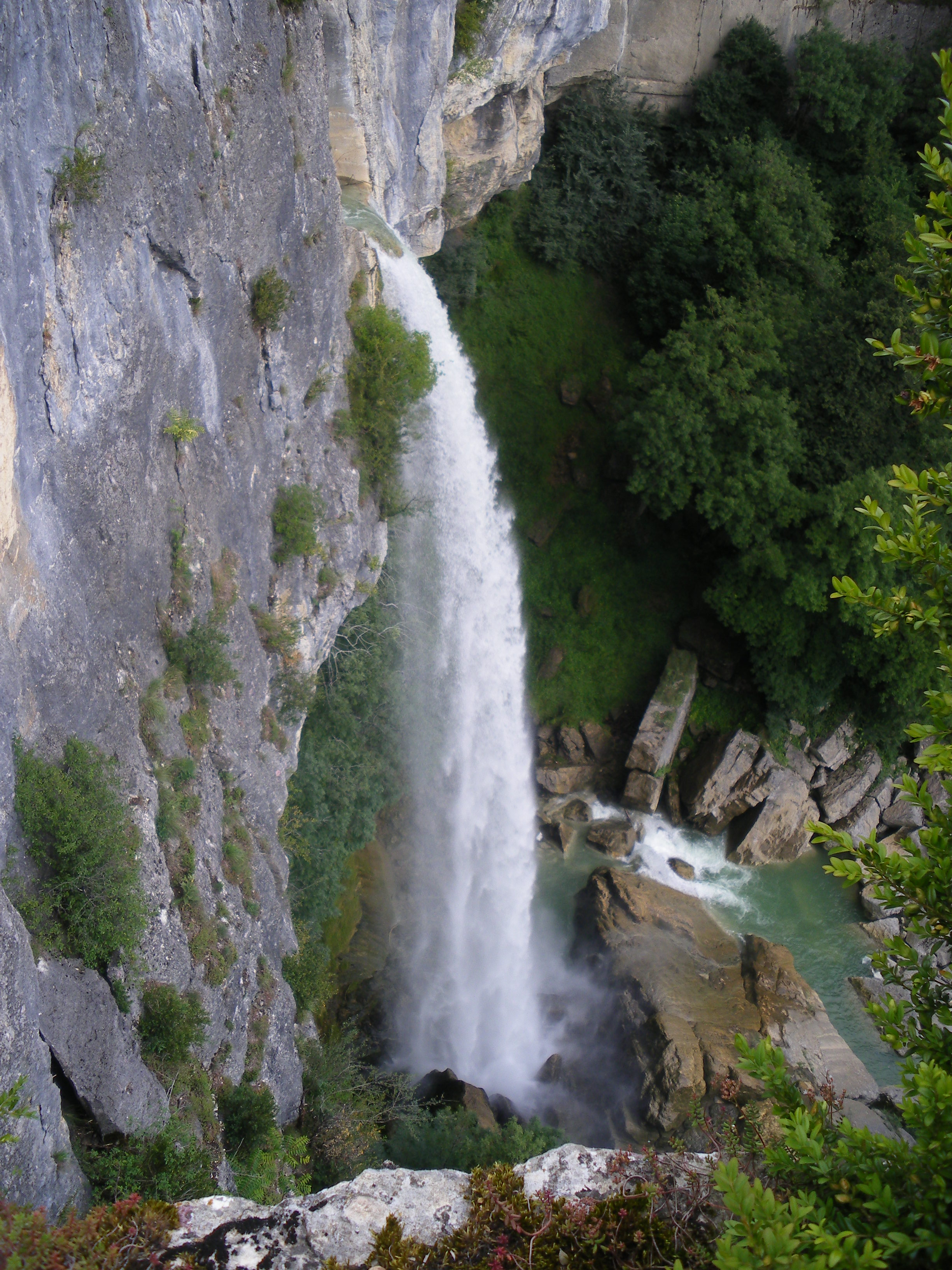
Cerveyrieu Waterfall

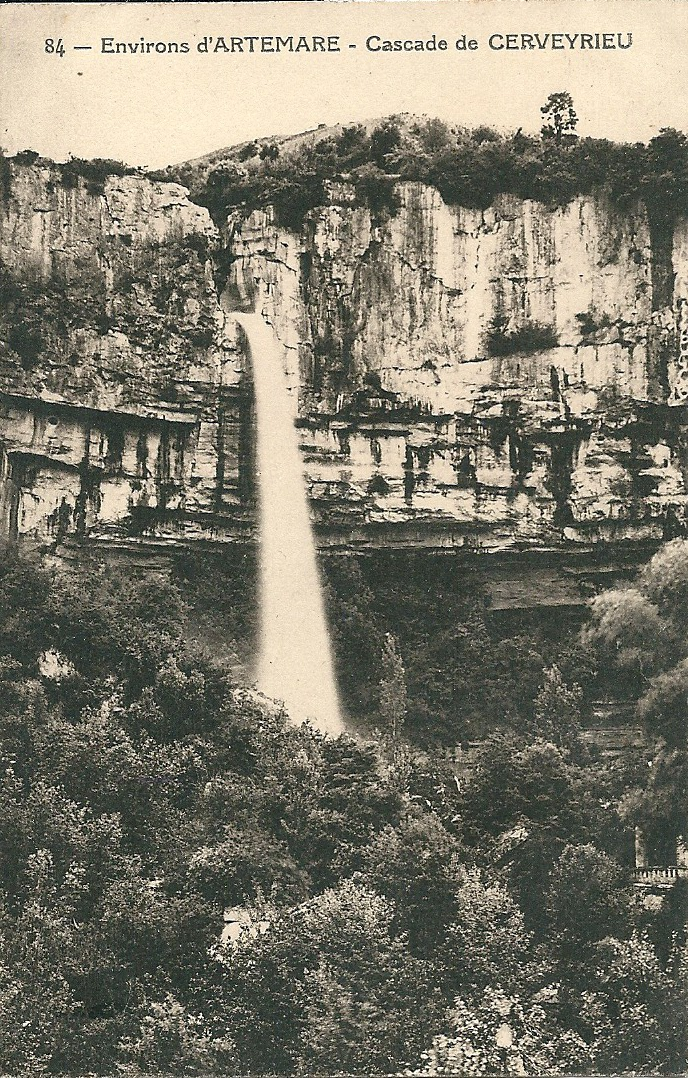
Cerveyrieu Waterfall in 1929

- The Clos Lambert (Lambert Enclosure), once a stronghold of the Knights of Seyssel, replaced by a renaissance house in the second half of the 16th century. Today it is an ESAT (Establishment and Aid services through Work). The roof, basement, a small house of the 16th century, and a mullioned window escaped the vicissitudes of history
- The Cascade of Cerveyrieu is fuller during floods on the Seran river
- The Cuve à Balthazar (Pit at Balthazar), an abyss at Groin between Don and Artemare. The micro-power plant built just below the pit decreases the flow for part of the year because of the water intake upstream
- The Castle of Mâchuraz in the commune of Vieu (16th century, restored in the 19th century), its round tower dominates the entrance to the village of Artemare when arriving from the west. The vineyard developed by the Abbey of Saint-Sulpice provided renowned wines of Bugey
- At Cerveyrieu is a 16th-century house under renovation for several years in the internal courtyard and the hexagonal tower, the rest being in poor condition and abandoned. The polygonal tower still bears the date 1572;
- A restored Oven and Lavoir (Public laundry).
- The Vierge of Fierloz (pronounced "Fiarle") is a karst formation on which there are traces of saracen camps.

== Personalities ==
- Adolphe Appian (1818-1898), painter of the Lyon School who spent many summers at Artemare and painted many sites of Valromey. Some of his paintings are exhibited in the museum of the Monastery of Brou.

== Events ==
On 10 September 2009 President Nicolas Sarkozy visited the commune when he formalized the establishment from 1 January 2010 of the carbon tax advocated by the report of Michel Rocard.

== See also ==
- Communes of the Ain department

=== External links ===
- Artemare official website (in French)
- Valromey-Retord Tourist Office (in French)
- Artemare on the old National Geographic Institute website (in French)
- Artemare on Géoportail, National Geographic Institute (IGN) website (in French)
- Altemare on the 1750 Cassini Map
