= Col du Grand Colombier =

Mountain pass in France

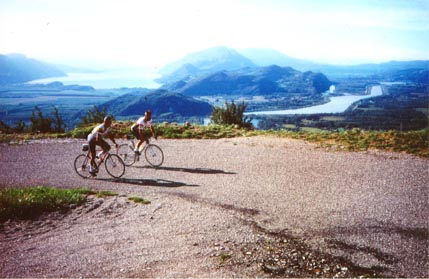
- Cyclists ascending the pass

- Location within France Location within Alps
- Elevation: 1,498 m (4,915 ft)
- Traversed by: D120

Location
- Location: Ain, France
- Range: Jura Mountains
- Coordinates: 45°54′12.44″N 05°45′41.93″E

Col du Grand Colombier (el. 1,498 metres or 4,915 feet) is a mountain pass in the Jura Mountains in France.

This pass lies at the southern extremity of the Jura in the massif of the Grand Colombier. With the Col du Chasseral, it is the highest road pass in the Jura. It passes between the Grand Colombier (el. 1,531 m (5,023 ft)) and the Croix du Colombier (1,525 m (5,003 ft)), which is accessible by trail from the pass.

The view from the summit is superb, either down the valley of the Rhône, the Lac du Bourget and the gorges of Val-de-Fier, or the distant peaks of the Alps.

== Cycle racing ==
It is one of the most difficult passes in France, with stretches in excess of 20% on the climb from Artemare via Virieu-le-Petit on the Bugey (western) side. The ascent is 15.9 km (9.9 mi) long, gaining 1,245 m (4,085 ft) in elevation at an average gradient of 7.8%, The pass has seen frequent use in cycling, being a regular feature of the Tour de l'Ain and also used in the Critérium du Dauphiné and Tour de l'Avenir.

From Culoz (south), the ascent is 18.3 km (11.4 mi) long, gaining 1,255 m (4,117 ft) in elevation at an average gradient of 6.9%, but with some sections at 12%. This climb is the direction used on Stage 5 of the 2012 Critérium du Dauphiné and Stage 10 of the 2012 Tour de France.

The Col can also be reached from Anglefort (east), from where it is 15.2 km (9.4 mi) in length, climbing 1,205 m (3,953 ft) at an average grade of 7.9% with maximum gradient of 14%

=== Tour de France ===
It was visited by the Tour de France for the first time on Stage 10 of the 2012 Tour as a Hors Catégorie climb. The leader over the summit was Thomas Voeckler, who went on to take the stage victory in Bellegarde-sur-Valserine. Stage 15 of the 2020 Tour finished atop the pass. The stage was won by Tadej Pogacar, the eventual general classification winner of that year's race. It returned on stage 13 of the 2023 Tour de France as a finish atop the mountain.

=== Tour de France stage finishes ===
Year	Stage	Start of stage	Distance (km)	Category	Stage winner	Leader in general classification
2020	15	Lyon	174.5	HC	Tadej Pogačar (SLO)	Primož Roglič (SLO)
2023	13	Châtillon-sur-Chalaronne	138	HC	Michal Kwiatkowski (POL)	Jonas Vingegaard (DEN)

=== Other appearances in Tour de France ===
Year	Stage	Category	Start	Finish	Leader at the summit
2012	10	HC	Mâcon	Bellegarde-sur-Valserine	Thomas Voeckler (FRA)
2016	15	HC	Bourg-en-Bresse	Culoz	Rafal Majka (POL)
2017	9	HC	Nantua	Chambéry	Warren Barguil (FRA)
