= Mad Love (2015 film) =

2015 film by Philippe Ramos

- Film poster
- Directed by: Philippe Ramos
- Written by: Philippe Ramos
- Produced by: Paulo Branco
- Starring: Melvil Poupaud; Dominique Blanc; Diane Rouxel
- Cinematography: Philippe Ramos
- Edited by: Philippe Ramos
- Music by: Pierre-Stéphane Meugé
- Production companies: Alfama Films; Rhône-Alpes Cinéma
- Distributed by: Alfama Films
- Release dates: 24 August 2015 (Gindou Film Festival); 16 September 2015 (France)
- Running time: 107 minutes
- Country: France
- Language: French

Mad Love (original title: Fou d'amour) is a 2015 French drama film directed by Philippe Ramos and starring Melvil Poupaud, Dominique Blanc and Diane Rouxel. It is an adaptation of Ramos' 1996 short film Ici-bas, which was in turn inspired by the Affair of the Uruffe priest in the 1950s. It won the Grand Prix des Amériques at the Montreal World Film Festival.

== Plot ==
Set in France in 1959, a man who is convicted of a double murder is guillotined and subsequently the detached head begins to recount the events leading to his death.

== Cast ==
- Melvil Poupaud as the Priest
- Dominique Blanc as Armance
- Diane Rouxel as Rose
- Lise Lamétrie as Lisette
- Jean-François Stévenin as the Priest of Mantaille
- J.P. 'Van Gogh' Bodet as Félix the postman
- Jacques Bonnaffé as the great vicar
- Virginie Petit as Mademoiselle Desboine
- Nathalie Tetrel as Jacqueline the milkmaid
- Vanina Delannoy as Solange the cousin
- Anaïs Lesoil as Odette

== Production ==
Filming took place during the summer of 2014 in the Ain department, including Champagne-en-Valromey as well as in Belmont-Luthézieu, Virieu-le-Petit, Ceyzérieu, Virignin, Oncieu, Condon, Chanaz.
