= Anglefort =

Commune in Auvergne-Rhône-Alpes, France

- Commune
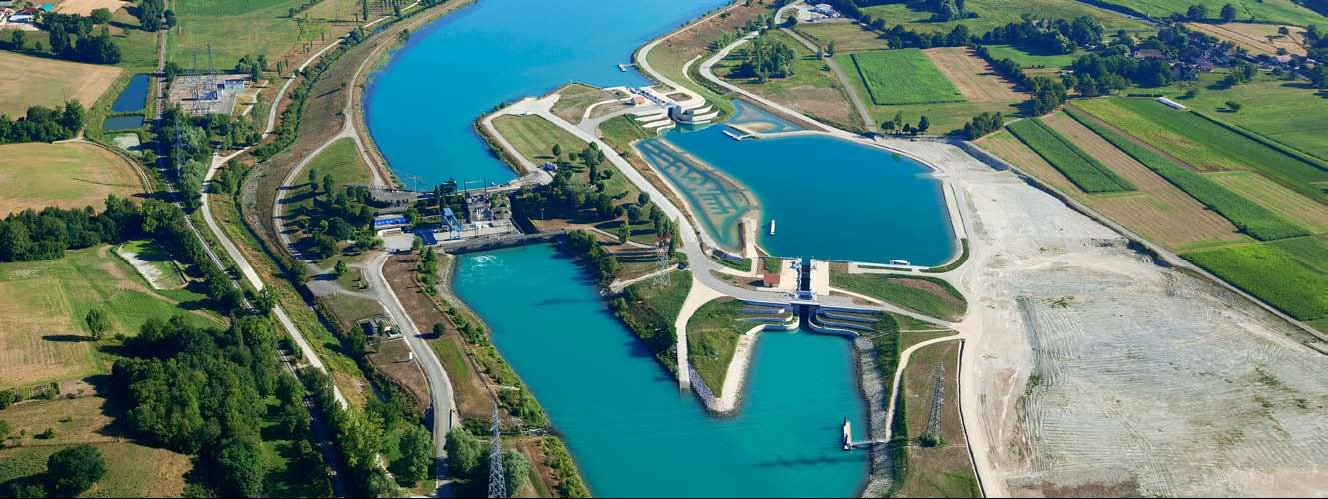
- Chautagne lock on the Rhone
- Location of Anglefort
- Location within France Location within Auvergne-Rhône-Alpes
- Coordinates: 45°54′47″N 5°48′33″E
- Country: France
- Region: Auvergne-Rhône-Alpes
- Department: Ain
- Arrondissement: Belley
- Canton: Plateau d'Hauteville
- Intercommunality: Usses et Rhône

Government
  - Mayor (2026–32): Henri Plé
- Area^{1}: 29.26 km^{2} (11.30 sq mi)
- Elevation: 251 m (823 ft)
- Highest elevation: 1,524 m (5,000 ft)
- Lowest elevation: 238 m (781 ft)
- Population (2023): 1,174
  - Density: 40.12/km^{2} (103.9/sq mi)
- Time zone: UTC+01:00 (CET)
  - Summer (DST): UTC+02:00 (CEST)
- INSEE/Postal code: 01010 /01350
- Website: https://www.anglefort.fr/
- ^{1} French Land Register data, which excludes lakes, ponds, glaciers > 1 km^{2} (0.386 sq mi or 247 acres) and river estuaries.

Anglefort (French pronunciation: [ɑ̃ɡləfɔʁ]) is a commune in the department of Ain in the Auvergne-Rhône-Alpes region of central-eastern France.

== Geography ==
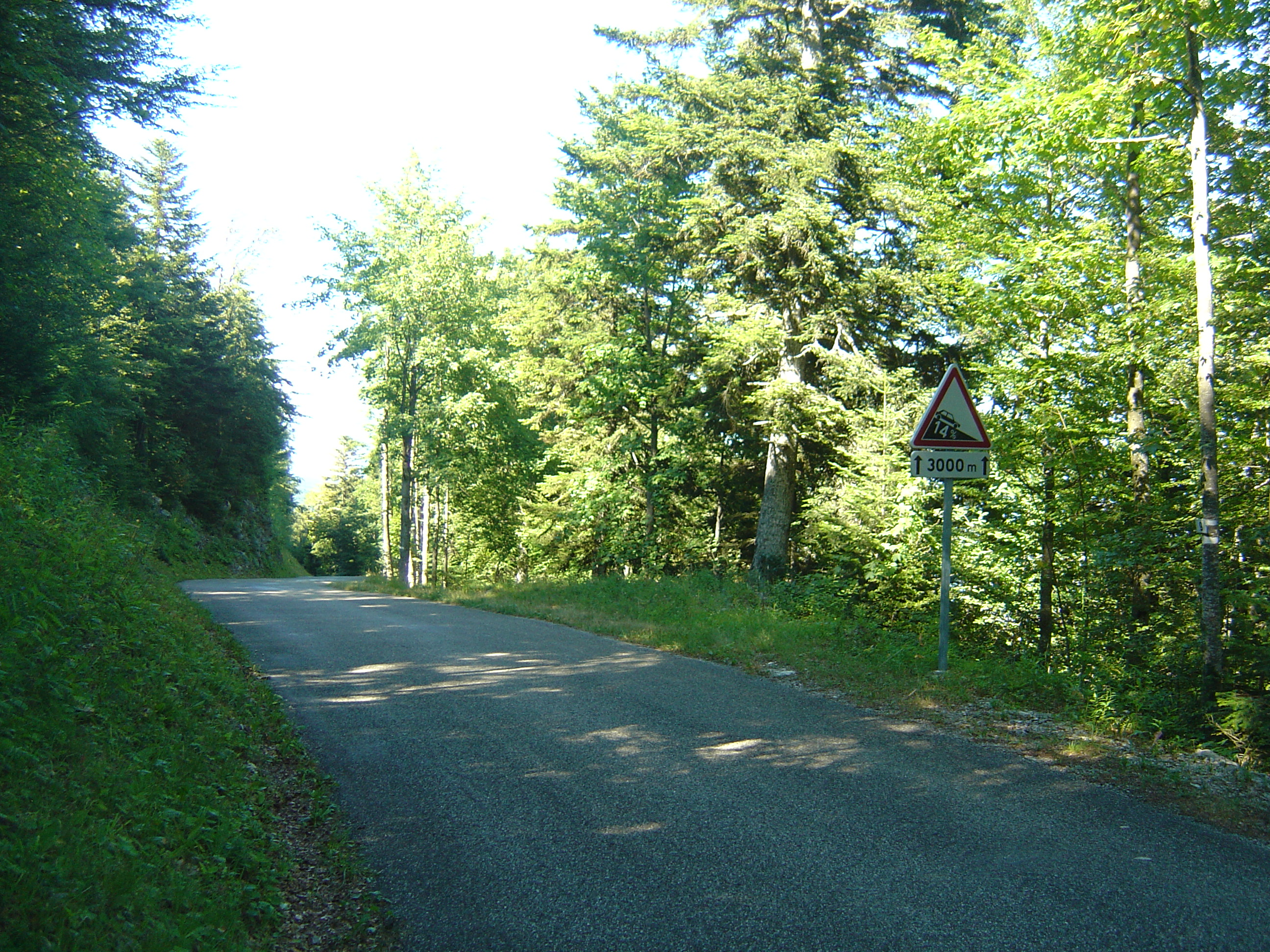
A steep stretch on the D120 through the Col du Grand Colombier.

Anglefort is a commune in Bugey on the right bank of the Rhone at the foot of the mountain of Grand Colombier which has a panorama of the Alps and the Jura Mountains.

The commune is located 25 km south of Bellegarde-sur-Valserine and 30 km north by north-west of Aix-les-Bains. Access to the commune is by road D 992 from Seyssel in the north passing through the length of the commune and the village to Culoz in the south. There is also access on road D 120 which is a highly circuitous route from Lochieu in the west continuing to the village as the D 120^{A} and continuing south through the Col du Grand Colombier (1,501m) to Culoz. A railway line passes through the commune from north to south with a station to the east of the village.

The Rhône river runs south along the eastern border of the commune and Le Verdet stream flows from the north to the south of the commune into the Rhone.

=== Environment ===
The alluvial aquifer fed by the Rhone is threatened by an internal discharge created by the Pechiney Group. Foundry waste, metal dust, and recovered acid from filters have been buried in the Chautagnard marsh with a probable contamination by heavy metals and arsenic.

== History ==
The Priory of Anglefort was located on the communal territory in the Middle Ages. In 1590 Guillaume Drujon was a priest and he became abbot in 1620.

== Administration ==
List of mayors of Anglefort

From	To	Name	Party
1995	2001	Michel Thiboud	
2001	2008	René Perrier	
2008	2026	Bernard Thiboud	DVD
2026	Present	Henri Plé	

== Population ==
Historical population
Year	Pop.	±% p.a.
1968	528	—
1975	697	+4.05%
1982	714	+0.34%
1990	687	−0.48%
1999	769	+1.26%
2007	918	+2.24%
2012	1,069	+3.09%
2017	1,115	+0.85%
2023	1,174	+0.86%
Source: INSEE

== Economy ==
The Électricité de France (EDF) Dam is on the Rhone river in the territory of the commune and there is a factory producing silicon. Formerly the property of the Pechiney Electro-metallurgy group, the factory has passed successively into the hands of Alcan (Canada), and the Anglo-Australian Rio Tinto at the whim of successive buy-backs of this former French industrial flagship.

== Sights ==
- Two sites are registered as historical monuments in the commune:
  - The old Château of Anglefort (18th century) formerly the seat of the Lordship of Anglefort and rebuilt in 1741.
  - The Château of Mieugy Park
- The remains of the Château de la Rochette which dominates the Rhone was the seat of the Lordship of Rochette, mentioned in 1407.

== Personalities ==
- Monseigneur Jacques-François Besson, born in Mieugy, Bishop of Metz from 1824 to 1842

== See also ==
- Communes of the Ain department
