= Béon =

Béon is the name of several places in France, including:

- Béon, Ain, a former commune in the department of Ain
- Béon, Yonne, commune in the department of Yonne
