= Chavornay =

Chavornay is the name of several places:

- Chavornay, Ain, a commune of the Ain département, in France
- Chavornay, Vaud, a municipality of the Vaud canton, in Switzerland
