= Culoz-Béon =

- Commune
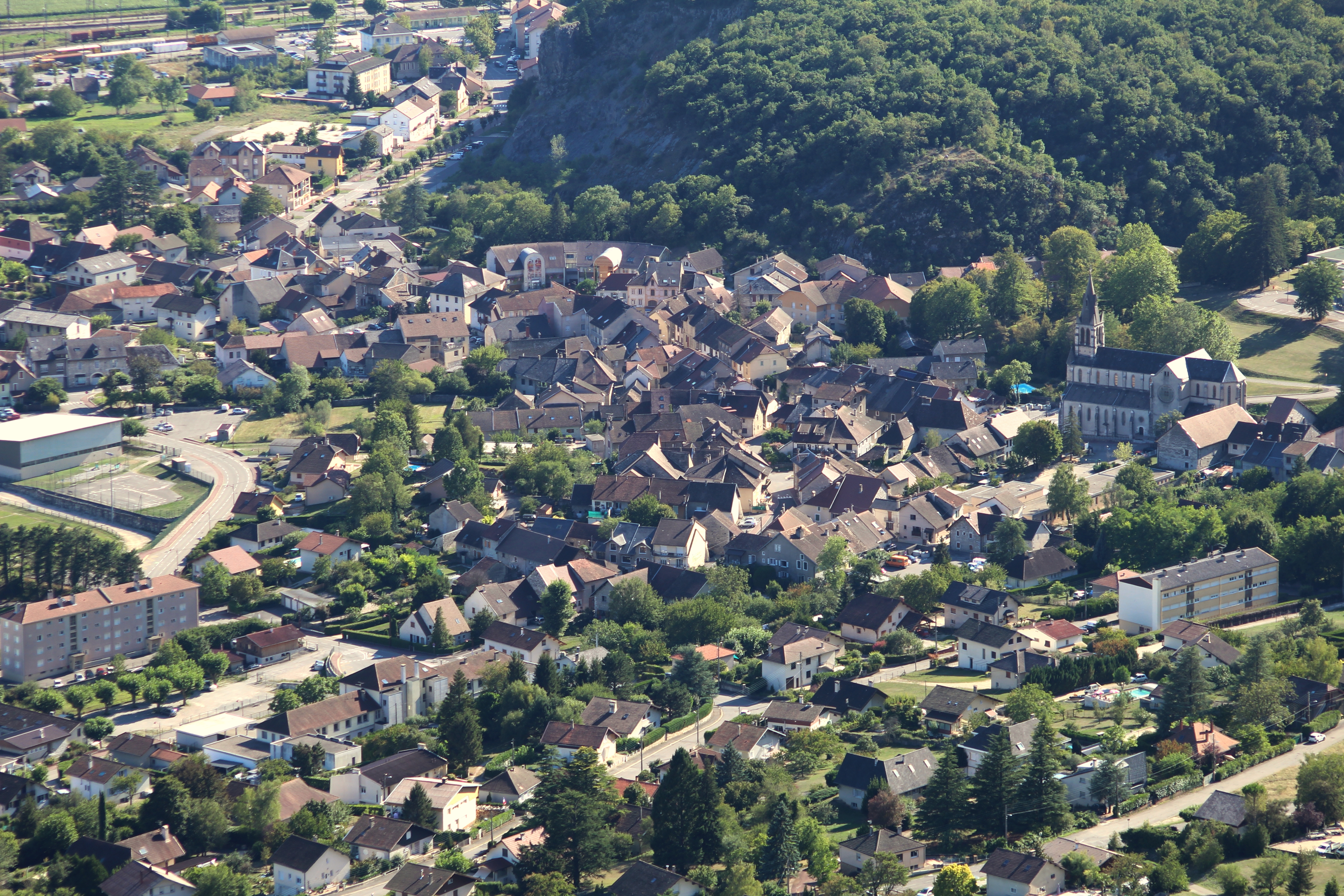
- View of the city-center of the former commune of Culoz from the Grand Colombier.
- Location of Culoz-Béon
- Location within France Location within Auvergne-Rhône-Alpes
- Coordinates: 45°51′00″N 5°46′59″E
- Country: France
- Region: Auvergne-Rhône-Alpes
- Department: Ain
- Arrondissement: Belley
- Canton: Plateau d'Hauteville
- Intercommunality: CC Bugey Sud

Government
  - Mayor (2026–32): Jean-Marc Dupont
- Area^{1}: 29.66 km^{2} (11.45 sq mi)
- Highest elevation: 1,430 m (4,690 ft)
- Lowest elevation: 226 m (741 ft)
- Population (2023): 3,453
  - Density: 116.4/km^{2} (301.5/sq mi)
- Time zone: UTC+01:00 (CET)
  - Summer (DST): UTC+02:00 (CEST)
- INSEE/Postal code: 01138 /01350
- ^{1} French Land Register data, which excludes lakes, ponds, glaciers > 1 km^{2} (0.386 sq mi or 247 acres) and river estuaries.

Culoz-Béon (French pronunciation: [kyloz beɔ̃]) is a commune nouvelle in the Ain department in the Auvergne-Rhône-Alpes region of France. It is the result of the merger, on 1 January 2023, of the former communes of Béon and Culoz.

== History ==
The commune nouvelle was officially created on 1 January 2023 from a prefectural decree of 12 December 2022 and with the transformation of the two former communes into "delegated communes".

== Population ==
Population data refer to the commune in its geography as of January 2025.

Historical population
Year	Pop.	±% p.a.
1968	2,710	—
1975	2,868	+0.81%
1982	2,976	+0.53%
1990	2,987	+0.05%
1999	2,986	−0.00%
2007	3,312	+1.30%
2012	3,369	+0.34%
2017	3,489	+0.70%
2023	3,453	−0.17%
Source: INSEE

== Politics and administration ==
=== Delegated communes ===
List of delegated communes of Culoz-Béon
Delegated commune	INSEE code	Intercommunality	Area (km^{2})	Population (2020)	Density (per km^{2})
Culoz (seat)	01138	CC Bugey Sud	19.36	2,987	154
Béon	01039	CC Bugey Sud	10.3	439	43

== See also ==
- Communes of the Ain department
