= Benoît Costaz =

Benoît, baron Costaz (27 February 1761, Champagne-en-Valromey - 13 March 1842, Paris) was a French bishop.

Entering holy orders before 1789, he refused to swear to the Civil Constitution of the Clergy and took refuge in Savoy, Switzerland then Turin. He was removed from the list of émigrés in 1800 and on his return to Paris and the Concordat of 1802 was made curé of the Église de la Madeleine, then bishop of Nancy on 22 October 1810, by imperial decree, holding the bishopric until the Bourbon Restoration in 1814.

Baron de l'Empire and chevalier de la Légion d'honneur, Monseigneur Costaz is buried at the Père Lachaise cemetery.

His brother was baron Louis Costaz.
