= Diane Rouxel =

French actress (born 1993)

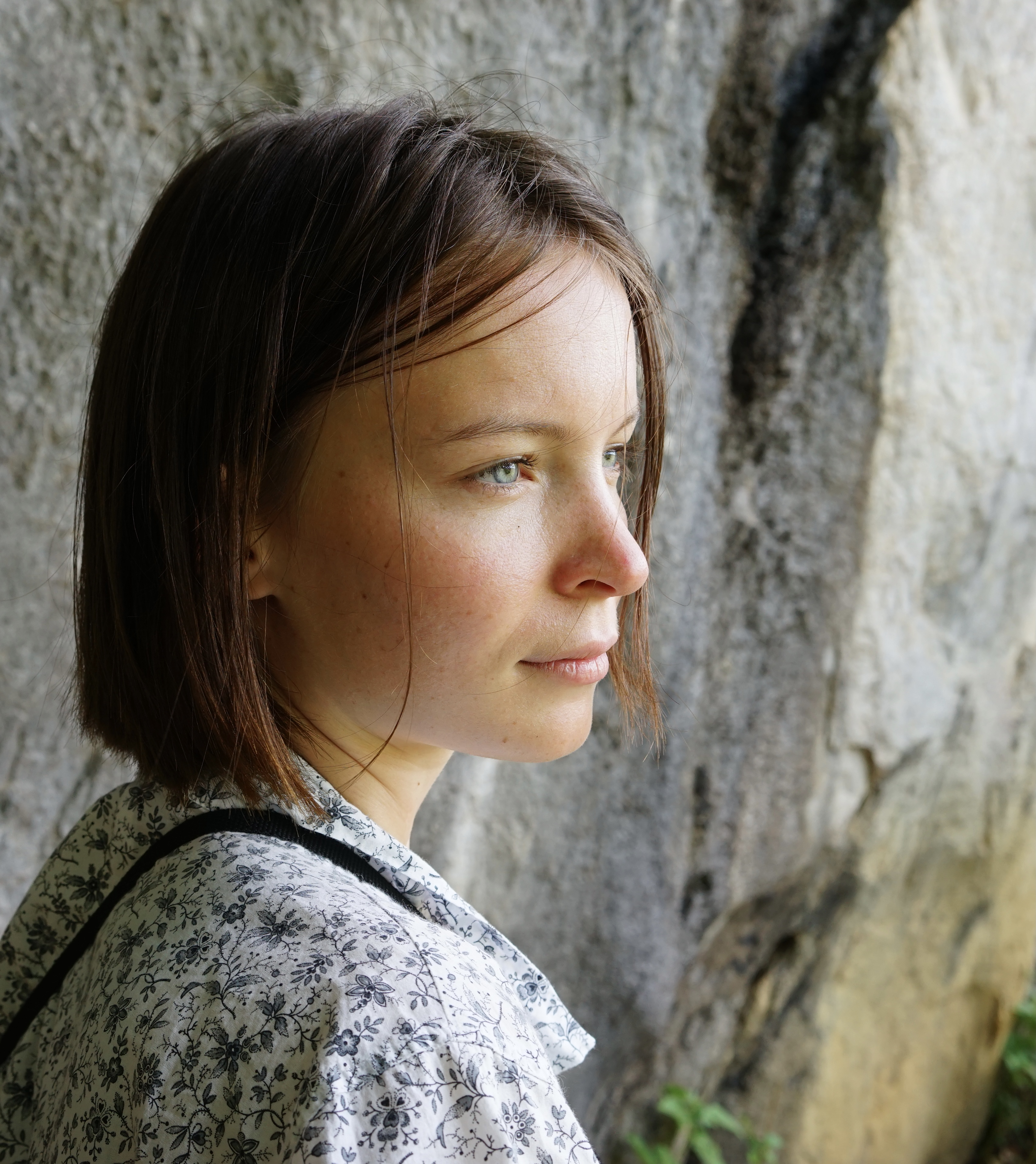
- Diane Rouxel
- Born: August 14, 1993 (age 32); Ambilly, Haute-Savoie, France
- Occupation: Actress
- Years active: 2014–present

Diane Rouxel (born August 14, 1993 in Ambilly) is a French actress. She was nominated for the César Award for Most Promising Actress in 2016 for her role in the film Standing Tall. She received the Prix Romy Schneider in 2019.

== Life and career ==
Diane Rouxel grew up in the Haute-Savoie region of France, and studied visual arts. Her first film role came in 2014's The Smell of Us, directed by Larry Clark, in which she plays a member of a group of skaters who, to pass the time, becomes involved with drink, drugs, and prostitution. In her next film, Standing Tall (2015), she plays Tess, the love interest of the film's protagonist, played by Rod Paradot. Rouxel was nominated for the César Award for Most Promising Actress for her role in the film. In 2019, Rouxel won the Prix Romy Schneider.

== Filmography ==
- The Smell of Us - 2014
- Standing Tall (La tête haute) - 2015
- Mad Love (Fou d'amour) - 2015
- The Mouth - 2015
- Moka - 2016
- The Wild Boys (Les garçons sauvages) - 2017
- Raising Colors (Volontaire) - 2018
- A Paris Education (Mes provinciales) - 2018
- Head Above Water (Marche ou crève) - 2018
- Beasts (La Terre des hommes) - 2020
- Evergreen$ (Sapin$) - 2023
