= Brénaz =

Part of Arvière-en-Valromey in Auvergne-Rhône-Alpes, France

- Part of Arvière-en-Valromey
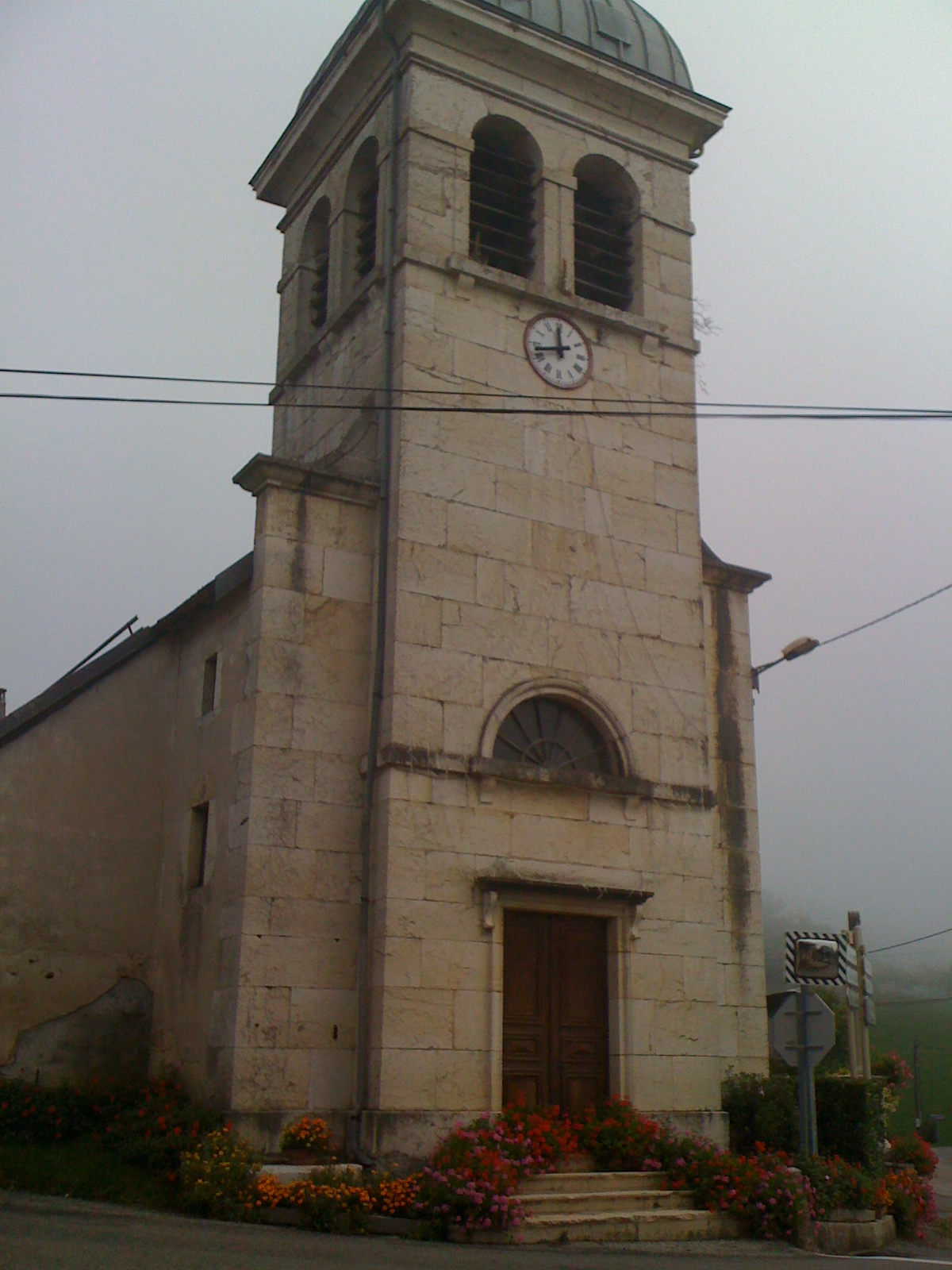
- Location of Brénaz
- Location within France Location within Auvergne-Rhône-Alpes
- Coordinates: 45°56′54″N 5°43′22″E
- Country: France
- Region: Auvergne-Rhône-Alpes
- Department: Ain
- Arrondissement: Belley
- Canton: Plateau d'Hauteville
- Commune: Arvière-en-Valromey
- Area^{1}: 9.79 km^{2} (3.78 sq mi)
- Elevation: 650 m (2,130 ft)
- Highest elevation: 1,425 m (4,675 ft)
- Lowest elevation: 580 m (1,900 ft)
- Population (2022): 101
  - Density: 10.3/km^{2} (26.7/sq mi)
- Time zone: UTC+01:00 (CET)
  - Summer (DST): UTC+02:00 (CEST)
- Postal code: 01260
- ^{1} French Land Register data, which excludes lakes, ponds, glaciers > 1 km^{2} (0.386 sq mi or 247 acres) and river estuaries.

Brénaz (French pronunciation: [bʁena]) is a former commune in the Ain department in eastern France. On 1 January 2019, it was merged into the new commune Arvière-en-Valromey.

== Geography ==
The commune lies west of the Grand Colombier (Ain).

== Population ==
Historical population
Year	Pop.	±% p.a.
2006	93	—
2011	92	−0.22%
2015	100	+2.11%
2022	101	+0.14%
Source: INSEE

== See also ==
- Communes of the Ain department
