= The Smell of Us =

2014 French drama film directed by Larry Clark

- Film poster
- Directed by: Larry Clark
- Written by: Mathieu Landais; Larry Clark
- Starring: Lukas Ionesco; Diane Rouxel
- Cinematography: Hélène Louvart
- Edited by: Marion Monnier
- Music by: Howard Paar
- Distributed by: Jour2Fête
- Release dates: 31 August 2014 (Venice Days); 14 January 2015 (France)
- Running time: 92 minutes
- Country: France
- Language: French
- Budget: €2.7 million
- Box office: $87,212

The Smell of Us is a 2014 French drama film directed by Larry Clark, focusing on the lives of several upper-class young people in Paris, skateboarding and having sex for pay. It was screened in the Venice Days section at the 71st Venice International Film Festival, and screened in France in 2015.

== Plot ==
Math, Marie, and JP are teenagers living in Paris. They used to hang out close to the Palais de Tokyo, a modern art museum. They spend their time skating, smoking pot, drinking, and filming each other the whole day. Developing extreme behaviours towards life, they do not hesitate to prostitute themselves just for fun and they keep taking drugs while having sex.

== Cast ==
- Lukas Ionesco as Math
- Diane Rouxel as Marie
- Théo Cholbi as Pacman
- Hugo Behar-Thinières as JP
- Ben Yaiche Ryan as Guillaume
- Adrien Binh Doan as Minh
- Terin Maxime as Toff
- Michael Pitt as a street musician
- Larry Clark as a drunk bum

== Reception ==
The Smell of Us was not widely reviewed, and was mostly received unfavorably, as a voyeuristic, inferior French rehash of Kids, with little story. In a 1-star review, The Guardian's Peter Bradshaw wrote, "This film is joyless, passionless, humourless, incurious about real people's real lives. There is no energy or verve, just the compulsive persistence of the porn addict." Jessica Kiang of IndieWire described it as "a film so horrible it manages to significantly outdo the repulsiveness of its title." Boyd Van Hoeij of The Hollywood Reporter characterized it as an "impressionistic and downright depressing tale of adolescent sexuality." Dillard Clayton of Slant called it "yet another entry in the filmmaker’s growingly tiresome oeuvre". Mark Adams of Screen acknowledged that its "characters are largely bland and one-dimensional", but more positively described the film as "provocative and challenging" and "littered with stylish and beautiful moments"

== Bibliography ==
Stéphane Delorme, "Mort à Paris" in : Les Cahiers du Cinéma, Janvier 2015 n°707
