= Howard Paar =

British music supervisor

Howard Paar is a British Grammy Award nominee music supervisor who has worked on over sixty films and television series, most notably Monster, Dogtown and Z-Boys (documentary film), Bully, and The L Word (television).

== Life and career ==
Paar first worked in Los Angeles as a club creator/DJ/promoter with such artists as The Specials, The Clash, The English Beat, The Go-Go's, The Psychedelic Furs, The Cure, The Bangles, Echo & The Bunnymen, and Lydia Lunch. Known for developing emergent new music scenes particularly ska and the Paisley Underground his club, The ON Klub, in collaboration with Sugarhill Records, was also the first locale to play a rap show in Los Angeles. He subsequently became an independent publicist representing clients including MTV, Ian Hunter, Mick Ronson, N.W.A, Bunny Wailer, Jimmy Cliff, Eric Burdon, Jimmy Jam & Terry Lewis, and Michelle Shocked while also booking a television show that featured Russell Simmons and Run-DMC.

He went on to become Vice President, Media & Artist Relations at Polygram Records working with a diverse range of artists including INXS, Def Leppard, Chuck D, Bon Jovi, Kiss, Vanessa Williams, Joan Osborne, James, The Robert Cray Band featuring the Memphis Horns and X before transitioning to the role of Vice President, Soundtracks at the same company. In this role, Paar worked on many soundtracks including The Coen Brothers’ The Big Lebowski and Gregg Araki’s Nowhere, as well as placing numerous songs in films and creating opportunities for Polygram artists to write themes for television shows including King of the Hill and Ellen.

Paar next joined Richard Branson’s V2 Records as Head of Film & TV where he worked closely with artists such as Moby until 1999 when he became an independent music supervisor. He continued to work with Moby whose album Play, became the first in history to have media placement for all tracks. In 2001, Paar was nominated for a Grammy Award for the soundtrack for the documentary Dogtown & Z Boys.

Paar continues to music supervise a wide range of critically acclaimed independent films including Monster, Bully, and Mysterious Skin as well as TV shows such as The L Word. His work with a diverse range of film makers including Larry Clark, Quentin Tarantino, and Mark Waters have helped to earn Paar a reputation for independent vision and authenticity to character, time, and place.

A member of the board for the Guild Of Music Supervisors, Paar values opportunities to elevate music and visual media.

== Novelist ==
His first novel, Once Upon A Time In LA, was a noir thriller about the music business, and was published in 2015.

== Filmography (as music supervisor unless otherwise noted) ==
- Can You Ever Forgive Me? (2018)
- Overboard (2018)
- Wonderwell (2018)
- Private Life (2018)
- Measure Of A Man (2018)
- Professor Marston and the Wonder Women (2017)
- Sun Dogs (2017)
- How To Be A Latin Lover (2017)
- The House Of Tomorrow (2017)
- Fun Mom Dinner (2017)
- Before I Fall (2017)
- 20th Century Women (2016)
- The Last Laugh (2016)
- Dance Camp (2016)
- Embers (2015)
- Kurt Cobain: Montage of Heck (2015)
- The Prophet (2015) - [music supervisor and soundtrack producer]
- The Diary of a Teenage Girl (2015) - [music supervisor & soundtrack producer]
- The Smell of Us (2014)
- Electric Slide (2014) - [music supervisor & soundtrack producer]
- Road to Paloma (2014)
- Date and Switch (2014)
- Vampire Academy (2014)- [music supervisor & soundtrack producer]
- The To Do List (2013) - [music supervisor & soundtrack producer]
- Rapture-Palooza (2013)
- Curse of the Sunset Starlet (2012)
- Would You Rather (2012)
- Girl in Progress (2012) - [music supervisor & soundtrack producer]
- Get the Gringo (2012) - [music supervisor & soundtrack producer]
- Girls Against Boys (2012)
- A Love Affair of Sorts (2011)
- Rebirth (2011)
- Choose (2010)
- London Boulevard (2010) - [music consultant]
- Lost Boys: The Thirst (2010)
- Ceremony (2010) - [music supervisor & soundtrack producer]
- Lifted (2010)
- Sympathy for Delicious (2010) - [music supervisor & soundtrack producer]
- The Blind Video (2009)
- While She Was Out (2008)
- The Ramen Girl (2008)
- August (2008)
- The Man Who Souled the World (2007) - [music supervisor & associate producer]
- What We Do Is Secret (2007) - [music supervisor & soundtrack producer]
- Daltry Calhoun (2005) - [music supervisor & executive soundtrack producer]
- Embedded (2005) - [music consultant]
- Sueño (2005) - [music supervisor & executive soundtrack producer]
- Herbie: Fully Loaded (2005) - [music supervisor & executive soundtrack producer ]
- What If? (2005)
- Round Three (2004)
- Mysterious Skin (2004)
- D.E.B.S. (2004) - [music supervisor & soundtrack producer]
- Monster (2003)
- Easy (2003)
- Party Monster (2003) - [music supervisor & executive soundtrack producer ]
- Kiss the Bride (2002)
- Garage Days (2002)
- Ken Park (2002)
- Opinion: To Each His Own (2001)
- Down and Out with the Dolls (2001) - [music supervisor & executive soundtrack producer]
- Bully (2001) - [music supervisor & executive soundtrack producer ]
- Southlander: Diary of a Desperate Musician (2001)
- Things Behind the Sun (2001)
- Dogtown and Z-Boys (2001) - [executive soundtrack producer]
- The Independent (2000)
- Psycho Beach Party (2000) - [music supervisor & executive soundtrack producer ]
- Splendor (1999) - [music supervisor & executive soundtrack producer]
- The Big Lebowski (1998) - [music coordination & executive soundtrack producer]
- Another Day in Paradise (1998) - [music supervisor & executive soundtrack producer ]
- Nowhere (1997) - [music supervisor & executive soundtrack producer ]
- Girls Town (1996) - [executive soundtrack producer]

== Television series (as music supervisor) ==
- Graves (10 episodes) (2016)
- Betrayal (7 episodes) (2013)
- Hung (2 episodes) (2010)
- The L Word (32 episodes) (2007-2009) - [music supervisor & soundtrack producer for three releases]
- Alias (2 episodes) (2003)
- Oliver Beene (2003)
- Miss Match (18 episodes) (2003)
- Greg the Bunny (13 episodes) (2002)
- Freaky Links (13 episodes) (2000-2001)
