= Arvière-en-Valromey =

Commune in Auvergne-Rhône-Alpes, France

- Commune
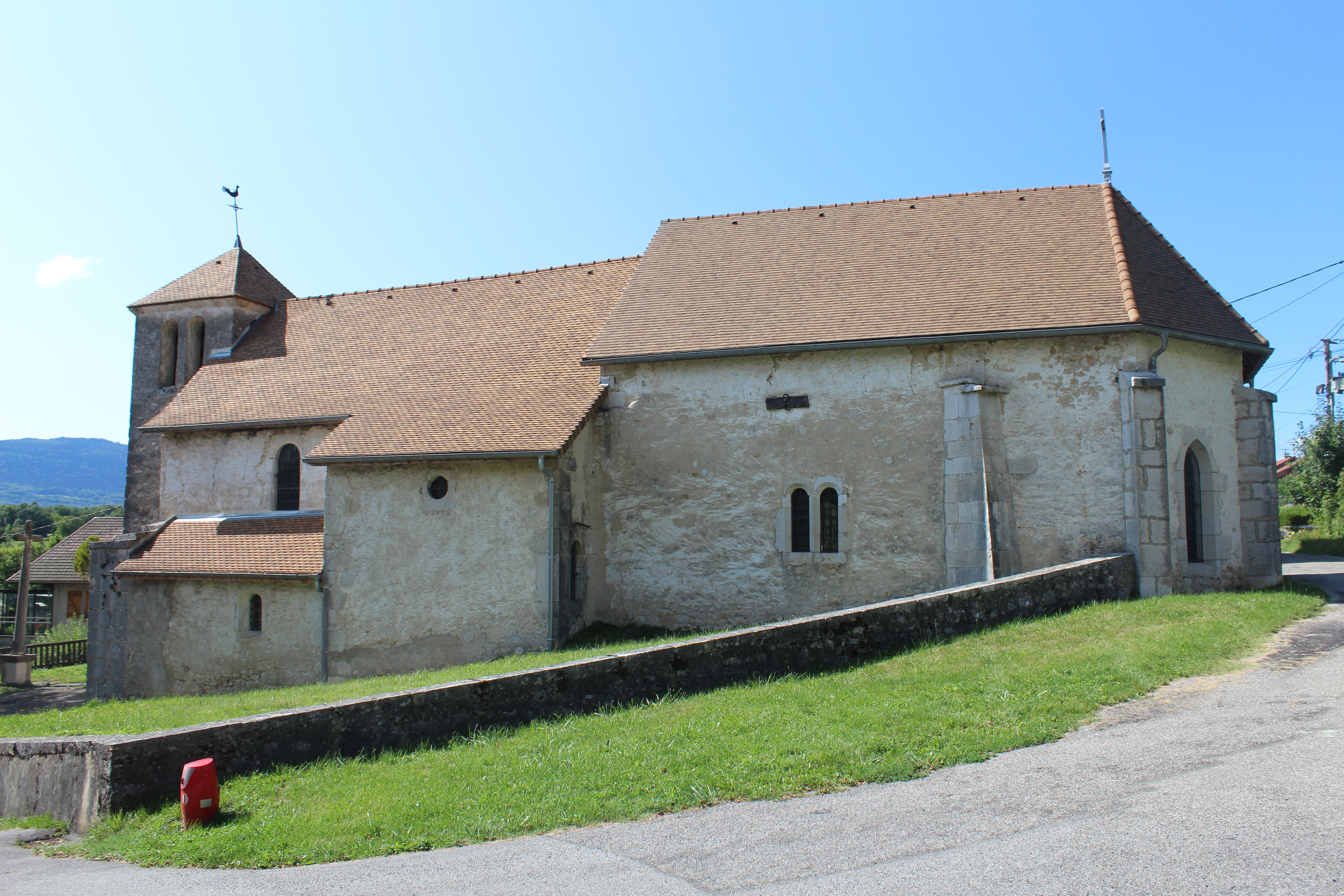
- St André's Church
- Location of Arvière-en-Valromey
- Location within France Location within Auvergne-Rhône-Alpes
- Coordinates: 45°54′30″N 5°43′32″E
- Country: France
- Region: Auvergne-Rhône-Alpes
- Department: Ain
- Arrondissement: Belley
- Canton: Plateau d'Hauteville
- Intercommunality: Bugey Sud

Government
  - Mayor (2026–32): Pascale Martinod
- Area^{1}: 37.18 km^{2} (14.36 sq mi)
- Highest elevation: 1,524 m (5,000 ft)
- Lowest elevation: 305 m (1,001 ft)
- Population (2023): 717
  - Density: 19.3/km^{2} (49.9/sq mi)
- Time zone: UTC+01:00 (CET)
  - Summer (DST): UTC+02:00 (CEST)
- INSEE/Postal code: 01453 /01260, 01510
- Website: https://arviere-en-valromey.fr/
- ^{1} French Land Register data, which excludes lakes, ponds, glaciers > 1 km^{2} (0.386 sq mi or 247 acres) and river estuaries.

Arvière-en-Valromey (French pronunciation: [aʁvjɛʁ ɑ̃ valʁɔmɛ]) is a commune in the Ain department in eastern France. The municipality was established on 1 January 2019 by merger of the former communes of Brénaz, Chavornay, Lochieu and Virieu-le-Petit.

== Geography ==
=== Climate ===
Arvière-en-Valromey has an oceanic climate (Köppen climate classification Cfb). The average annual temperature in Arvière-en-Valromey is 11.0 °C (51.8 °F). The average annual rainfall is 1,363.9 mm (53.70 in) with November as the wettest month. The temperatures are highest on average in July, at around 20.2 °C (68.4 °F), and lowest in January, at around 1.7 °C (35.1 °F). The highest temperature ever recorded in Arvière-en-Valromey was 37.6 °C (99.7 °F) on 13 August 2003; the coldest temperature ever recorded was −14.2 °C (6.4 °F) on 5 February 2012.

Climate data for Virieu-le-Petit, Arvière-en-Valromey (1981–2010 averages, extremes 1999−2018)
Month	Jan	Feb	Mar	Apr	May	Jun	Jul	Aug	Sep	Oct	Nov	Dec	Year
Record high °C (°F)	15.4 (59.7)	17.7 (63.9)	23.0 (73.4)	28.0 (82.4)	31.3 (88.3)	35.2 (95.4)	35.6 (96.1)	37.6 (99.7)	29.4 (84.9)	24.6 (76.3)	20.1 (68.2)	17.5 (63.5)	37.6 (99.7)
Mean daily maximum °C (°F)	4.9 (40.8)	6.9 (44.4)	11.4 (52.5)	15.8 (60.4)	20.0 (68.0)	24.2 (75.6)	25.8 (78.4)	24.8 (76.6)	20.7 (69.3)	15.9 (60.6)	9.1 (48.4)	5.2 (41.4)	15.4 (59.7)
Daily mean °C (°F)	1.7 (35.1)	3.0 (37.4)	6.8 (44.2)	10.6 (51.1)	14.9 (58.8)	18.6 (65.5)	20.2 (68.4)	19.5 (67.1)	15.8 (60.4)	11.8 (53.2)	5.9 (42.6)	2.2 (36.0)	11.0 (51.8)
Mean daily minimum °C (°F)	−1.4 (29.5)	−0.8 (30.6)	2.3 (36.1)	5.4 (41.7)	9.7 (49.5)	13.0 (55.4)	14.5 (58.1)	14.2 (57.6)	10.9 (51.6)	7.6 (45.7)	2.8 (37.0)	−0.8 (30.6)	6.5 (43.7)
Record low °C (°F)	−11.9 (10.6)	−14.2 (6.4)	−10.9 (12.4)	−4.5 (23.9)	1.4 (34.5)	3.2 (37.8)	7.2 (45.0)	7.7 (45.9)	2.2 (36.0)	−3.1 (26.4)	−7.2 (19.0)	−13.1 (8.4)	−14.2 (6.4)
Average precipitation mm (inches)	117.0 (4.61)	109.4 (4.31)	122.1 (4.81)	104.7 (4.12)	112.6 (4.43)	77.4 (3.05)	97.6 (3.84)	126.7 (4.99)	97.1 (3.82)	134.4 (5.29)	136.6 (5.38)	128.3 (5.05)	1,363.9 (53.70)
Average precipitation days (≥ 1.0 mm)	10.8	10.3	11.5	10.3	11.3	9.0	9.5	11.4	8.3	11.4	11.8	11.7	127.3
Source: Meteociel

== See also ==
- Communes of the Ain department
