= Valromey-sur-Séran =

Commune in Auvergne-Rhône-Alpes, France

- Commune
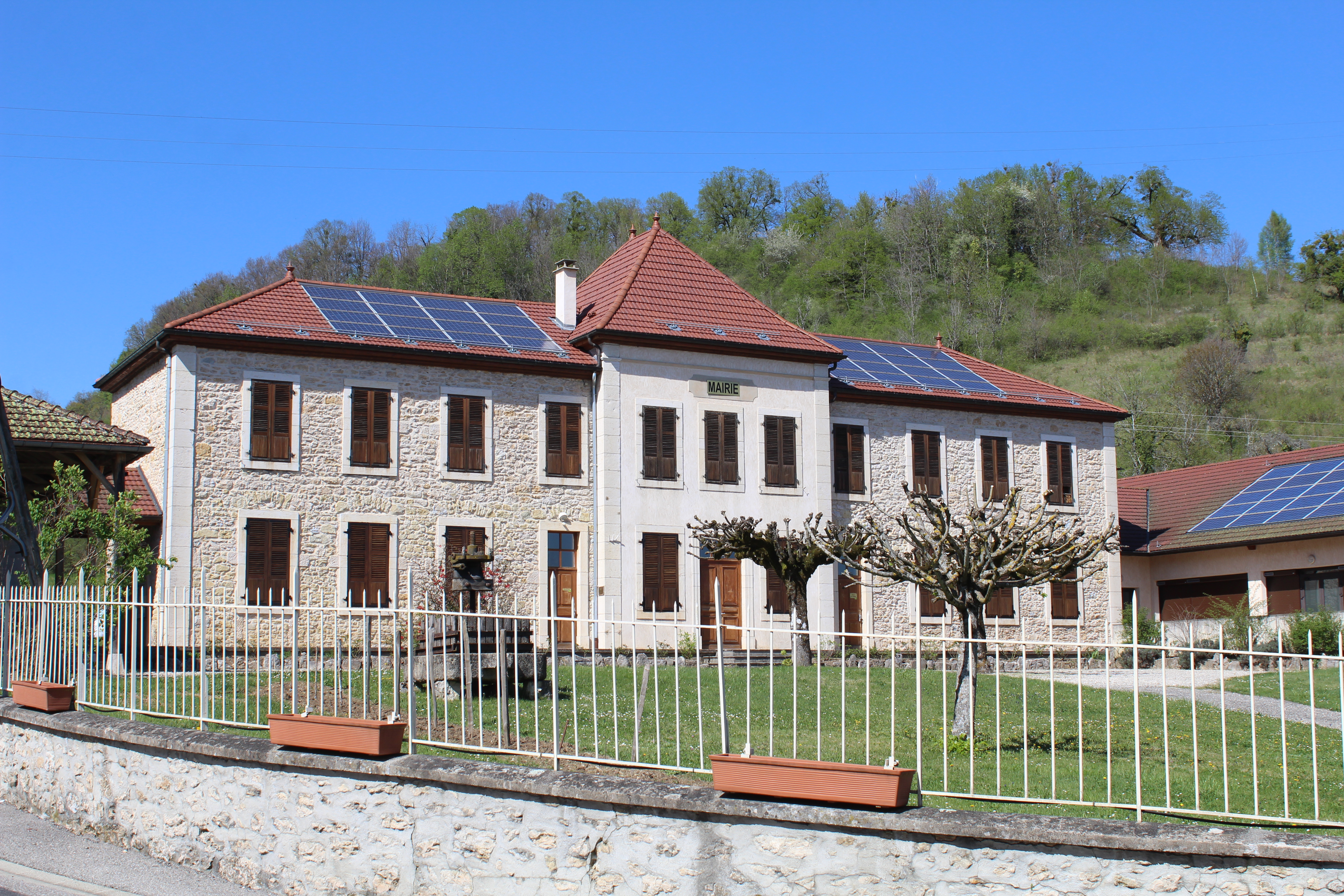
- Town hall
- Location of Valromey-sur-Séran
- Location within France Location within Auvergne-Rhône-Alpes
- Coordinates: 45°52′53″N 5°39′44″E
- Country: France
- Region: Auvergne-Rhône-Alpes
- Department: Ain
- Arrondissement: Belley
- Canton: Plateau d'Hauteville
- Intercommunality: Bugey Sud

Government
  - Mayor (2026–32): Pauline Godet
- Area^{1}: 56.71 km^{2} (21.90 sq mi)
- Highest elevation: 1,241 m (4,072 ft)
- Lowest elevation: 251 m (823 ft)
- Population (2023): 1,351
  - Density: 23.82/km^{2} (61.70/sq mi)
- Time zone: UTC+01:00 (CET)
  - Summer (DST): UTC+02:00 (CEST)
- INSEE/Postal code: 01036 /01260
- ^{1} French Land Register data, which excludes lakes, ponds, glaciers > 1 km^{2} (0.386 sq mi or 247 acres) and river estuaries.

Valromey-sur-Séran (French pronunciation: [valʁɔmɛ syʁ seʁɑ̃]) is a commune in the Ain department in eastern France. The municipality was established on 1 January 2019 by merger of the former communes of Belmont-Luthézieu, Lompnieu, Sutrieu and Vieu.

== Geography ==
=== Climate ===
Valromey-sur-Séran has an oceanic climate (Köppen climate classification Cfb). The average annual temperature in Valromey-sur-Séran is 9.3 °C (48.7 °F). The average annual rainfall is 1,413.2 mm (55.64 in) with December as the wettest month. The temperatures are highest on average in July, at around 18.3 °C (64.9 °F), and lowest in January, at around 0.8 °C (33.4 °F). The highest temperature ever recorded in Valromey-sur-Séran was 37.7 °C (99.9 °F) on 31 July 2022; the coldest temperature ever recorded was −24.1 °C (−11.4 °F) on 7 February 2020.

Climate data for Sutrieu, Valromey-sur-Séran (1991−2020 normals, extremes 2002−present)
Month	Jan	Feb	Mar	Apr	May	Jun	Jul	Aug	Sep	Oct	Nov	Dec	Year
Record high °C (°F)	18.4 (65.1)	17.4 (63.3)	20.9 (69.6)	24.8 (76.6)	29.7 (85.5)	33.9 (93.0)	35.6 (96.1)	36.4 (97.5)	29.3 (84.7)	24.0 (75.2)	20.2 (68.4)	17.9 (64.2)	36.4 (97.5)
Mean daily maximum °C (°F)	4.2 (39.6)	4.8 (40.6)	9.2 (48.6)	13.9 (57.0)	17.2 (63.0)	22.0 (71.6)	24.5 (76.1)	23.5 (74.3)	19.4 (66.9)	14.4 (57.9)	8.7 (47.7)	5.2 (41.4)	13.9 (57.0)
Daily mean °C (°F)	0.8 (33.4)	1.1 (34.0)	4.8 (40.6)	8.7 (47.7)	12.0 (53.6)	16.3 (61.3)	18.3 (64.9)	17.7 (63.9)	14.3 (57.7)	10.2 (50.4)	5.2 (41.4)	1.8 (35.2)	9.3 (48.7)
Mean daily minimum °C (°F)	−2.5 (27.5)	−2.7 (27.1)	0.3 (32.5)	3.5 (38.3)	6.7 (44.1)	10.6 (51.1)	12.1 (53.8)	11.9 (53.4)	9.2 (48.6)	6.1 (43.0)	1.6 (34.9)	−1.5 (29.3)	4.6 (40.3)
Record low °C (°F)	−17.0 (1.4)	−17.4 (0.7)	−17.4 (0.7)	−8.8 (16.2)	−1.8 (28.8)	−0.6 (30.9)	4.0 (39.2)	3.4 (38.1)	−0.6 (30.9)	−6.2 (20.8)	−10.7 (12.7)	−17.7 (0.1)	−17.7 (0.1)
Average precipitation mm (inches)	147.1 (5.79)	104.1 (4.10)	117.1 (4.61)	97.8 (3.85)	119.8 (4.72)	102.1 (4.02)	89.9 (3.54)	94.5 (3.72)	79.2 (3.12)	141.4 (5.57)	156.8 (6.17)	163.4 (6.43)	1,413.2 (55.64)
Average precipitation days (≥ 1.0 mm)	13.1	10.1	11.4	9.8	12.4	10.2	8.8	8.9	8.1	10.9	11.6	12.6	128.0
Source: Météo-France

Climate data for Vieu, Valromey-sur-Séran (1991−2020 normals, extremes 1990−2020)
Month	Jan	Feb	Mar	Apr	May	Jun	Jul	Aug	Sep	Oct	Nov	Dec	Year
Record high °C (°F)	19.1 (66.4)	20.5 (68.9)	23.1 (73.6)	26.9 (80.4)	30.8 (87.4)	36.0 (96.8)	37.7 (99.9)	37.0 (98.6)	32.0 (89.6)	26.6 (79.9)	22.7 (72.9)	17.2 (63.0)	37.7 (99.9)
Mean daily maximum °C (°F)	5.5 (41.9)	6.7 (44.1)	10.9 (51.6)	14.5 (58.1)	18.5 (65.3)	22.4 (72.3)	24.7 (76.5)	24.6 (76.3)	20.0 (68.0)	15.5 (59.9)	9.6 (49.3)	6.3 (43.3)	14.9 (58.8)
Daily mean °C (°F)	1.4 (34.5)	1.8 (35.2)	5.2 (41.4)	8.3 (46.9)	12.3 (54.1)	16.0 (60.8)	18.1 (64.6)	17.9 (64.2)	14.0 (57.2)	10.4 (50.7)	5.3 (41.5)	2.2 (36.0)	9.4 (48.9)
Mean daily minimum °C (°F)	−2.8 (27.0)	−3.0 (26.6)	−0.5 (31.1)	2.1 (35.8)	6.2 (43.2)	9.5 (49.1)	11.4 (52.5)	11.2 (52.2)	8.0 (46.4)	5.4 (41.7)	1.0 (33.8)	−1.8 (28.8)	3.9 (39.0)
Record low °C (°F)	−22.5 (−8.5)	−24.1 (−11.4)	−22.5 (−8.5)	−9.4 (15.1)	−5.3 (22.5)	−1.5 (29.3)	2.0 (35.6)	−0.2 (31.6)	−3.0 (26.6)	−8.6 (16.5)	−15.0 (5.0)	−22.4 (−8.3)	−24.1 (−11.4)
Average precipitation mm (inches)	142.7 (5.62)	121.6 (4.79)	124.7 (4.91)	126.3 (4.97)	138.2 (5.44)	114.6 (4.51)	124.0 (4.88)	106.1 (4.18)	127.4 (5.02)	152.9 (6.02)	165.4 (6.51)	166.4 (6.55)	1,610.3 (63.40)
Average precipitation days (≥ 1.0 mm)	12.5	11.8	11.7	11.4	13.0	10.6	9.8	9.7	9.8	12.4	12.9	14.3	139.8
Source: Météo-France

== See also ==
- Communes of the Ain department
