= Lompnieu =

Part of Valromey-sur-Séran in Auvergne-Rhône-Alpes, France

- Part of Valromey-sur-Séran
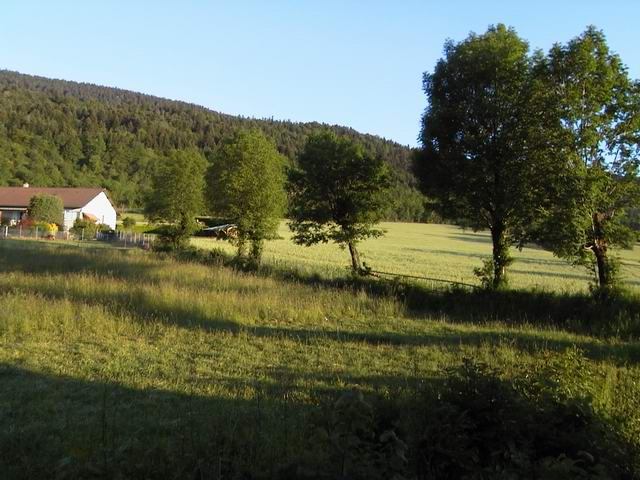
- Location of Lompnieu
- Location within France Location within Auvergne-Rhône-Alpes
- Coordinates: 45°57′42″N 5°39′39″E
- Country: France
- Region: Auvergne-Rhône-Alpes
- Department: Ain
- Arrondissement: Belley
- Canton: Plateau d'Hauteville
- Commune: Valromey-sur-Séran
- Area^{1}: 11.35 km^{2} (4.38 sq mi)
- Elevation: 650 m (2,130 ft)
- Highest elevation: 1,241 m (4,072 ft)
- Lowest elevation: 524 m (1,719 ft)
- Population (2022): 135
  - Density: 11.9/km^{2} (30.8/sq mi)
- Time zone: UTC+01:00 (CET)
  - Summer (DST): UTC+02:00 (CEST)
- Postal code: 01260
- ^{1} French Land Register data, which excludes lakes, ponds, glaciers > 1 km^{2} (0.386 sq mi or 247 acres) and river estuaries.

Lompnieu is a former commune in the Ain department in eastern France. On 1 January 2019, it was merged into the new commune Valromey-sur-Séran.

It is located in La Val Romey, which means, "The Roman Valley." The Romans built several outposts in the valley.

Lompnieu is located near the base of the large valley, with forest mounting on one side, and a plain with larger mountains looming on the other side. On a clear day, the snow-covered Alps can be seen. Lompnieu is around 600 metres in elevation. The climate is rather hot in the summer, attaining into the 1990s, and fairly cold in winter, with several large snow falls.

== Population ==
Historical population
Year	Pop.	±% p.a.
2006	96	—
2011	125	+5.42%
2015	113	−2.49%
2022	135	+2.57%
Source: INSEE

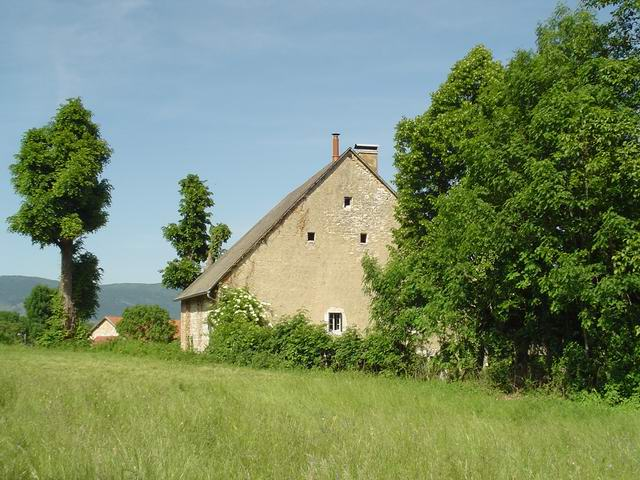

== See also ==
- Communes of the Ain department
