= Sutrieu =

Part of Valromey-sur-Séran in Auvergne-Rhône-Alpes, France

- Part of Valromey-sur-Séran
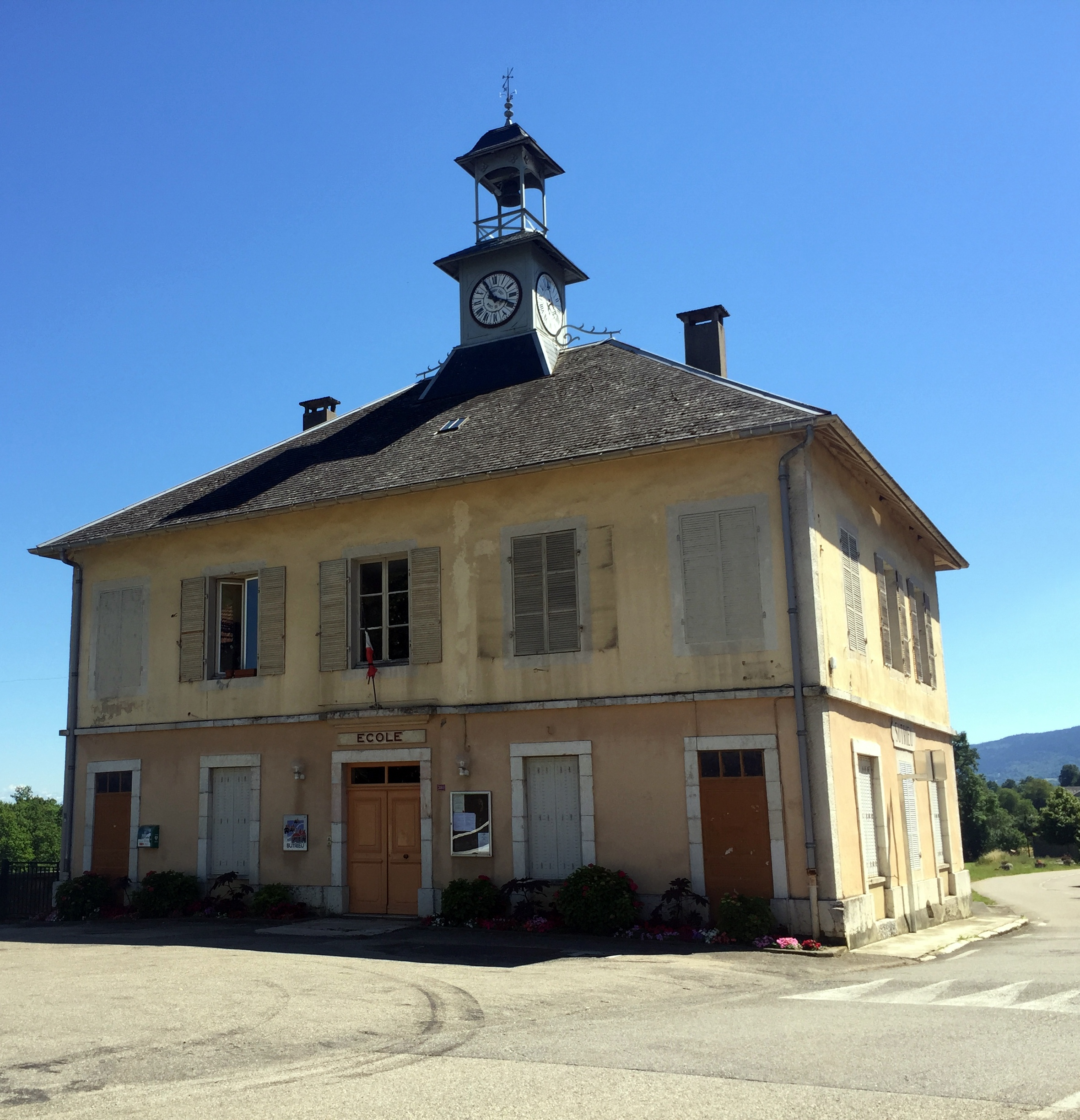
- Location of Sutrieu
- Location within France Location within Auvergne-Rhône-Alpes
- Coordinates: 45°57′05″N 5°39′32″E
- Country: France
- Region: Auvergne-Rhône-Alpes
- Department: Ain
- Arrondissement: Belley
- Canton: Plateau d'Hauteville
- Commune: Valromey-sur-Séran
- Area^{1}: 20 km^{2} (7.7 sq mi)
- Elevation: 650 m (2,130 ft)
- Highest elevation: 1,200 m (3,900 ft)
- Lowest elevation: 459 m (1,506 ft)
- Population (2022): 223
  - Density: 11/km^{2} (29/sq mi)
- Time zone: UTC+01:00 (CET)
  - Summer (DST): UTC+02:00 (CEST)
- Postal code: 01260
- ^{1} French Land Register data, which excludes lakes, ponds, glaciers > 1 km^{2} (0.386 sq mi or 247 acres) and river estuaries.

Sutrieu (French pronunciation: [sytʁijø]) is a former commune in the Ain department in eastern France. On 1 January 2019, it was merged into the new commune Valromey-sur-Séran.

== Population ==
Historical population
Year	Pop.	±% p.a.
2006	217	—
2011	241	+2.12%
2015	211	−3.27%
2022	223	+0.79%
Source: INSEE

== See also ==
- Communes of the Ain department
