= Lochieu =

Part of Arvière-en-Valromey in Auvergne-Rhône-Alpes, France

- Part of Arvière-en-Valromey
- Location of Lochieu
- Location within France Location within Auvergne-Rhône-Alpes
- Coordinates: 45°55′50″N 5°43′40″E
- Country: France
- Region: Auvergne-Rhône-Alpes
- Department: Ain
- Arrondissement: Belley
- Canton: Plateau d'Hauteville
- Commune: Arvière-en-Valromey
- Area^{1}: 7.07 km^{2} (2.73 sq mi)
- Elevation: 600 m (2,000 ft)
- Highest elevation: 1,426 m (4,678 ft)
- Lowest elevation: 479 m (1,572 ft)
- Population (2022): 82
  - Density: 12/km^{2} (30/sq mi)
- Time zone: UTC+01:00 (CET)
  - Summer (DST): UTC+02:00 (CEST)
- Postal code: 01260
- ^{1} French Land Register data, which excludes lakes, ponds, glaciers > 1 km^{2} (0.386 sq mi or 247 acres) and river estuaries.

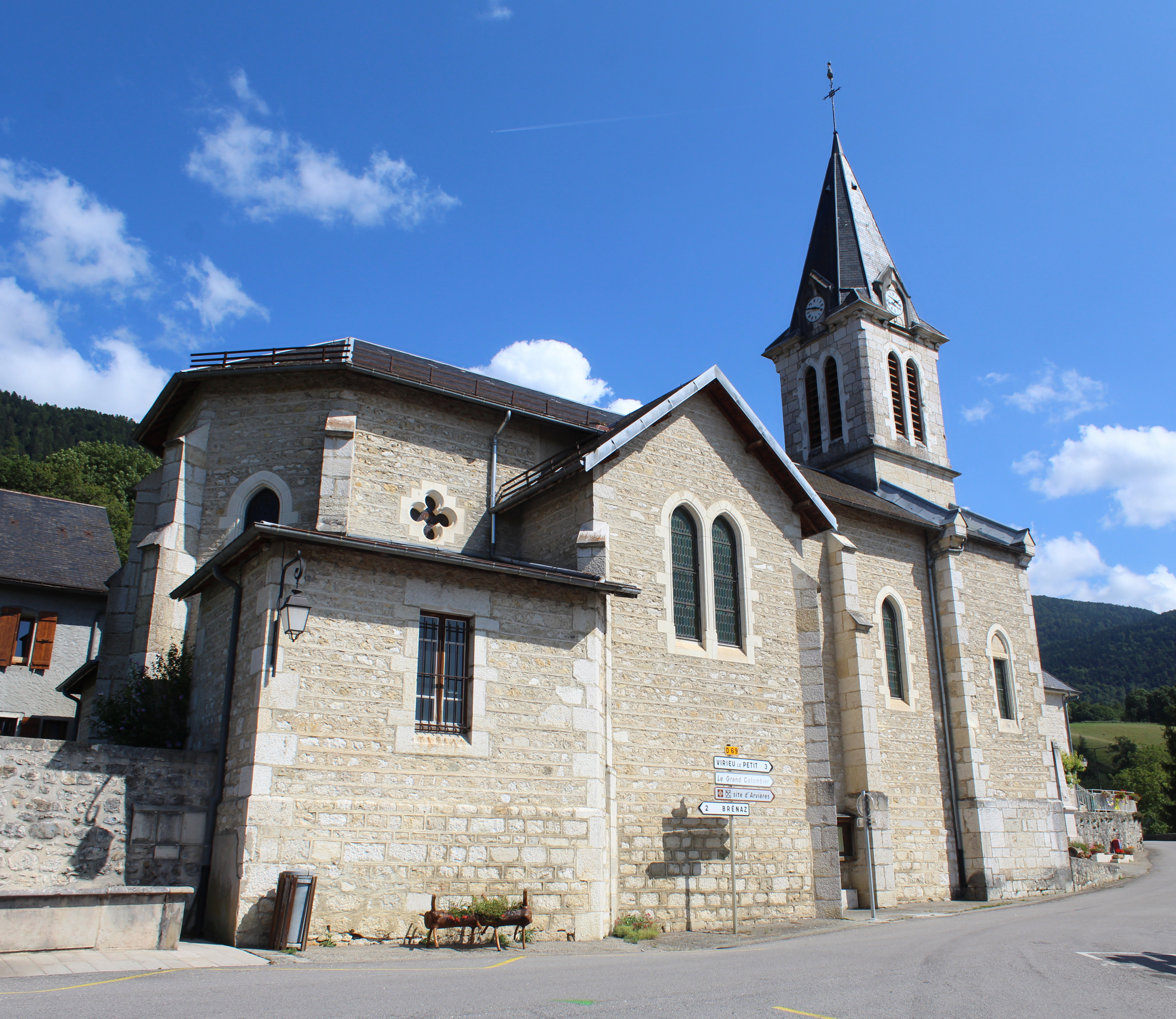
Église Assomption Lochieu 9.

Lochieu (French pronunciation: [lɔʃjø]) is a former commune in the Ain department in eastern France. On 1 January 2019, it was merged into the new commune Arvière-en-Valromey.

== Population ==
Historical population
Year	Pop.	±% p.a.
2006	86	—
2011	93	+1.58%
2015	93	+0.00%
2022	82	−1.78%
Source: INSEE

== See also ==
- Communes of the Ain department
