= Chavornay, Ain =

Part of Arvière-en-Valromey in Auvergne-Rhône-Alpes, France

Chavornay
- Part of Arvière-en-Valromey
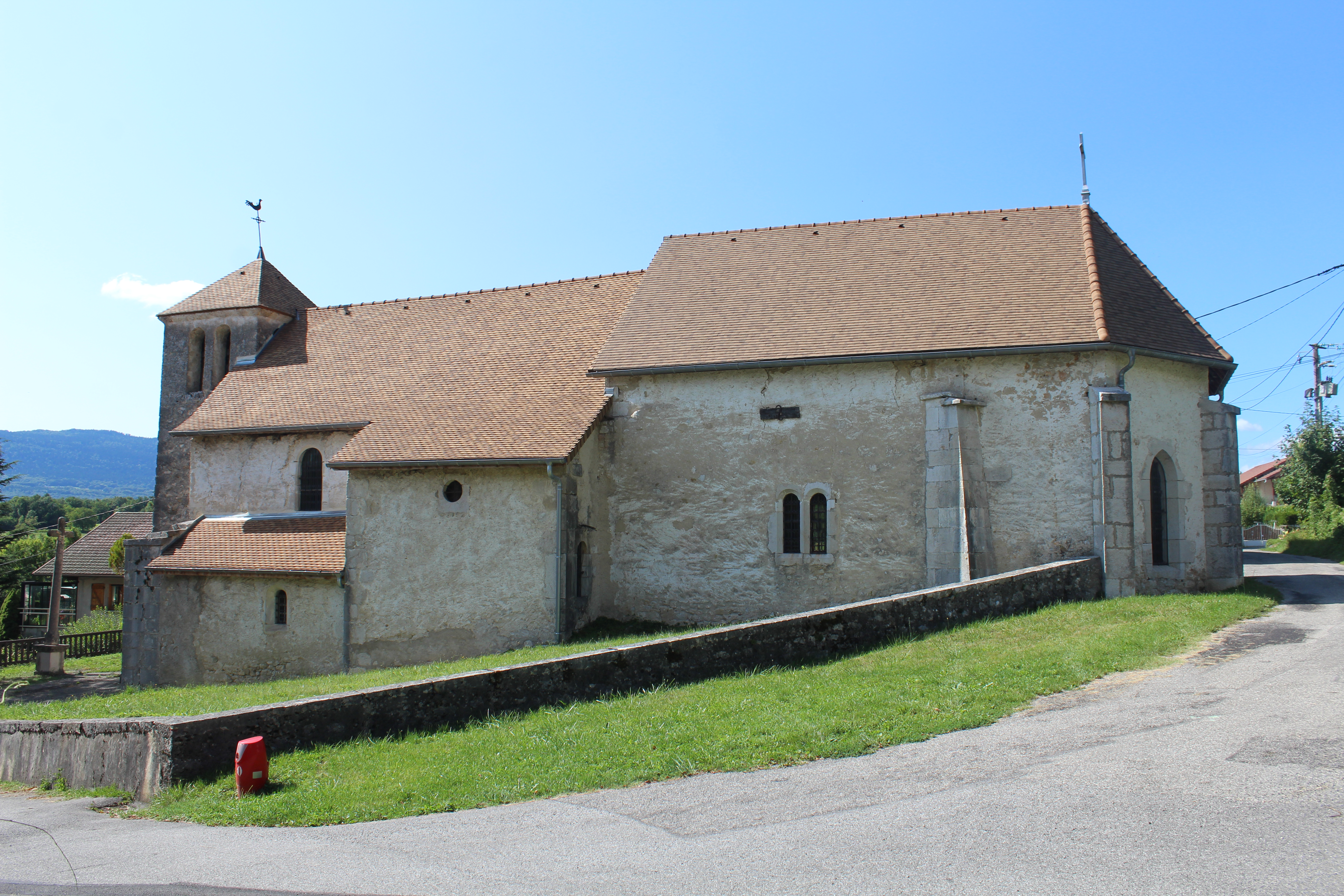
- Église St André
- Location of Chavornay
- Location within France Location within Auvergne-Rhône-Alpes
- Coordinates: 45°52′45″N 5°43′11″E
- Country: France
- Region: Auvergne-Rhône-Alpes
- Department: Ain
- Arrondissement: Belley
- Canton: Plateau d'Hauteville
- Commune: Arvière-en-Valromey
- Area^{1}: 7.77 km^{2} (3.00 sq mi)
- Elevation: 430 m (1,410 ft)
- Highest elevation: 1,440 m (4,720 ft)
- Lowest elevation: 305 m (1,001 ft)
- Population (2022): 200
  - Density: 26/km^{2} (67/sq mi)
- Time zone: UTC+01:00 (CET)
  - Summer (DST): UTC+02:00 (CEST)
- Postal code: 01510
- ^{1} French Land Register data, which excludes lakes, ponds, glaciers > 1 km^{2} (0.386 sq mi or 247 acres) and river estuaries.

Chavornay (French pronunciation: [ʃavɔʁnɛ]) is a former commune in the Ain department in eastern France. On 1 January 2019, it was merged into the new commune Arvière-en-Valromey.

== Population ==
Historical population
Year	Pop.	±% p.a.
2006	176	—
2011	209	+3.50%
2015	220	+1.29%
2022	200	−1.35%
Source: INSEE

== See also ==
- Communes of the Ain department
