= Vieu =

Part of Valromey-sur-Séran in Auvergne-Rhône-Alpes, France

Vieu Viu (Arpitan)
- Part of Valromey-sur-Séran
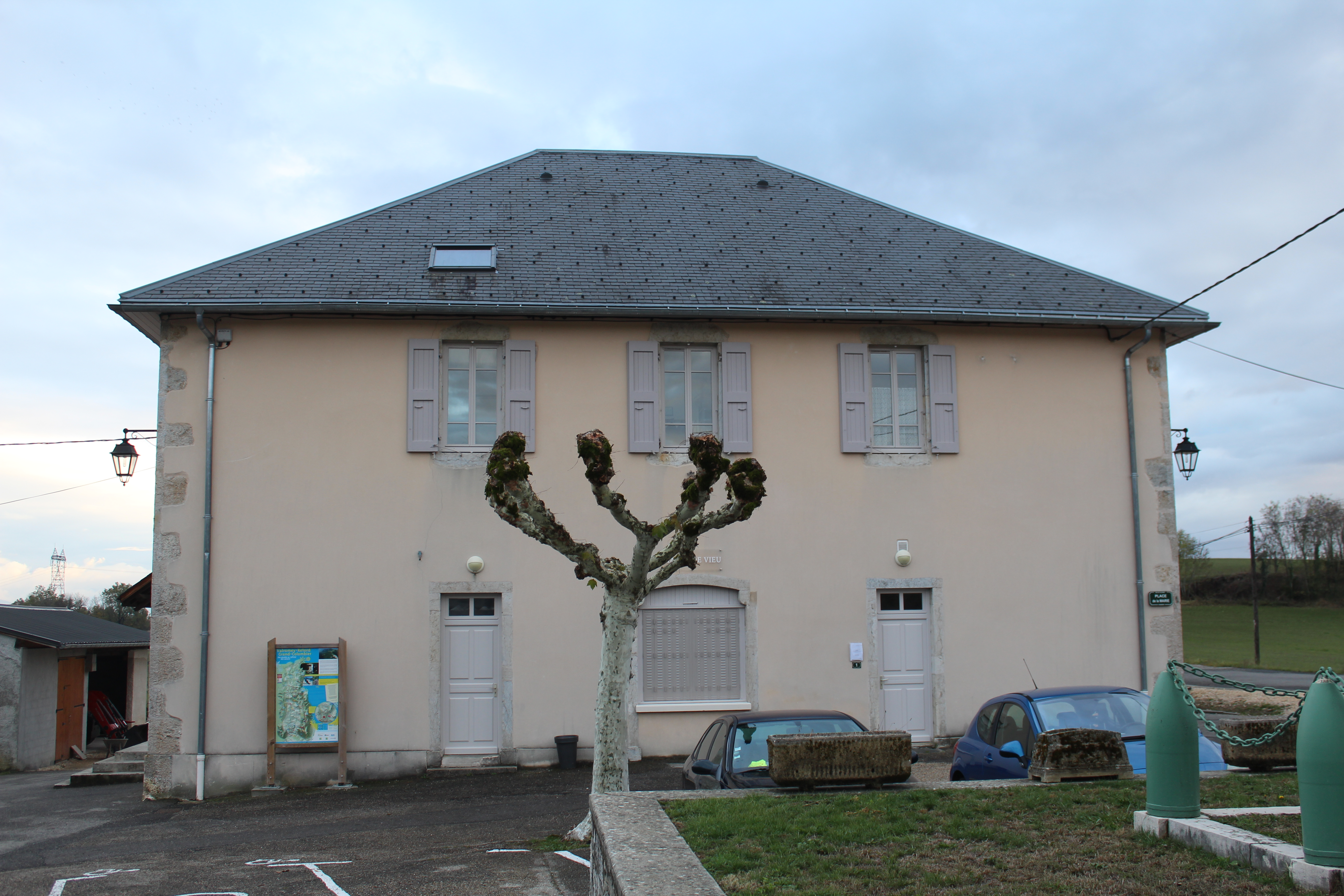
- Location of Vieu
- Location within France Location within Auvergne-Rhône-Alpes
- Coordinates: 45°54′00″N 5°41′00″E
- Country: France
- Region: Auvergne-Rhône-Alpes
- Department: Ain
- Arrondissement: Town hall
- Canton: Plateau d'Hauteville
- Commune: Valromey-sur-Séran
- Area^{1}: 6.54 km^{2} (2.53 sq mi)
- Elevation: 420 m (1,380 ft)
- Highest elevation: 540 m (1,770 ft)
- Lowest elevation: 280 m (920 ft)
- Population (2022): 381
  - Density: 58.3/km^{2} (151/sq mi)
- Time zone: UTC+01:00 (CET)
  - Summer (DST): UTC+02:00 (CEST)
- Postal code: 01260
- ^{1} French Land Register data, which excludes lakes, ponds, glaciers > 1 km^{2} (0.386 sq mi or 247 acres) and river estuaries.

Vieu (French pronunciation: [vjø]; Arpitan: Viu) is a former commune in the Ain department in eastern France. On 1 January 2019, it was merged into the new commune Valromey-sur-Séran.

== Population ==
Historical population
Year	Pop.	±% p.a.
2006	366	—
2011	380	+0.75%
2015	379	−0.07%
2022	381	+0.08%
Source: INSEE

== See also ==
- Communes of the Ain department
