= Béon, Ain =

Commune in Auvergne-Rhône-Alpes, France

Béon
- Part of Culoz-Béon
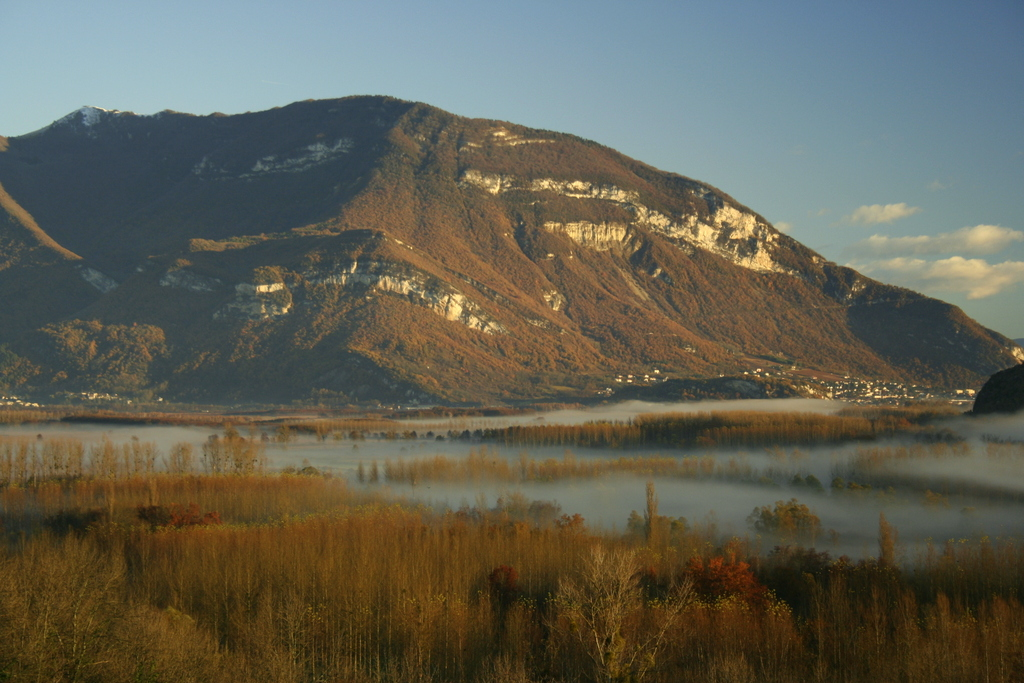
- Grand Colombier and the Lavours wetlands
- Location of Béon
- Location within France Location within Auvergne-Rhône-Alpes
- Coordinates: 45°50′00″N 5°45′00″E
- Country: France
- Region: Auvergne-Rhône-Alpes
- Department: Ain
- Arrondissement: Belley
- Canton: Plateau d'Hauteville
- Commune: Culoz-Béon
- Area^{1}: 10.30 km^{2} (3.98 sq mi)
- Elevation: 235 m (771 ft)
- Highest elevation: 1,412 m (4,633 ft)
- Lowest elevation: 228 m (748 ft)
- Population (2022): 426
  - Density: 41.4/km^{2} (107/sq mi)
- Time zone: UTC+01:00 (CET)
  - Summer (DST): UTC+02:00 (CEST)
- Postal code: 01350
- ^{1} French Land Register data, which excludes lakes, ponds, glaciers > 1 km^{2} (0.386 sq mi or 247 acres) and river estuaries.

Béon (French pronunciation: [beɔ̃]) is a former commune in the Ain department in eastern France. On 1 January 2023, it was merged into the new commune of Culoz-Béon.

== Population ==
Historical population
Year	Pop.	±% p.a.
1968	298	—
1975	345	+2.11%
1982	346	+0.04%
1990	348	+0.07%
1999	364	+0.50%
2007	355	−0.31%
2012	429	+3.86%
2017	454	+1.14%
Source: INSEE

== See also ==
- Communes of the Ain department
