= Culoz =

Commune in Auvergne-Rhône-Alpes, France

- Part of Culoz-Béon
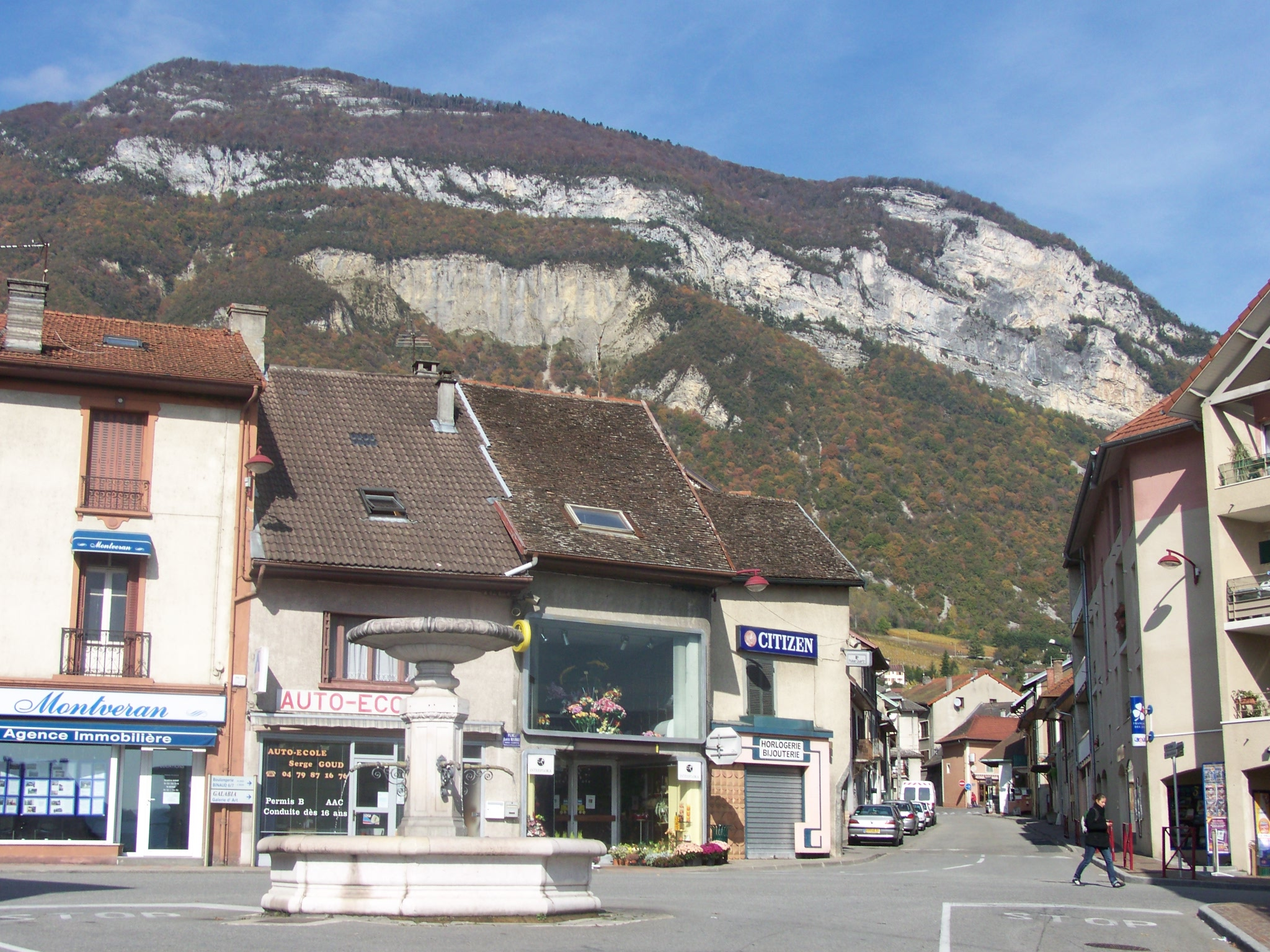

- Coat of arms
- Location of Culoz
- Location within France Location within Auvergne-Rhône-Alpes
- Coordinates: 45°51′N 5°47′E
- Country: France
- Region: Auvergne-Rhône-Alpes
- Department: Ain
- Arrondissement: Belley
- Canton: Plateau d'Hauteville
- Commune: Culoz-Béon
- Area^{1}: 19.36 km^{2} (7.47 sq mi)
- Elevation: 237 m (778 ft)
- Highest elevation: 1,430 m (4,690 ft)
- Lowest elevation: 226 m (741 ft)
- Population (2022): 2,990
  - Density: 154/km^{2} (400/sq mi)
- Time zone: UTC+01:00 (CET)
  - Summer (DST): UTC+02:00 (CEST)
- Postal code: 01350
- ^{1} French Land Register data, which excludes lakes, ponds, glaciers > 1 km^{2} (0.386 sq mi or 247 acres) and river estuaries.

Culoz (French pronunciation: [kylo] or [kyloz]) is a former commune in the Ain department in the Auvergne-Rhône-Alpes region of France. On 1 January 2023, it was merged into the new commune of Culoz-Béon.

== Geography ==
The town, which is situated on the right bank of the River Rhône just a few kilometres from the first foothills of the Alps, is dominated by the Grand Colombier: the highest summit of the southern end of the Jura Mountains.

Culoz lies on the D 904 road close to the point at which it crosses the D 992 and is also an important railway junction: Culoz railway station is served by lines to Geneva, Bellegarde-sur-Valserine, Évian-les-Bains, Aix-les-Bains, Bourg-Saint-Maurice, Lyon, and Paris.

== Personalities ==
- Henry Dunant, Nobel Peace Prize winner, 1901, was one of the founders of the Red Cross
- The surgeon Antonin Poncet, who died in Culoz in 1951
- Brothers Henry and Léon Serpollet, steam engineers
- Christophe Lemaitre, sprinter, European champion.

== Population ==
Historical population
| Year | Pop. | ±% p.a. |
|---|---|---|
| 1968 | 2,412 | — |
| 1975 | 2,523 | +0.64% |
| 1982 | 2,630 | +0.60% |
| 1990 | 2,639 | +0.04% |
| 1999 | 2,622 | −0.07% |
| 2007 | 2,957 | +1.51% |
| 2012 | 2,940 | −0.12% |
| 2017 | 3,035 | +0.64% |
Source: INSEE

== See also ==
- Communes of the Ain department
