= Talissieu =

Commune in Auvergne-Rhône-Alpes, France

- Commune
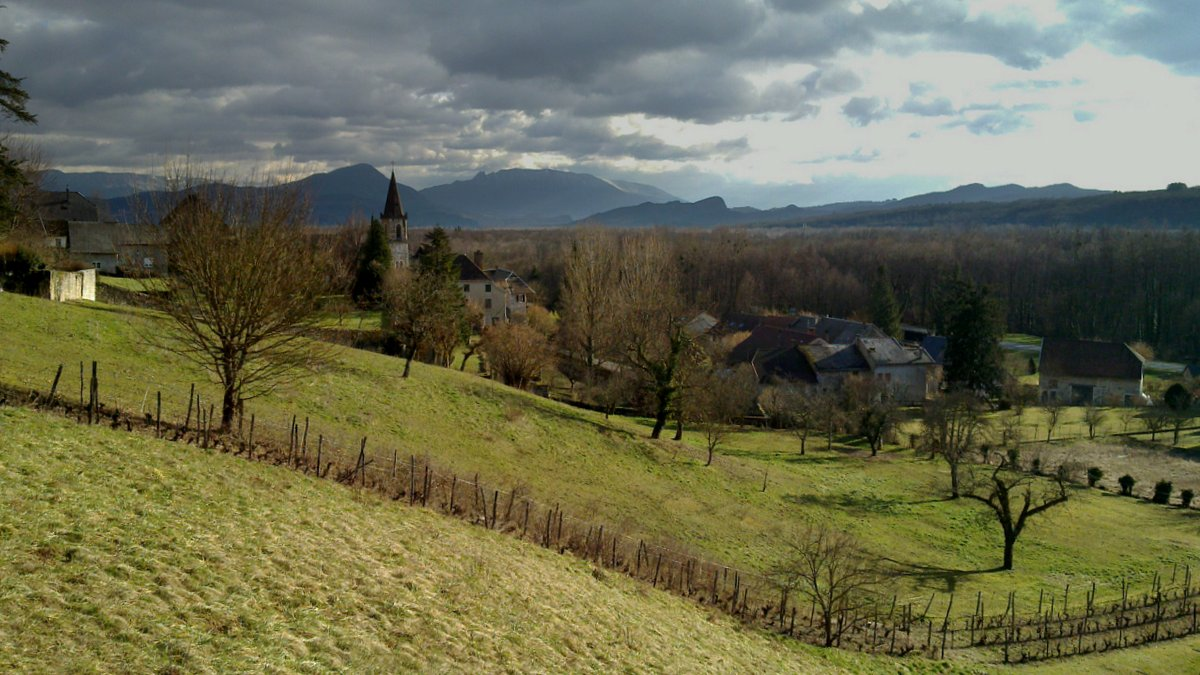
- Location of Talissieu
- Location within France Location within Auvergne-Rhône-Alpes
- Coordinates: 45°52′00″N 5°43′00″E
- Country: France
- Region: Auvergne-Rhône-Alpes
- Department: Ain
- Arrondissement: Belley
- Canton: Plateau d'Hauteville
- Intercommunality: Bugey Sud

Government
  - Mayor (2026–32): Sabrina Deguisne
- Area^{1}: 4.80 km^{2} (1.85 sq mi)
- Elevation: 240 m (790 ft)
- Highest elevation: 574 m (1,883 ft)
- Lowest elevation: 232 m (761 ft)
- Population (2023): 508
  - Density: 106/km^{2} (274/sq mi)
- Time zone: UTC+01:00 (CET)
  - Summer (DST): UTC+02:00 (CEST)
- INSEE/Postal code: 01415 /01510
- ^{1} French Land Register data, which excludes lakes, ponds, glaciers > 1 km^{2} (0.386 sq mi or 247 acres) and river estuaries.

Talissieu (French pronunciation: [talisjø]) is a commune in the Ain department in eastern France.

== Population ==
Historical population
| Year | Pop. | ±% p.a. |
|---|---|---|
| 1968 | 343 | — |
| 1975 | 317 | −1.12% |
| 1982 | 317 | +0.00% |
| 1990 | 401 | +2.98% |
| 1999 | 402 | +0.03% |
| 2007 | 466 | +1.86% |
| 2012 | 432 | −1.50% |
| 2017 | 450 | +0.82% |
| 2023 | 508 | +2.04% |
Source: INSEE

== See also ==
- Communes of the Ain department
