= Virieu-le-Petit =

Part of Arvière-en-Valromey in Auvergne-Rhône-Alpes, France

Virieu-le-Petit Veriô-le-Petit (Arpitan)
- Part of Arvière-en-Valromey
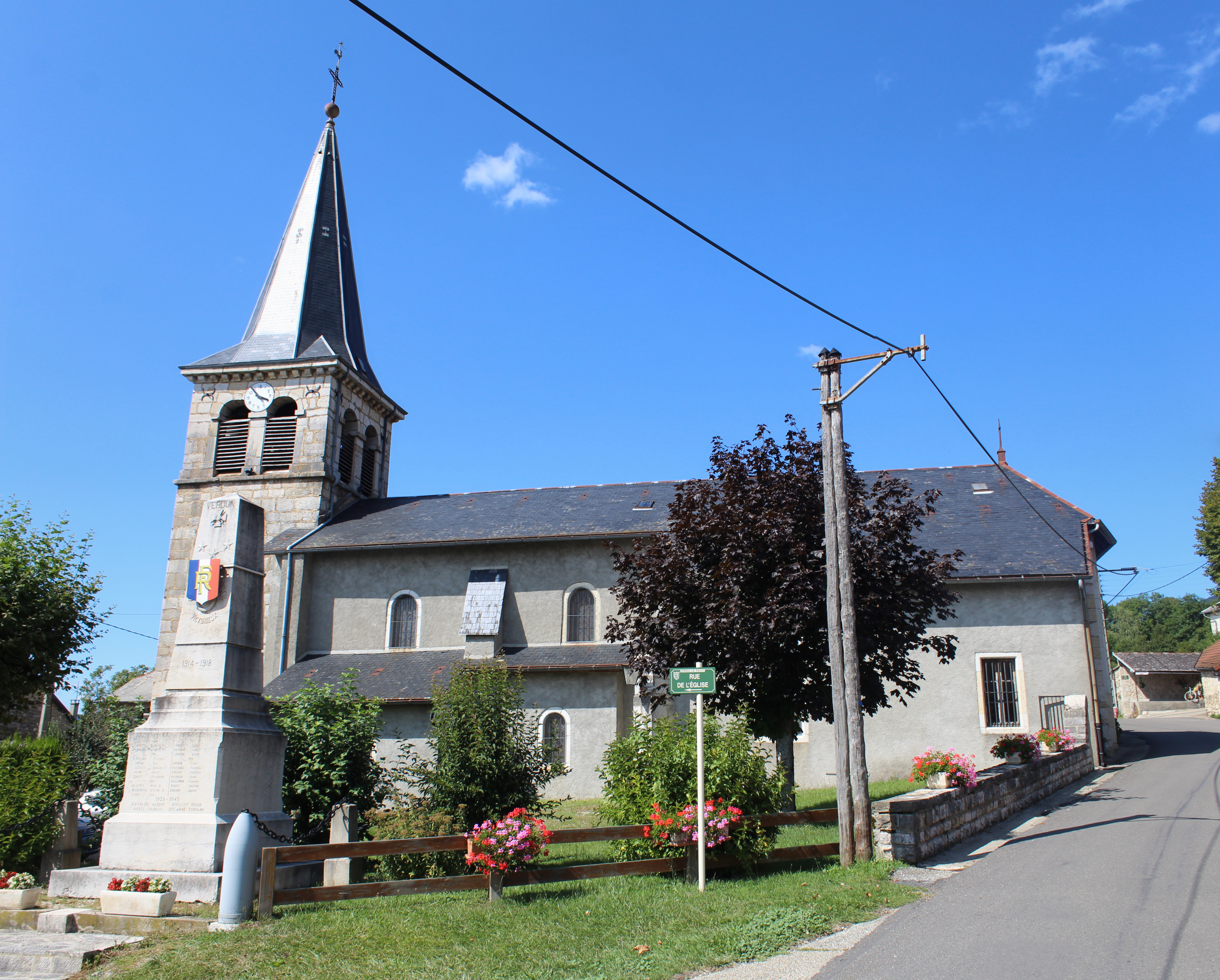
- Église St Pierre
- Location of Virieu-le-Petit
- Location within France Location within Auvergne-Rhône-Alpes
- Coordinates: 45°54′31″N 5°43′28″E
- Country: France
- Region: Auvergne-Rhône-Alpes
- Department: Ain
- Arrondissement: Belley
- Canton: Plateau d'Hauteville
- Commune: Arvière-en-Valromey
- Area^{1}: 16.4 km^{2} (6.3 sq mi)
- Elevation: 635 m (2,083 ft)
- Highest elevation: 1,524 m (5,000 ft)
- Lowest elevation: 419 m (1,375 ft)
- Population (2022): 332
  - Density: 20.2/km^{2} (52.4/sq mi)
- Time zone: UTC+01:00 (CET)
  - Summer (DST): UTC+02:00 (CEST)
- Postal code: 01260
- ^{1} French Land Register data, which excludes lakes, ponds, glaciers > 1 km^{2} (0.386 sq mi or 247 acres) and river estuaries.

Virieu-le-Petit (French pronunciation: [viʁjø lə pəti]; Arpitan: Veriô-le-Petit [və.ˈrjau l pti]) is a former commune in the Ain department in eastern France. On 1 January 2019, it was merged into the new commune Arvière-en-Valromey.

== Geography ==
=== Climate ===
Virieu-le-Petit has an oceanic climate (Köppen climate classification Cfb). The average annual temperature in Virieu-le-Petit is 11.0 °C (51.8 °F). The average annual rainfall is 1,363.9 mm (53.70 in) with November as the wettest month. The temperatures are highest on average in July, at around 20.2 °C (68.4 °F), and lowest in January, at around 1.7 °C (35.1 °F). The highest temperature ever recorded in Virieu-le-Petit was 37.6 °C (99.7 °F) on 13 August 2003; the coldest temperature ever recorded was −14.2 °C (6.4 °F) on 5 February 2012.

Climate data for Virieu-le-Petit (1981–2010 averages, extremes 1999−2018)
Month	Jan	Feb	Mar	Apr	May	Jun	Jul	Aug	Sep	Oct	Nov	Dec	Year
Record high °C (°F)	15.4 (59.7)	17.7 (63.9)	23.0 (73.4)	28.0 (82.4)	31.3 (88.3)	35.2 (95.4)	35.6 (96.1)	37.6 (99.7)	29.4 (84.9)	24.6 (76.3)	20.1 (68.2)	17.5 (63.5)	37.6 (99.7)
Mean daily maximum °C (°F)	4.9 (40.8)	6.9 (44.4)	11.4 (52.5)	15.8 (60.4)	20.0 (68.0)	24.2 (75.6)	25.8 (78.4)	24.8 (76.6)	20.7 (69.3)	15.9 (60.6)	9.1 (48.4)	5.2 (41.4)	15.4 (59.7)
Daily mean °C (°F)	1.7 (35.1)	3.0 (37.4)	6.8 (44.2)	10.6 (51.1)	14.9 (58.8)	18.6 (65.5)	20.2 (68.4)	19.5 (67.1)	15.8 (60.4)	11.8 (53.2)	5.9 (42.6)	2.2 (36.0)	11.0 (51.8)
Mean daily minimum °C (°F)	−1.4 (29.5)	−0.8 (30.6)	2.3 (36.1)	5.4 (41.7)	9.7 (49.5)	13.0 (55.4)	14.5 (58.1)	14.2 (57.6)	10.9 (51.6)	7.6 (45.7)	2.8 (37.0)	−0.8 (30.6)	6.5 (43.7)
Record low °C (°F)	−11.9 (10.6)	−14.2 (6.4)	−10.9 (12.4)	−4.5 (23.9)	1.4 (34.5)	3.2 (37.8)	7.2 (45.0)	7.7 (45.9)	2.2 (36.0)	−3.1 (26.4)	−7.2 (19.0)	−13.1 (8.4)	−14.2 (6.4)
Average precipitation mm (inches)	117.0 (4.61)	109.4 (4.31)	122.1 (4.81)	104.7 (4.12)	112.6 (4.43)	77.4 (3.05)	97.6 (3.84)	126.7 (4.99)	97.1 (3.82)	134.4 (5.29)	136.6 (5.38)	128.3 (5.05)	1,363.9 (53.70)
Average precipitation days (≥ 1.0 mm)	10.8	10.3	11.5	10.3	11.3	9.0	9.5	11.4	8.3	11.4	11.8	11.7	127.3
Source: Meteociel

== Population ==
Historical population
Year	Pop.	±% p.a.
2006	310	—
2011	307	−0.19%
2015	302	−0.41%
2022	332	+1.36%
Source: INSEE

== See also ==
- Communes of the Ain department
