= Belmont-Luthézieu =

Part of Valromey-sur-Séran in Auvergne-Rhône-Alpes, France

- Part of Valromey-sur-Séran
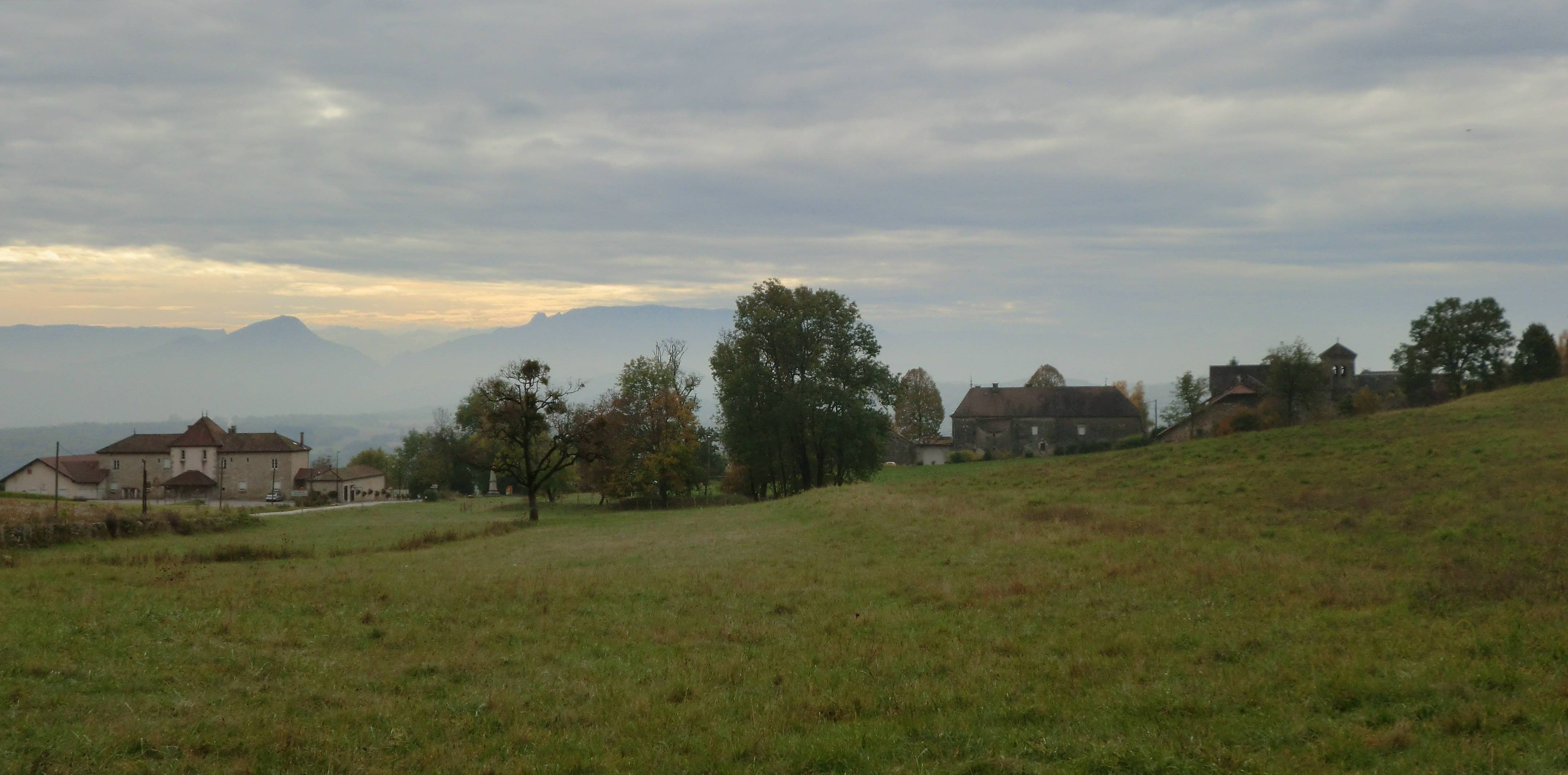
- Location of Belmont-Luthézieu
- Location within France Location within Auvergne-Rhône-Alpes
- Coordinates: 45°53′00″N 5°39′00″E
- Country: France
- Region: Auvergne-Rhône-Alpes
- Department: Ain
- Arrondissement: Belley
- Canton: Plateau d'Hauteville
- Commune: Valromey-sur-Séran
- Area^{1}: 19.77 km^{2} (7.63 sq mi)
- Elevation: 425 m (1,394 ft)
- Highest elevation: 1,104 m (3,622 ft)
- Lowest elevation: 251 m (823 ft)
- Population (2022): 611
  - Density: 30.9/km^{2} (80.0/sq mi)
- Time zone: UTC+01:00 (CET)
  - Summer (DST): UTC+02:00 (CEST)
- Postal code: 01260
- ^{1} French Land Register data, which excludes lakes, ponds, glaciers > 1 km^{2} (0.386 sq mi or 247 acres) and river estuaries.

Belmont-Luthézieu (French pronunciation: [bɛlmɔ̃ lytezjø]) is a former commune in the Ain department in eastern France. On 1 January 2019, it was merged into the new commune Valromey-sur-Séran.

== Geography ==
The commune is 18 km north of Belley. There are several waterfalls, gorges and caves in a forested environment.

== Population ==
Historical population
Year	Pop.	±% p.a.
2006	461	—
2011	527	+2.71%
2015	572	+2.07%
2022	611	+0.95%
Source: INSEE

== History ==
The priory of Belmont was founded in 1110. It has been in the parish of Luthézieu since the 12th century.

== Mayors ==
Name	Elected	Left office
André Michaud	1995	2001
Jean-Baptiste Zambelli	2001	2014
Pauline Godet	2014	2018

== See also ==
- Communes of the Ain department
