= Grand Colombier (Ain) =

French mountain

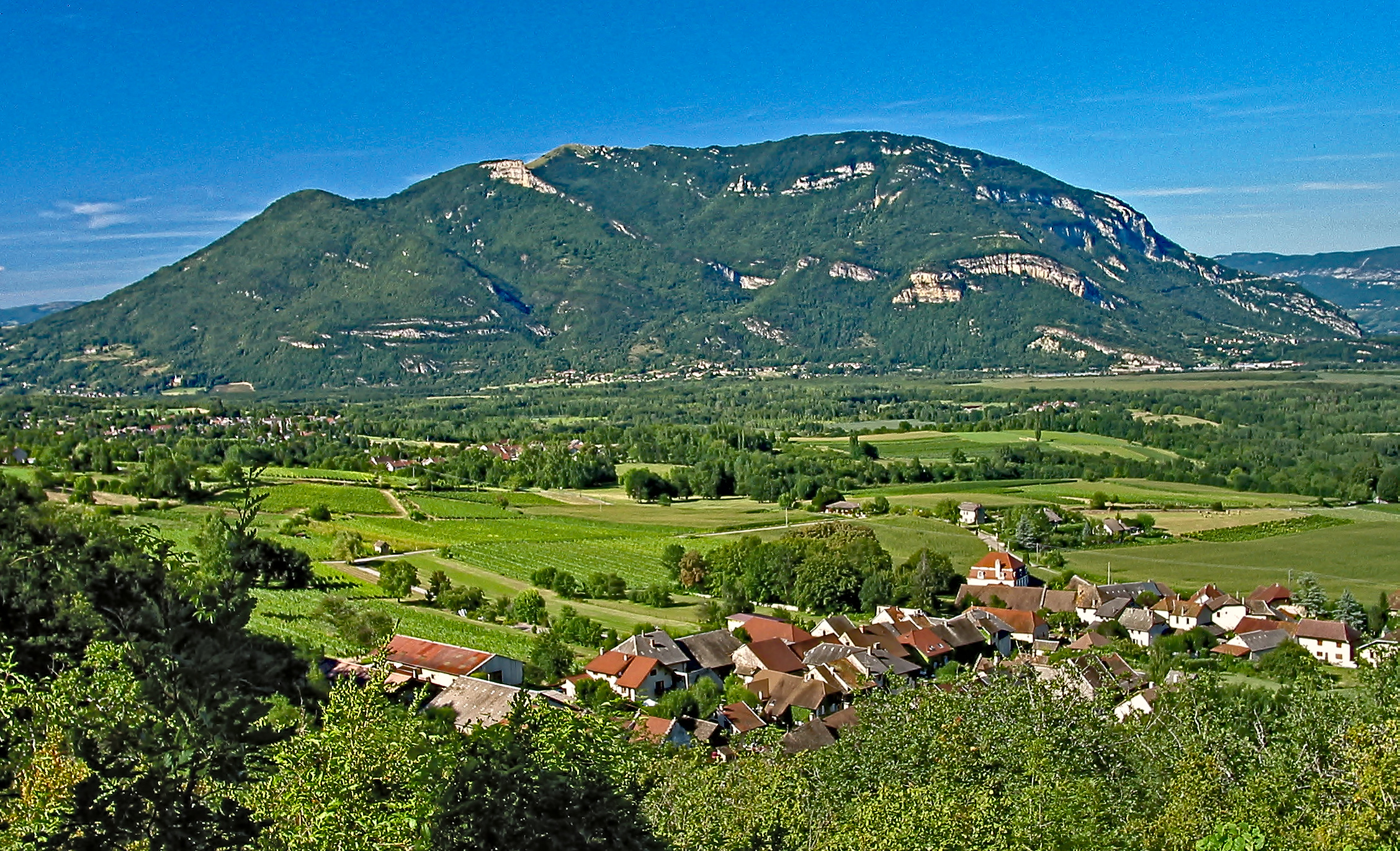

Highest point
- Elevation: 1,534 m (5,033 ft)
- Prominence: 928 m (3,045 ft)
- Isolation: 27.55 km (17.12 mi)
- Coordinates: 45°53′57″N 5°45′40″E

Geography
- Location within France
- Location: Ain, France
- Parent range: Jura Mountains

Grand Colombier (el. 1534 m) is a mountain in the Ain department in eastern France.

It lies in the area of Bugey.
