= Champagne-en-Valromey =

Commune in Auvergne-Rhône-Alpes, France

- Commune
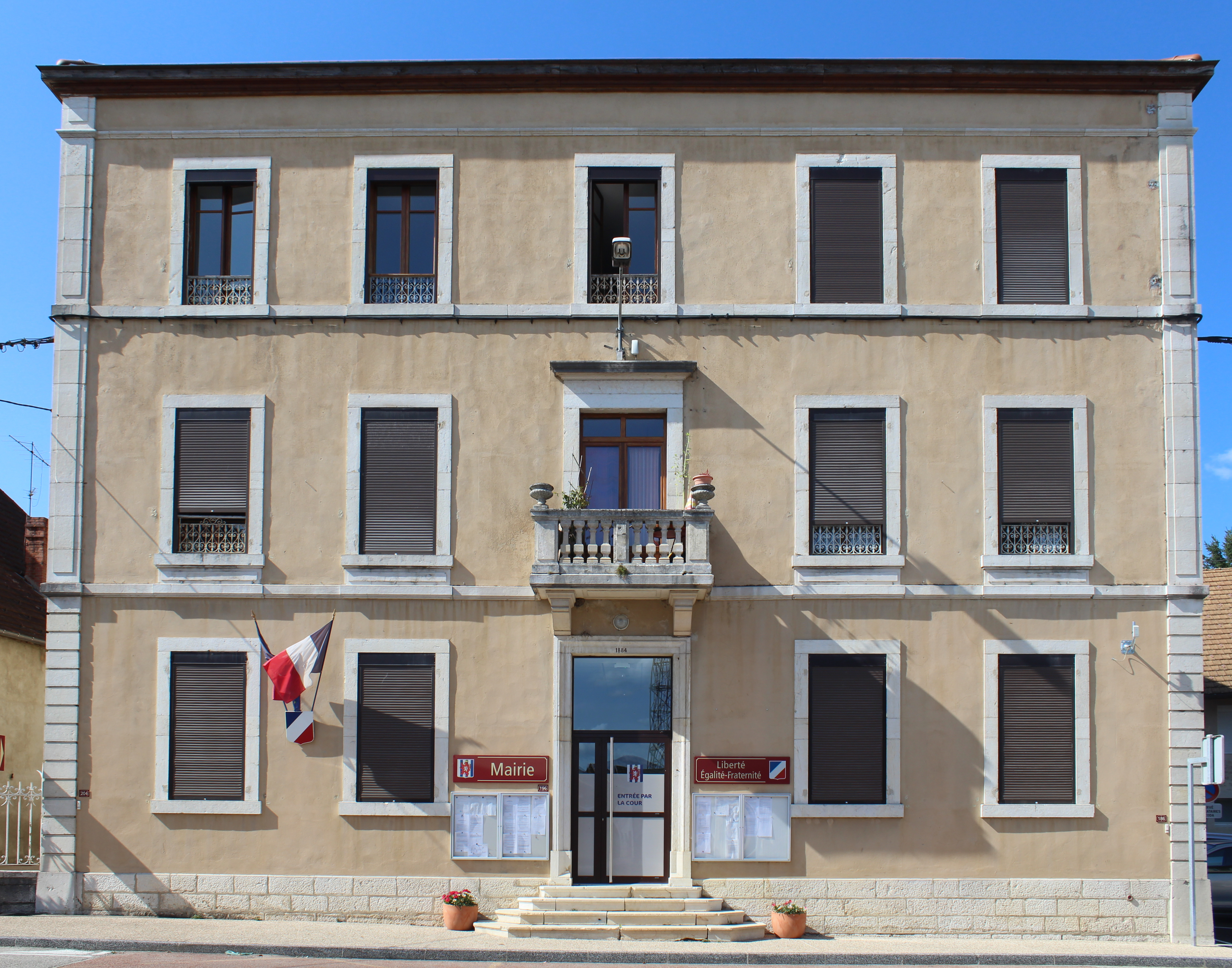
- Town hall

- Coat of arms
- Location of Champagne-en-Valromey
- Location within France Location within Auvergne-Rhône-Alpes
- Coordinates: 45°54′00″N 5°41′00″E
- Country: France
- Region: Auvergne-Rhône-Alpes
- Department: Ain
- Arrondissement: Belley
- Canton: Plateau d'Hauteville
- Intercommunality: Bugey Sud

Government
  - Mayor (2026–32): Christophe Michaille
- Area^{1}: 18.16 km^{2} (7.01 sq mi)
- Elevation: 530 m (1,740 ft)
- Highest elevation: 746 m (2,448 ft)
- Lowest elevation: 419 m (1,375 ft)
- Population (2023): 831
  - Density: 45.8/km^{2} (119/sq mi)
- Time zone: UTC+01:00 (CET)
  - Summer (DST): UTC+02:00 (CEST)
- INSEE/Postal code: 01079 /01260
- ^{1} French Land Register data, which excludes lakes, ponds, glaciers > 1 km^{2} (0.386 sq mi or 247 acres) and river estuaries.

Champagne-en-Valromey (French pronunciation: [ʃɑ̃paɲ ɑ̃ valʁɔmɛ]) is a commune in the Ain department in eastern France. In 1973 it absorbed two former communes: Lilignod and Passin.

It is part of the wine region Coteaux de l'Ain, subregion Valromey.

== Population ==
Historical population
Year	Pop.	±% p.a.
1968	720	—
1975	687	−0.67%
1982	714	+0.55%
1990	667	−0.85%
1999	674	+0.12%
2007	716	+0.76%
2012	788	+1.93%
2017	820	+0.80%
2023	831	+0.22%
Source: INSEE

== See also ==
- Communes of the Ain department
