= List of new French communes created in 2019 =

The following French communes were created by prefectural decrees that defined a date of creation between 1 January 2019 and 31 December 2019.

This list contains 241 new communes regrouping 630 previous communes.

== Legislative history ==
The law n^{o} 2010-1563 of 16 December 2010 to reform local authorities replaced the previous regime of merging communes defined in the "Marcellin" law of 16 July 1971 with a renewed consolidation procedure, resulting in the creation of a "new commune". It was supplemented in 2015 by a new law n^{o} 2015-292 of 16 March 2015 relating to the improvement of the regime of the new commune, for strong and lively communes, setting up temporary financial incentives in order to promote the creation of new municipalities before 1 January 2019.

== Enumeration ==
=== Number of new communes created in 2019 ===
238 new communes were created on 1 January 2019. They regrouped 624 former communes. 2 new communes were created on 28 February 2019. They regrouped 4 former communes, while 1 more new commune was created on 1 March 2019 regrouping 2 former communes.

=== Total number of communes in France ===
On 1 March 2019, the French Republic counted 34,967 communes, of which 34,838 are located in metropolitan France and 129 in overseas departments and regions.

Year	Date	Metropolitan France			Overseas departments and regions	Total
Year	Date	New communes	Regrouped communes	Total # of communes	Overseas departments and regions	Total
2018	31 December 2018			35,227	129	35,356
2021	1 January 2019	238	624	34,841	129	34,970
2021	28 February 2019	2	4	34,839	129	34,968
2021	1 March 2019	1	2	34,838	129	34,967
2021	Total	241	630	34,835	129	34,967

== Detailed list ==
Article L. 2113-6 of the general code of local and regional authorities (CGCT) specifies that "the decree of the representative of the State in the department pronouncing the creation of the new municipality determines the name of the new municipality, if necessary in view of the opinions issued by the municipal councils, fixes the date of creation and in full, in as needed, the terms". The following table presents these indicators for each of the new communes created in 2019: name, date of the prefectural decree announcing its creation, date of creation and multiple modalities (existence of delegated communities, seat of the commune), or complementary information (population).

Department	#	New communes				Former Communes			Date of prefectural decree	Date of creation
Department	#	Name	Code INSEE	Seat	Population (2015)	#	Names	Delegated commune	Date of prefectural decree	Date of creation
Ain	7	Arvière-en-Valromey	01453	Virieu-le-Petit	715	4	Brénaz — Chavornay — Lochieu — Virieu-le-Petit	Yes	17 December 2018	1 January 2019
Ain	7	Bresse Vallons	01130	Cras-sur-Reyssouze	2,251	2	Cras-sur-Reyssouze — Étrez	Yes	21 December 2018	1 January 2019
Ain	7	Magnieu	01227	Magnieu	635	2	Magnieu — Saint-Champ	Yes	23 November 2018	1 January 2019
Ain	7	Plateau d'Hauteville	01185	Hauteville-Lompnes	4,929	4	Cormaranche-en-Bugey — Hauteville-Lompnes — Hostiaz — Thézillieu	Yes	12 December 2018	1 January 2019
Ain	7	Surjoux-Lhopital	01215	Lhôpital	119	2	Surjoux — Lhôpital	Yes	3 December 2018	1 January 2019
Ain	7	Valromey-sur-Séran	01036	Belmont-Luthézieu	1,275	4	Belmont-Luthézieu — Lompnieu, Sutrie — Vieu	Yes	17 December 2018	1 January 2019
Ain	7	Valserhône	01033	Bellegarde-sur-Valserine	16,303	3	Bellegarde-sur-Valserine — Châtillon-en-Michaille — Lancrans	Yes	22 October 2018	1 January 2019
Aisne	3	Anizy-le-Grand	02018	Anizy-le-Château	2,579	3	Anizy-le-Château — Faucoucourt — Lizy	Yes	22 October 2018	1 January 2019
Aisne	3	Cessières-Suzy	02153	Cessières	781	2	Cessières — Suzy	Yes	11 December 2018	1 January 2019
Aisne	3	Villeneuve-sur-Aisne	02360	Guignicourt	2,642	2	Guignicourt — Menneville	Yes	29 November 2018	1 January 2019
Hautes-Alpes	1	Abriès-Ristolas	05001	Abriès	379	2	Abriès — Ristolas	Yes	19 October 2018	1 January 2019
Ardèche	4	Belsentes	07165	Nonières	548	2	Nonières — Saint-Julien-Labrousse	Yes	12 December 2018	1 January 2019
Ardèche	4	Saint-Julien-d'Intres	07103	Intres	358	2	Intres — Saint-Julien-Boutières	No	12 December 2018	1 January 2019
Ardèche	4	Saint-Laurent-les-Bains-Laval-d'Aurelle	07262	Saint-Laurent-les-Bains	183	2	Laval-d'Aurelle — Saint-Laurent-les-Bains	Yes	29 October 2018	1 January 2019
Ardèche	4	Vallées-d'Antraigues-Asperjoc	07011	Antraigues-sur-Volane	969	2	Antraigues-sur-Volane — Asperjoc	Yes	29 October 2018	1 January 2019
Ardennes	1	Flize	08173	Flize	1,717	4	Balaives-et-Butz — Boutancourt — Élan — Flize	Yes	23 November 2018	1 January 2019
Ariège	2	Aulos-Sinsat	09296	Sinsat	172	2	Aulos — Sinsat	Yes	27 September 2018	1 January 2019
Ariège	2	Val-de-Sos	09334	Vicdessos	656	4	Goulier — Sem — Suc-et-Sentenac — Vicdessos	Yes	27 July 2018	1 January 2019
Vienne	3	Boivre-la-Vallée	86123	Lavausseau	3,194	4	Benassay — La Chapelle-Montreuil — Lavausseau — Montreuil-Bonnin	Yes	21 September 2018	1 January 2019
Vienne	3	Saint-Martin-la-Pallu	86281	Vendeuvre-du-Poitou	5,647	2	Saint Martin la Pallu (previously formed out of the former communes of Blaslay, Charrais, Cheneché et Vendeuvre-du-Poitou) — Varennes	Yes (5)	21 September 2018	1 January 2019
Vienne	3	Valence-en-Poitou	86082	Couhé	4,419	5	Ceaux-en-Couhé — Châtillon — Couhé — Payré — Vaux	Yes	22 November 2018	1 January 2019
Haute-Vienne	2	Saint-Pardoux-le-Lac	87128	Roussac	1,312	3	Roussac — Saint-Pardoux — Saint-Symphorien-sur-Couze	Yes	26 November 2018	1 January 2019
Haute-Vienne	2	Val-d'Oire-et-Gartempe	87028	Bussière-Poitevine	1,732	4	Bussière-Poitevine — Darnac — Saint-Barbant — Thiat	Yes	3 August 2018	1 January 2019
Yonne	2	Guillon-Terre-Plaine	89197	Guillon	789	5	Cisery — Guillon — Sceaux — Trévilly — Vignes	Yes	24 December 2018	1 January 2019
Yonne	2	Treigny-Perreuse-Sainte-Colombe	89420	Treigny	1,070	2	Sainte-Colombe-sur-Loing — Treigny	Yes (3 including Perreuse, an associated commune of Treigny)	29 November 2018	1 January 2019
Territoire de Belfort	1	Meroux-Moval	90068	Meroux	1,283	2	Meroux — Moval	Yes	21 December 2018	1 January 2019
Essonne	2	Évry-Courcouronnes	91228	Évry	68,098	2	Courcouronnes — Évry	Yes	12 October 2018	1 January 2019
Essonne	2	Le Mérévillois	91390	Méréville	3,462	2	Estouches — Méréville	Yes	28 September 2018	1 January 2019

== See also ==
=== Related articles ===
- List of new French commune projects
- List of new French communes created in 2015
- List of new French communes created in 2016
- List of new French communes created in 2017
- List of new French communes created in 2018
- List of new French communes created in 2021
- List of new French communes created in 2022
