= Aulos, Ariège =

Aulos
- Part of Aulos-Sinsat
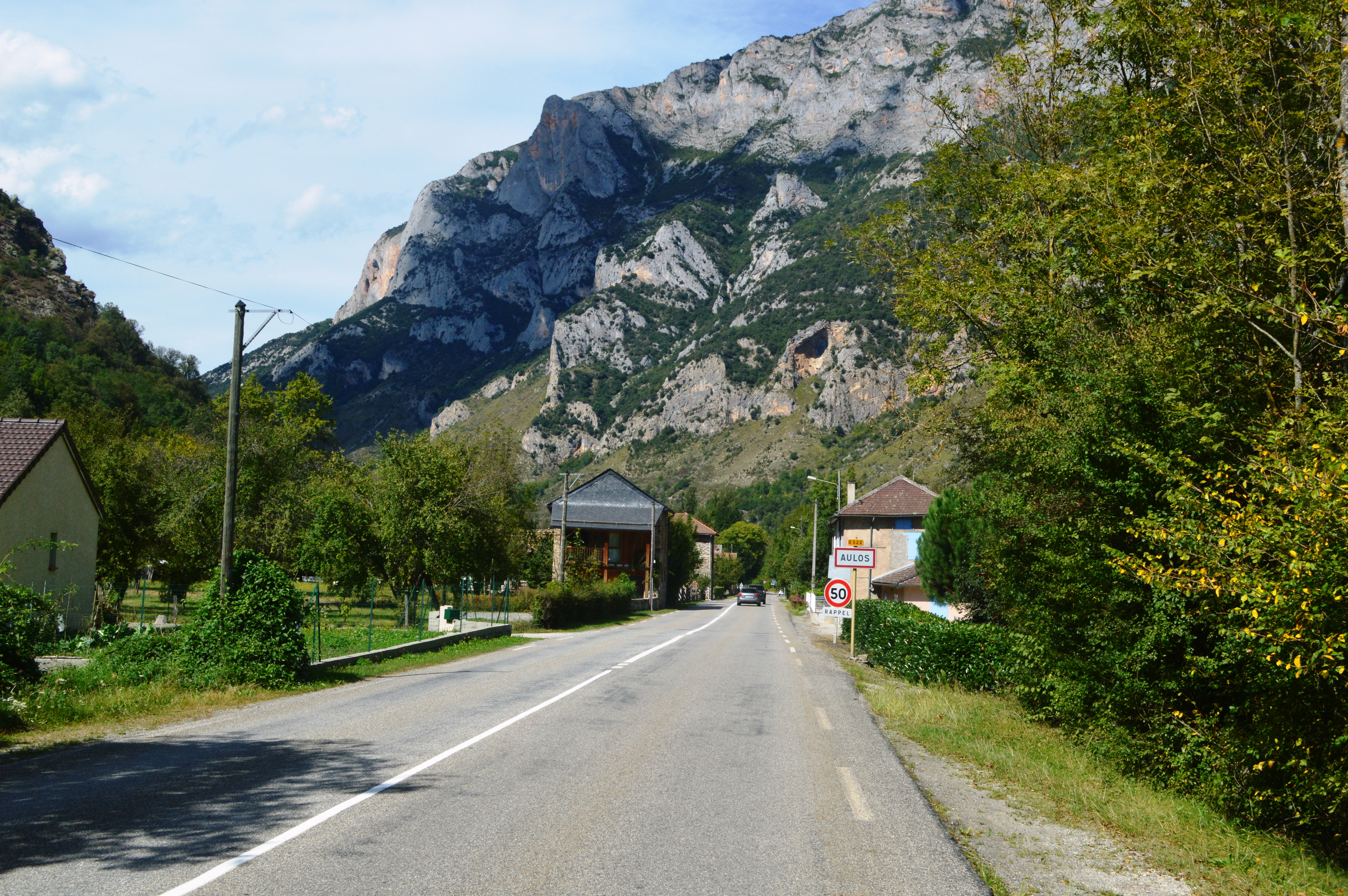
- The entry to Aulos
- Location of Aulos
- Location within France Location within Occitanie
- Coordinates: 42°47′36″N 1°40′33″E
- Country: France
- Region: Occitania
- Department: Ariège
- Arrondissement: Foix
- Canton: Haute-Ariège
- Commune: Aulos-Sinsat
- Area^{1}: 1.04 km^{2} (0.40 sq mi)
- Elevation: 612 m (2,008 ft)
- Highest elevation: 968 m (3,176 ft)
- Lowest elevation: 513 m (1,683 ft)
- Population (2021): 54
  - Density: 52/km^{2} (130/sq mi)
- Time zone: UTC+01:00 (CET)
  - Summer (DST): UTC+02:00 (CEST)
- Postal code: 09310
- ^{1} French Land Register data, which excludes lakes, ponds, glaciers > 1 km^{2} (0.386 sq mi or 247 acres) and river estuaries.

Aulos is a former commune in the Ariège department in the Occitanie region of south-western France. On 1 January 2019, it was merged into the new commune Aulos-Sinsat.

== Geography ==
Aulos is located some 12 km south-east of Tarascon-sur-Ariège and 22 km north-west of Ax-les-Thermes. Access to the commune is by Route nationale 20 from Sinsat in the north-west passing through the north of the commune and continuing south-east to Luzenac. Access to the village is by the D522 road which branches off the N20 in the commune and goes south-east through the village continuing to Les Cabannes. A railway line passes through the commune with the nearest station at Les Cabannes. Most of the commune is heavily forested with a strip of farmland along the N20 and the D522.

The river Ariège forms the whole eastern border of the commune with no tributaries passing through the commune.

== Administration ==
List of Successive Mayors

From	To	Name
2001	2019	Jean-Yves Cencigh

== Demography ==
The inhabitants of the commune are known as Aulosois or Aulosoises in French.

Historical population

Year	Pop.	±% p.a.
1800	77	—
1821	101	+1.30%
1846	122	+0.76%
1872	95	−0.96%
1901	105	+0.35%
1926	79	−1.13%
1946	73	−0.39%
1962	71	−0.17%

Year	Pop.	±% p.a.
1968	91	+4.22%
1975	81	−1.65%
1982	60	−4.20%
1990	38	−5.55%
1999	60	+5.21%
2007	56	−0.86%
2012	56	+0.00%
2021	54	−0.40%

Source: EHESS and INSEE

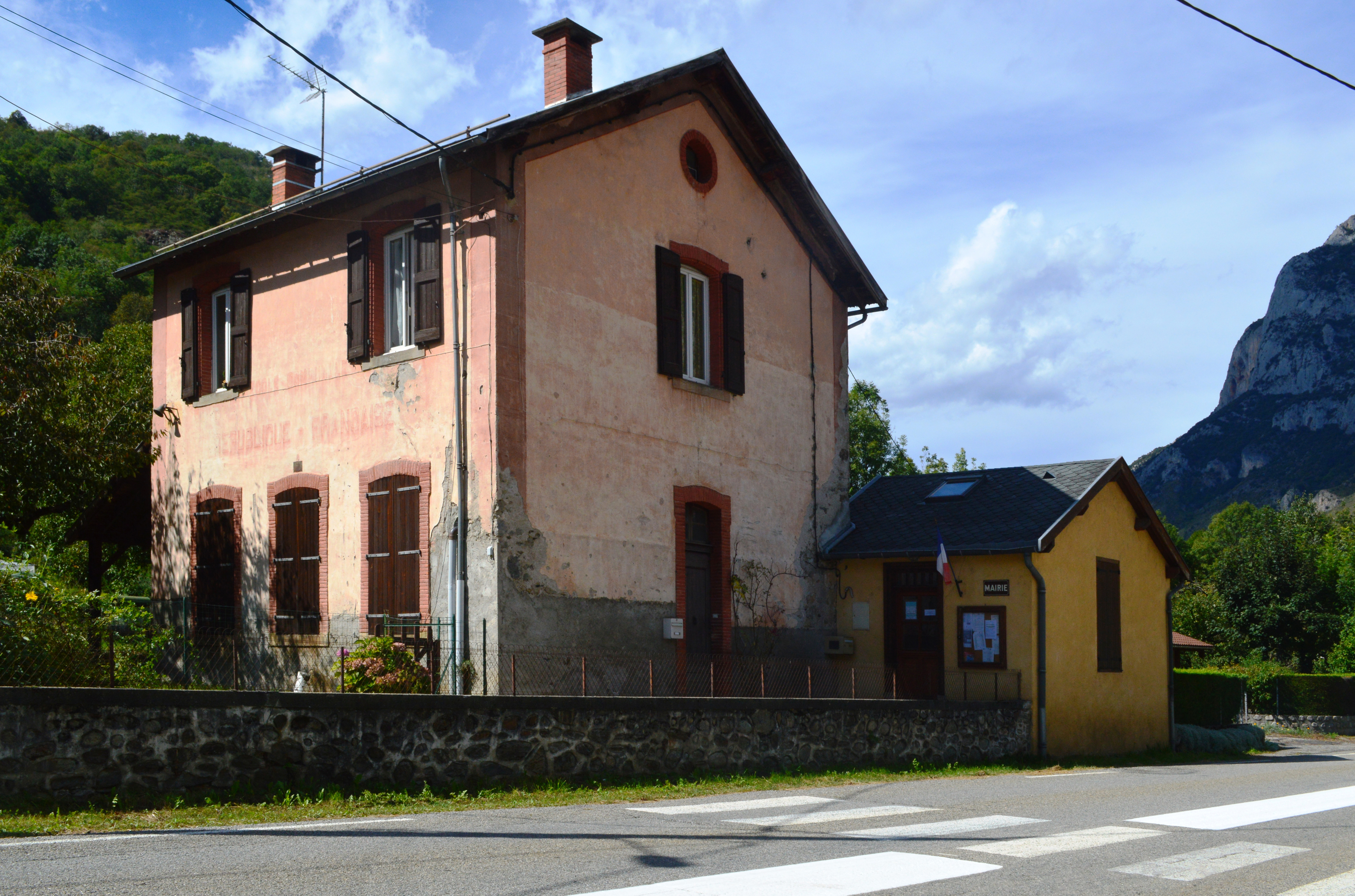
Aulos Town Hall

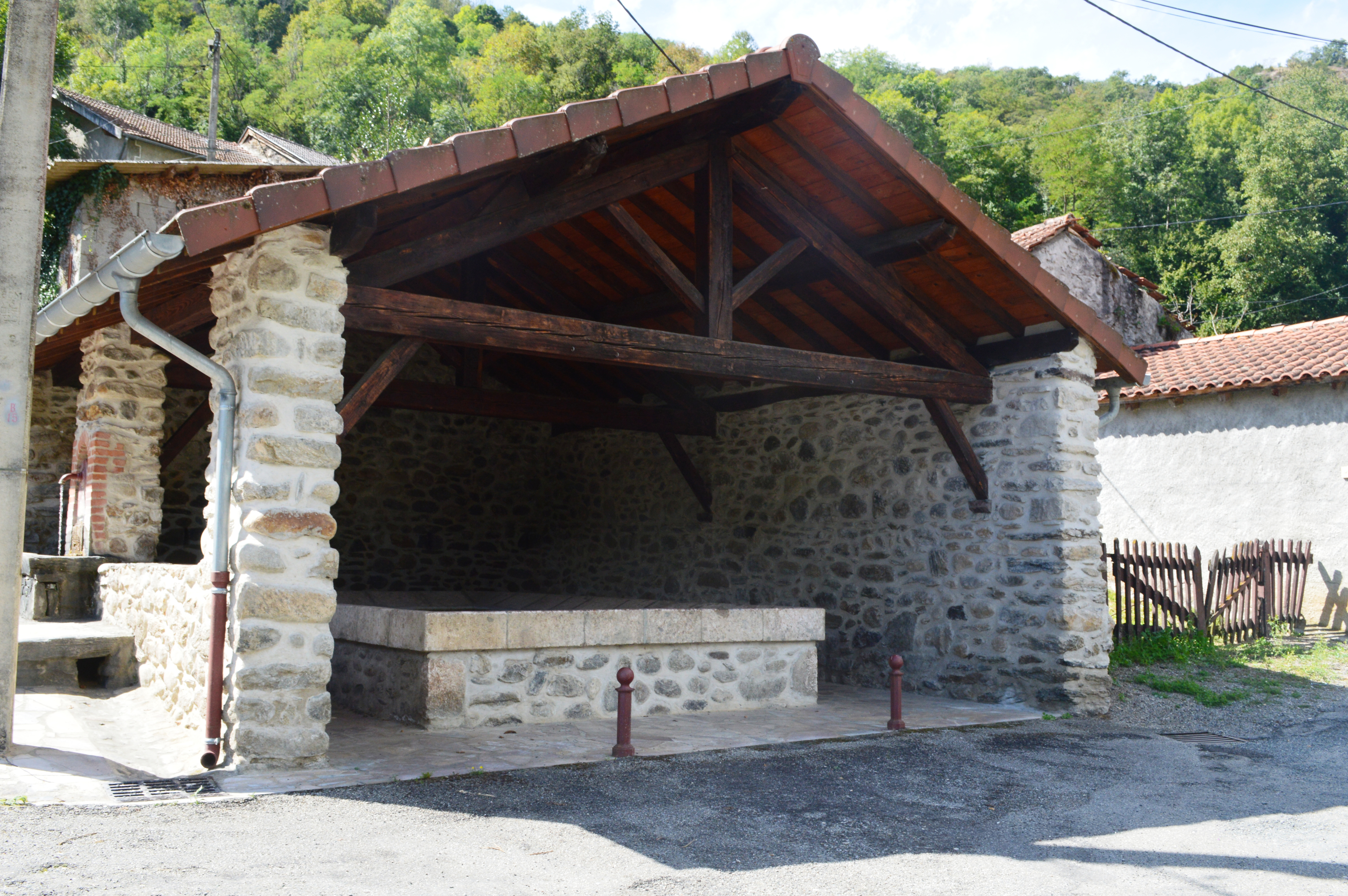
Aulos Lavoir (Public Laundry)

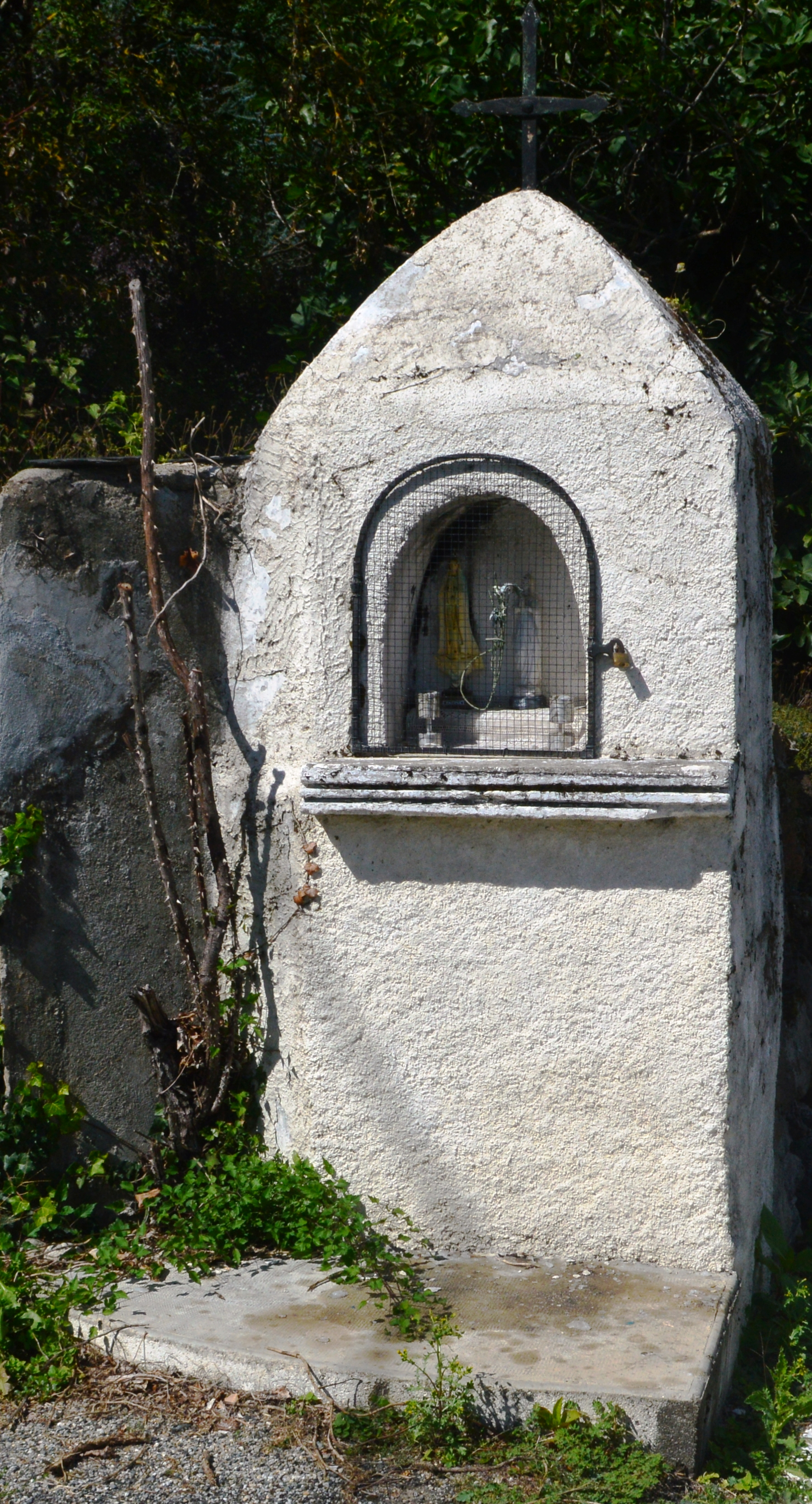
An Oratory in Aulos

== See also ==
- Communes of the Ariège department
