= Varennes, Vienne =

Varennes
- Part of Saint-Martin-la-Pallu
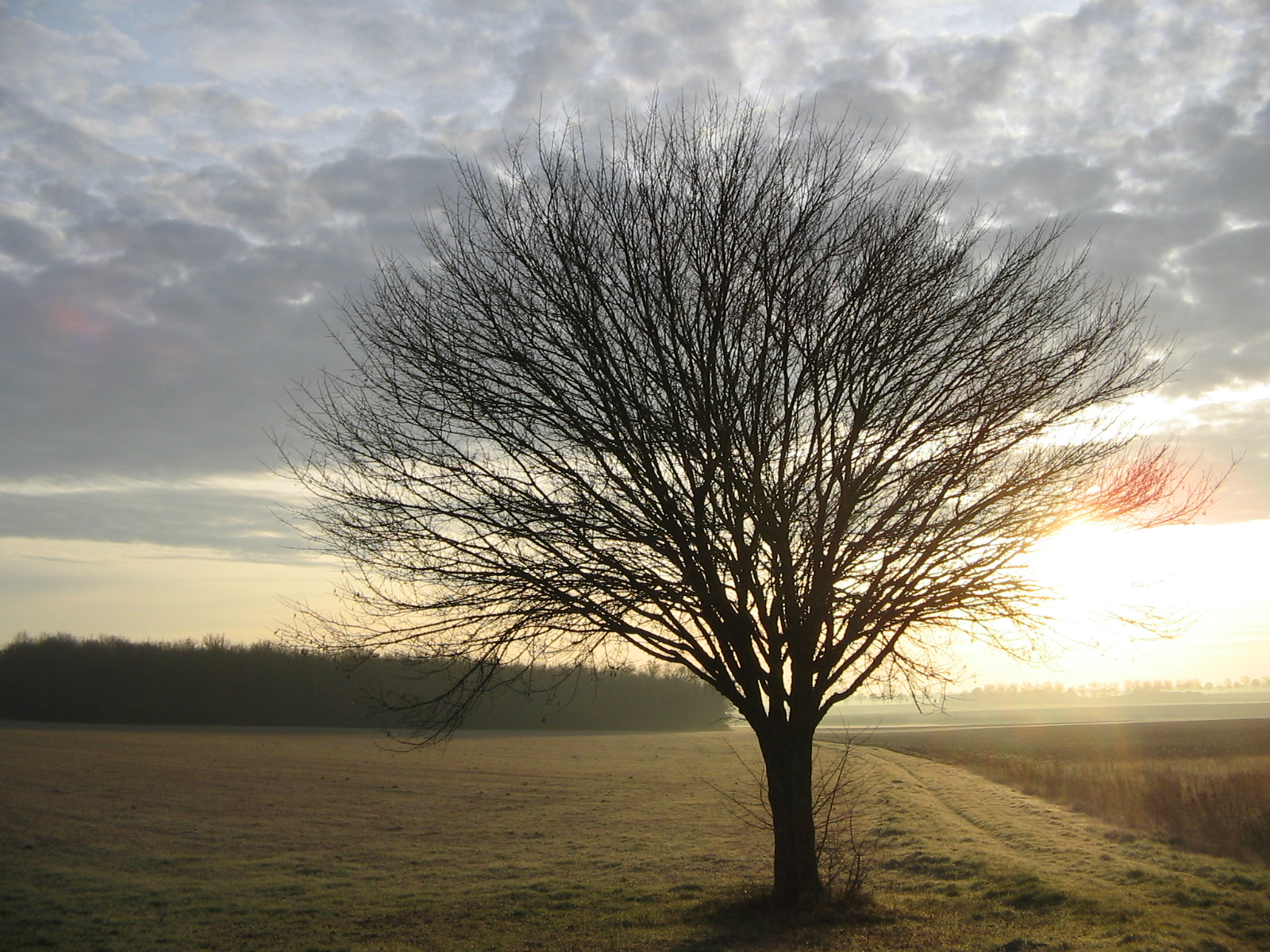
- The February landscape of Varennes
- Location of Varennes
- Location within France Location within Nouvelle-Aquitaine
- Coordinates: 46°45′34″N 0°12′00″E
- Country: France
- Region: Nouvelle-Aquitaine
- Department: Vienne
- Arrondissement: Poitiers
- Canton: Migné-Auxances
- Commune: Saint-Martin-la-Pallu
- Area^{1}: 12.80 km^{2} (4.94 sq mi)
- Elevation: 96 m (315 ft)
- Highest elevation: 159 m (522 ft)
- Lowest elevation: 88 m (289 ft)
- Population (2022): 356
  - Density: 27.8/km^{2} (72.0/sq mi)
- Time zone: UTC+01:00 (CET)
  - Summer (DST): UTC+02:00 (CEST)
- Postal code: 86110
- ^{1} French Land Register data, which excludes lakes, ponds, glaciers > 1 km^{2} (0.386 sq mi or 247 acres) and river estuaries.

Varennes (French pronunciation: [vaʁɛn]) is a former commune in the Vienne department in the Nouvelle-Aquitaine region in western France. On 1 January 2019, it was merged into the commune Saint-Martin-la-Pallu.

== See also ==
- Communes of the Vienne department
