= Lhôpital =

Commune in Ain, France

- Part of Surjoux-Lhopital
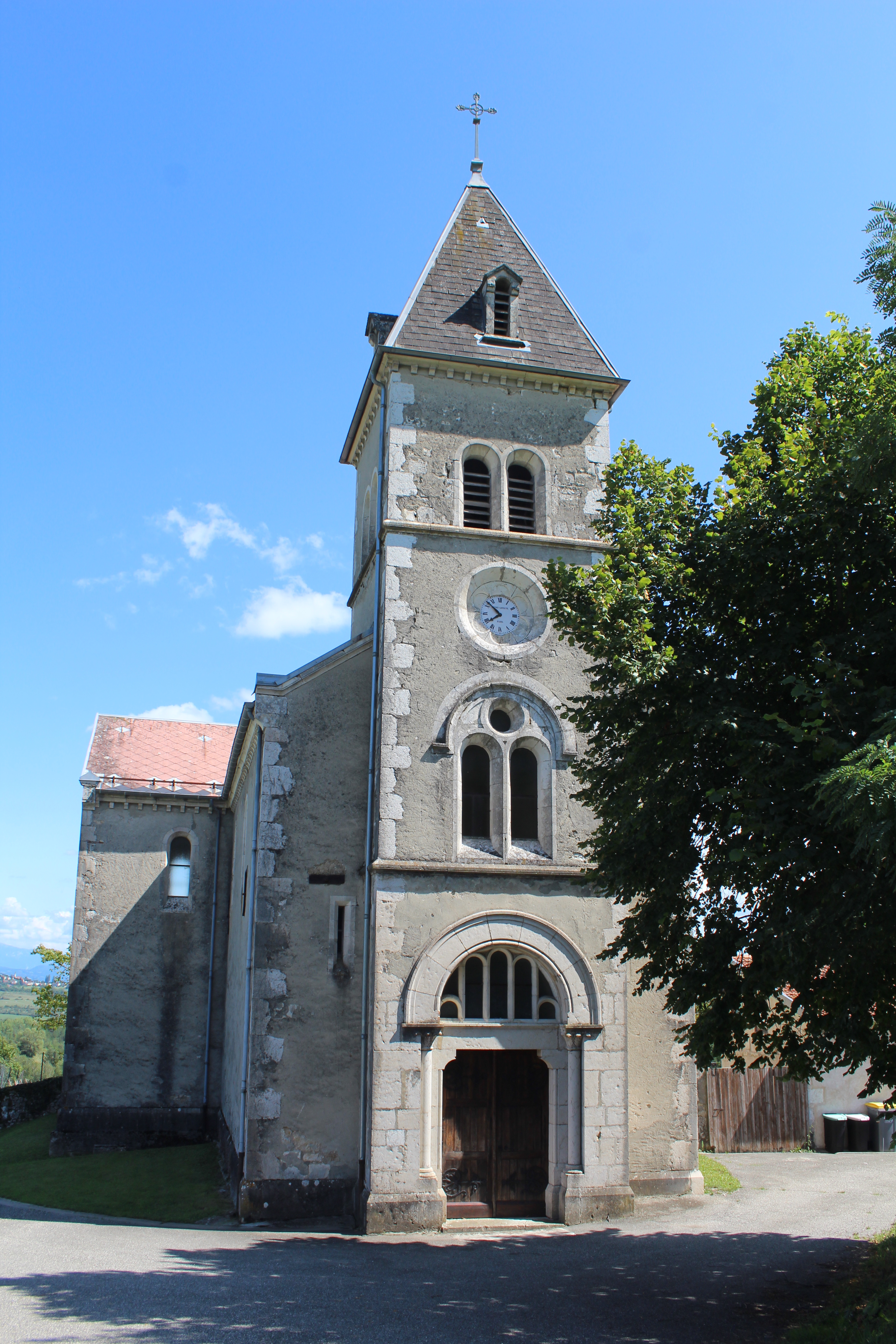
- Église St Jean Baptiste
- Location of Lhôpital
- Location within France Location within Auvergne-Rhône-Alpes
- Coordinates: 46°01′19″N 5°46′45″E
- Country: France
- Region: Auvergne-Rhône-Alpes
- Department: Ain
- Arrondissement: Nantua
- Canton: Bellegarde-sur-Valserine
- Commune: Surjoux-Lhopital
- Area^{1}: 3.7 km^{2} (1.4 sq mi)
- Elevation: 490 m (1,610 ft)
- Highest elevation: 1,160 m (3,810 ft)
- Lowest elevation: 395 m (1,296 ft)
- Population (2022): 45
  - Density: 12/km^{2} (31/sq mi)
- Time zone: UTC+01:00 (CET)
  - Summer (DST): UTC+02:00 (CEST)
- Postal code: 01420
- ^{1} French Land Register data, which excludes lakes, ponds, glaciers > 1 km^{2} (0.386 sq mi or 247 acres) and river estuaries.

Lhôpital (French pronunciation: [lopital]) is a former commune in the Ain department in eastern France. On 1 January 2019, it was merged into the new commune of Surjoux-Lhopital.

== Population ==
Historical population
Year	Pop.	±% p.a.
2006	56	—
2011	56	+0.00%
2015	47	−4.29%
2022	45	−0.62%
Source: INSEE

== See also ==
- Communes of the Ain department
