= Meroux =

Commune in Territoire de Belfort, France

- Part of Meroux-Moval
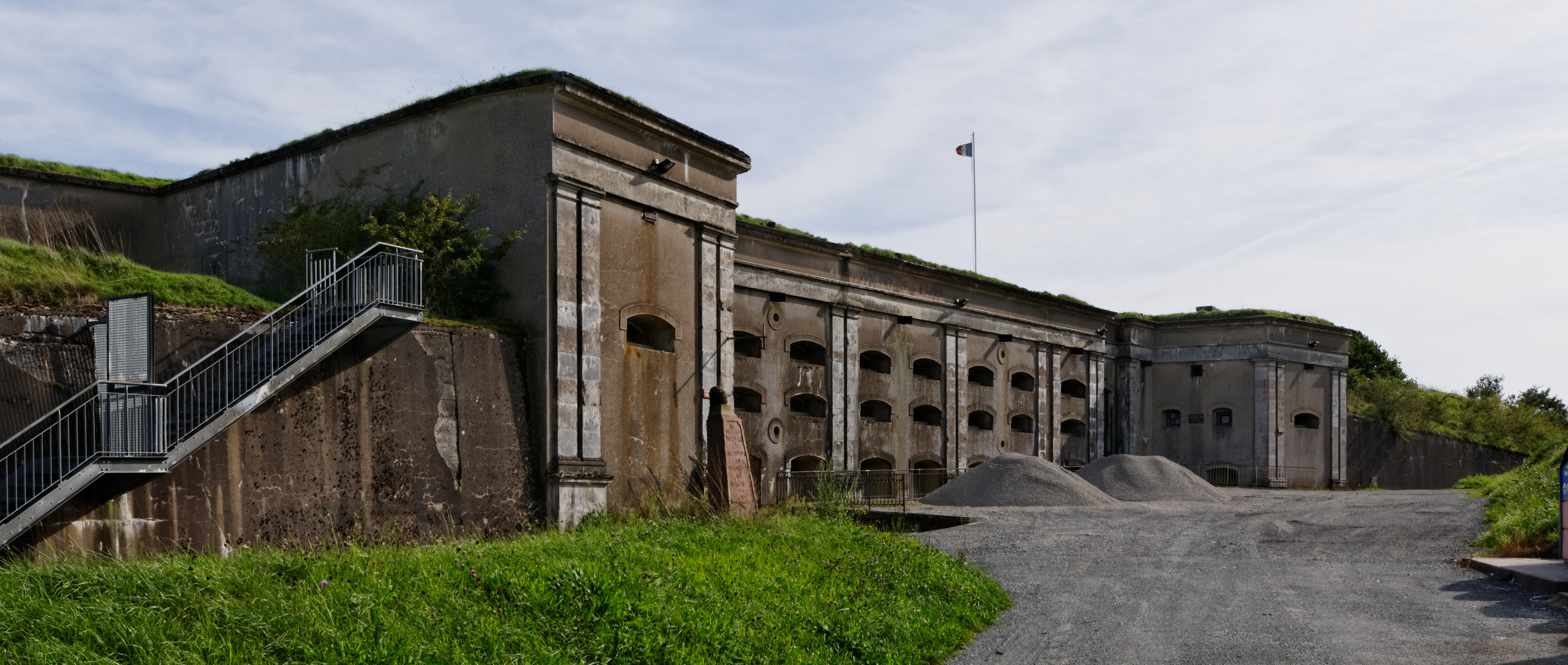
- Ouvrage de Meroux, by Thomas Bresson

- Coat of arms
- Location of Meroux
- Location within France Location within Bourgogne-Franche-Comté
- Coordinates: 47°35′47″N 6°54′01″E
- Country: France
- Region: Bourgogne-Franche-Comté
- Department: Territoire de Belfort
- Arrondissement: Belfort
- Canton: Châtenois-les-Forges
- Commune: Meroux-Moval
- Area^{1}: 8.85 km^{2} (3.42 sq mi)
- Highest elevation: 406 m (1,332 ft)
- Lowest elevation: 340 m (1,120 ft)
- Population (2019): 898
  - Density: 101/km^{2} (263/sq mi)
- Time zone: UTC+01:00 (CET)
  - Summer (DST): UTC+02:00 (CEST)
- Postal code: 90400
- ^{1} French Land Register data, which excludes lakes, ponds, glaciers > 1 km^{2} (0.386 sq mi or 247 acres) and river estuaries.

Meroux (French pronunciation: [meʁu], pronounced as Méroux) is a former commune in the Territoire de Belfort department in Bourgogne-Franche-Comté in northeastern France. On 1 January 2019, it was merged into the new commune of Meroux-Moval.

== See also ==
- Communes of the Territoire de Belfort department
