= Nonières =

- Part of Belsentes
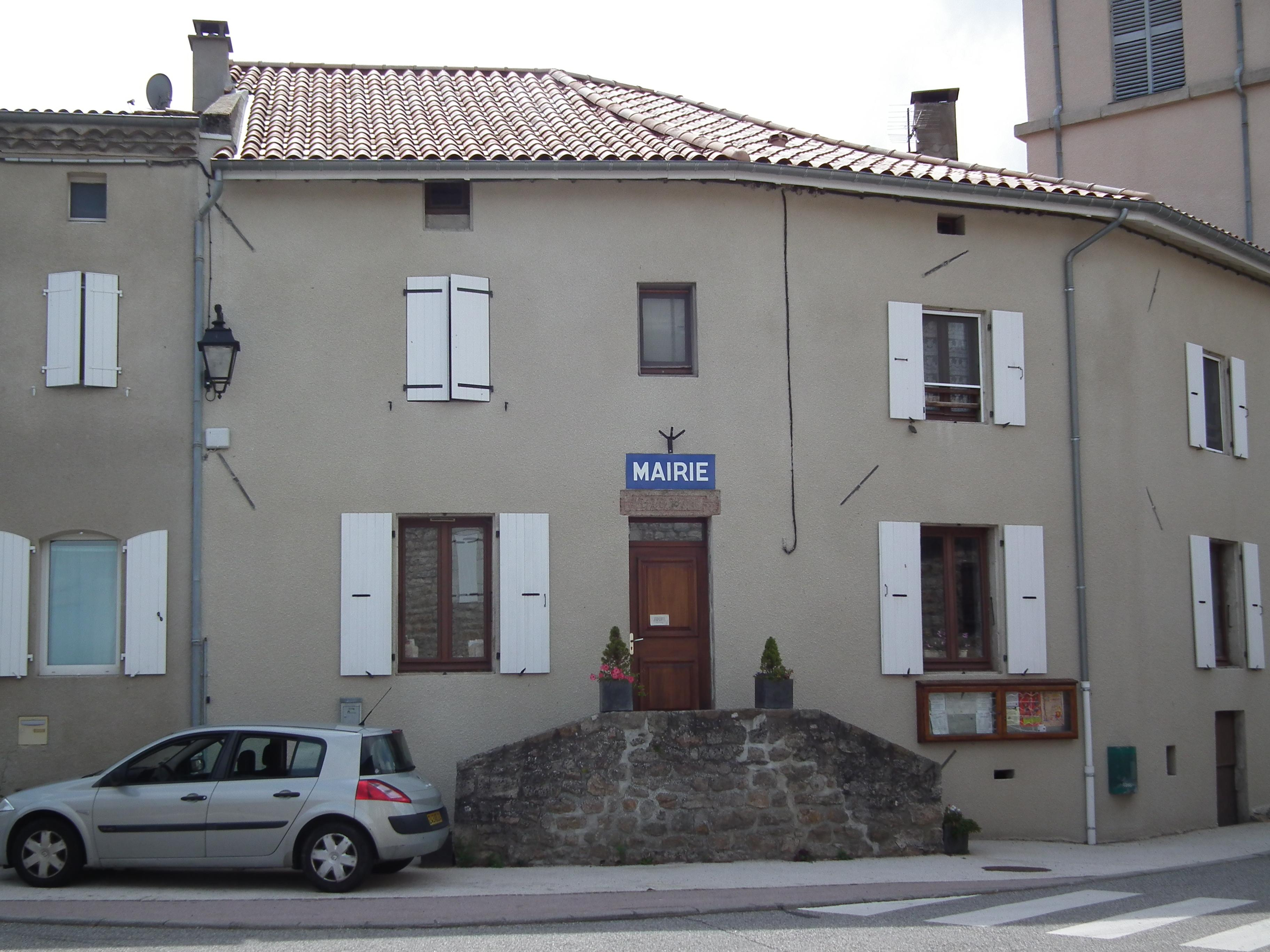
- Town hall
- Location of Nonières
- Location within France Location within Auvergne-Rhône-Alpes
- Coordinates: 44°56′03″N 4°29′16″E
- Country: France
- Region: Auvergne-Rhône-Alpes
- Department: Ardèche
- Arrondissement: Tournon-sur-Rhône
- Canton: Haut-Eyrieux
- Commune: Belsentes
- Area^{1}: 9.34 km^{2} (3.61 sq mi)
- Elevation: 650 m (2,130 ft)
- Highest elevation: 1,060 m (3,480 ft)
- Lowest elevation: 379 m (1,243 ft)
- Population (2023): 210
  - Density: 22/km^{2} (58/sq mi)
- Time zone: UTC+01:00 (CET)
  - Summer (DST): UTC+02:00 (CEST)
- Postal code: 07160
- ^{1} French Land Register data, which excludes lakes, ponds, glaciers > 1 km^{2} (0.386 sq mi or 247 acres) and river estuaries.

Nonières (French pronunciation: [nɔnjɛʁ]; Occitan: Noniera) is a former commune in the Ardèche department in southern France. On 1 January 2019, it was merged into the new commune Belsentes.

== See also ==
- Communes of the Ardèche department
