= Saint-Julien-Boutières =

- Part of Saint-Julien-d'Intres
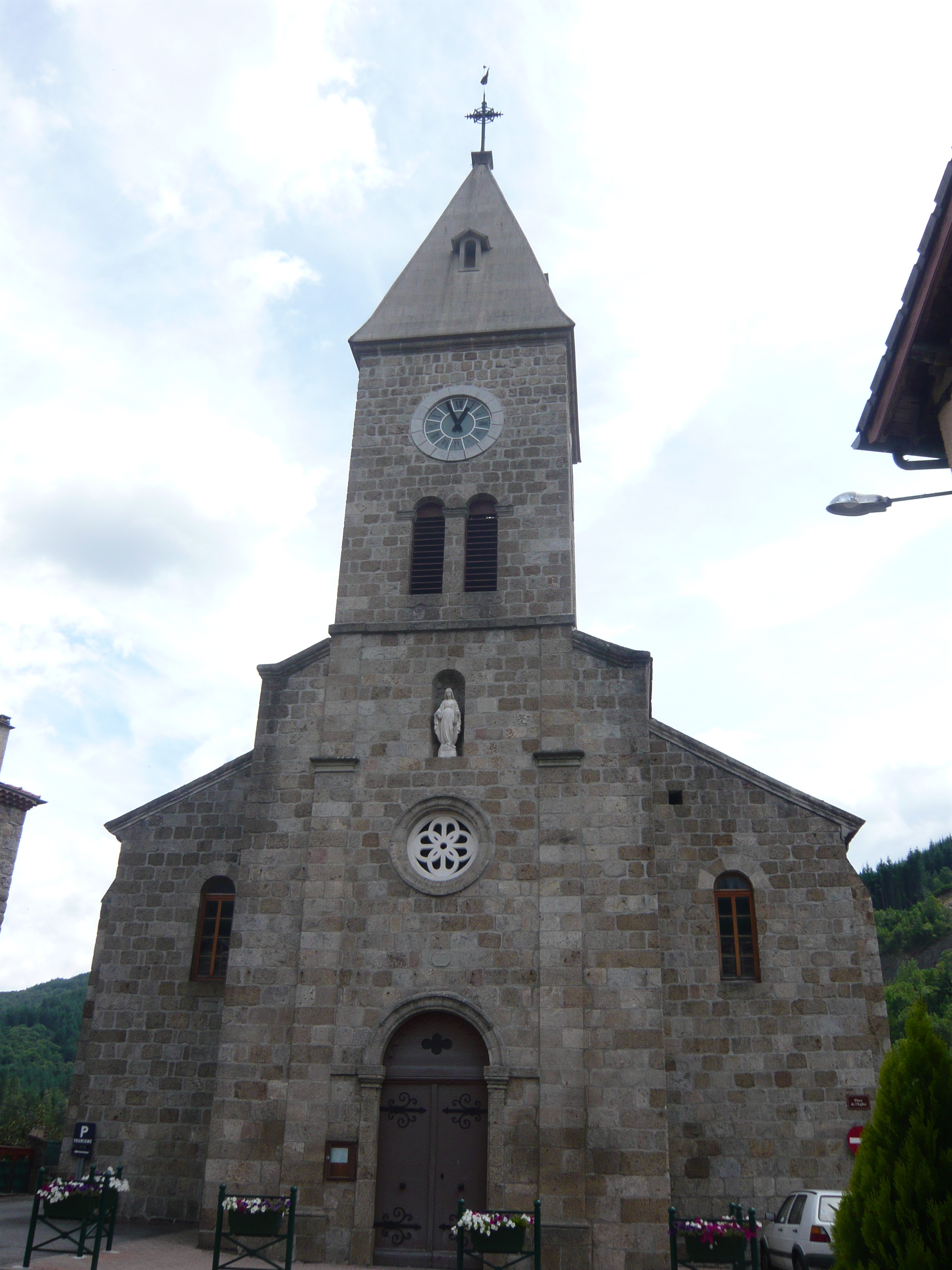
- The church in Saint-Julien-Boutières
- Location of Saint-Julien-Boutières
- Location within France Location within Auvergne-Rhône-Alpes
- Coordinates: 44°58′30″N 4°21′10″E
- Country: France
- Region: Auvergne-Rhône-Alpes
- Department: Ardèche
- Arrondissement: Tournon-sur-Rhône
- Canton: Haut-Eyrieux
- Commune: Saint-Julien-d'Intres
- Area^{1}: 11.12 km^{2} (4.29 sq mi)
- Elevation: 682 m (2,238 ft)
- Highest elevation: 1,083 m (3,553 ft)
- Lowest elevation: 574 m (1,883 ft)
- Population (2016): 186
  - Density: 16.7/km^{2} (43.3/sq mi)
- Time zone: UTC+01:00 (CET)
  - Summer (DST): UTC+02:00 (CEST)
- Postal code: 07310
- ^{1} French Land Register data, which excludes lakes, ponds, glaciers > 1 km^{2} (0.386 sq mi or 247 acres) and river estuaries.

Saint-Julien-Boutières (French pronunciation: [sɛ̃ ʒyljɛ̃ butjɛʁ]; Vivaro-Alpine: Sant Julian de Botèiras) is a former commune in the Ardèche department in southern France. On 1 January 2019, it was merged into the new commune of Saint-Julien-d'Intres.

== See also ==
- Communes of the Ardèche department
