= Vendeuvre-du-Poitou =

- Part of Saint-Martin-la-Pallu
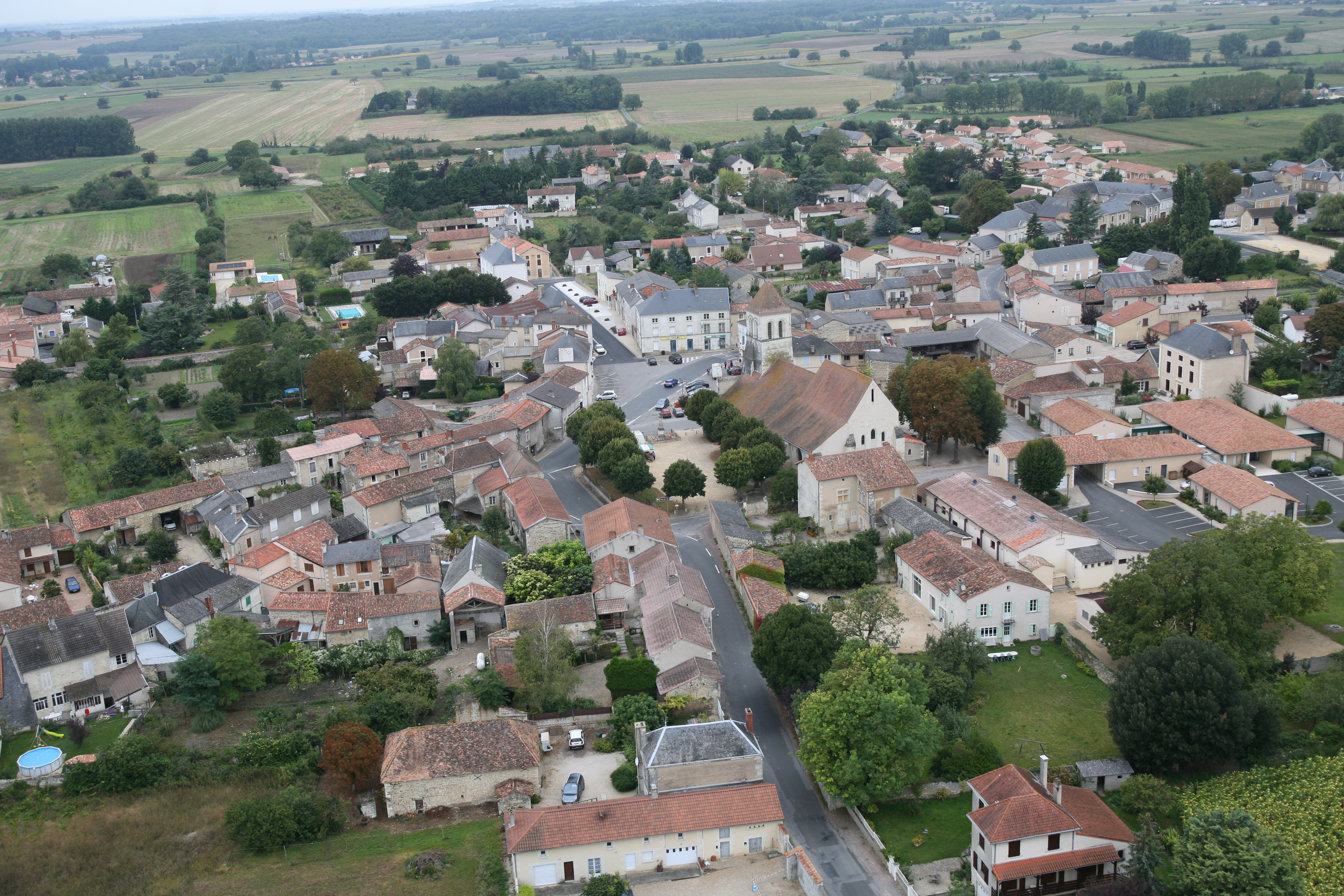
- An aerial view of Vendeuvre-du-Poitou
- Location of Vendeuvre-du-Poitou
- Location within France Location within Nouvelle-Aquitaine
- Coordinates: 46°44′11″N 0°18′37″E
- Country: France
- Region: Nouvelle-Aquitaine
- Department: Vienne
- Arrondissement: Poitiers
- Canton: Jaunay-Clan
- Commune: Saint-Martin-la-Pallu
- Area^{1}: 41.62 km^{2} (16.07 sq mi)
- Elevation: 100 m (330 ft)
- Highest elevation: 158 m (518 ft)
- Lowest elevation: 69 m (226 ft)
- Population (2022): 3,272
  - Density: 78.62/km^{2} (203.6/sq mi)
- Time zone: UTC+01:00 (CET)
  - Summer (DST): UTC+02:00 (CEST)
- Postal code: 86380
- ^{1} French Land Register data, which excludes lakes, ponds, glaciers > 1 km^{2} (0.386 sq mi or 247 acres) and river estuaries.

Vendeuvre-du-Poitou (French pronunciation: [vɑ̃dœvʁ dy pwatu], literally Vendeuvre of the Poitou) is a former commune in the Vienne department in the Nouvelle-Aquitaine region in western France. On 1 January 2017, it was merged into the new commune Saint-Martin-la-Pallu.

== See also ==
- Communes of the Vienne department
