= Saint-Champ =

Part of Magnieu in Auvergne-Rhône-Alpes, France

- Part of Magnieu
- Location of Saint-Champ
- Location within France Location within Auvergne-Rhône-Alpes
- Coordinates: 45°47′00″N 5°44′00″E
- Country: France
- Region: Auvergne-Rhône-Alpes
- Department: Ain
- Arrondissement: Belley
- Canton: Belley
- Commune: Magnieu
- Area^{1}: 5.14 km^{2} (1.98 sq mi)
- Elevation: 351 m (1,152 ft)
- Highest elevation: 554 m (1,818 ft)
- Lowest elevation: 286 m (938 ft)
- Population (2018): 147
  - Density: 28.6/km^{2} (74.1/sq mi)
- Time zone: UTC+01:00 (CET)
  - Summer (DST): UTC+02:00 (CEST)
- Postal code: 01300
- ^{1} French Land Register data, which excludes lakes, ponds, glaciers > 1 km^{2} (0.386 sq mi or 247 acres) and river estuaries.

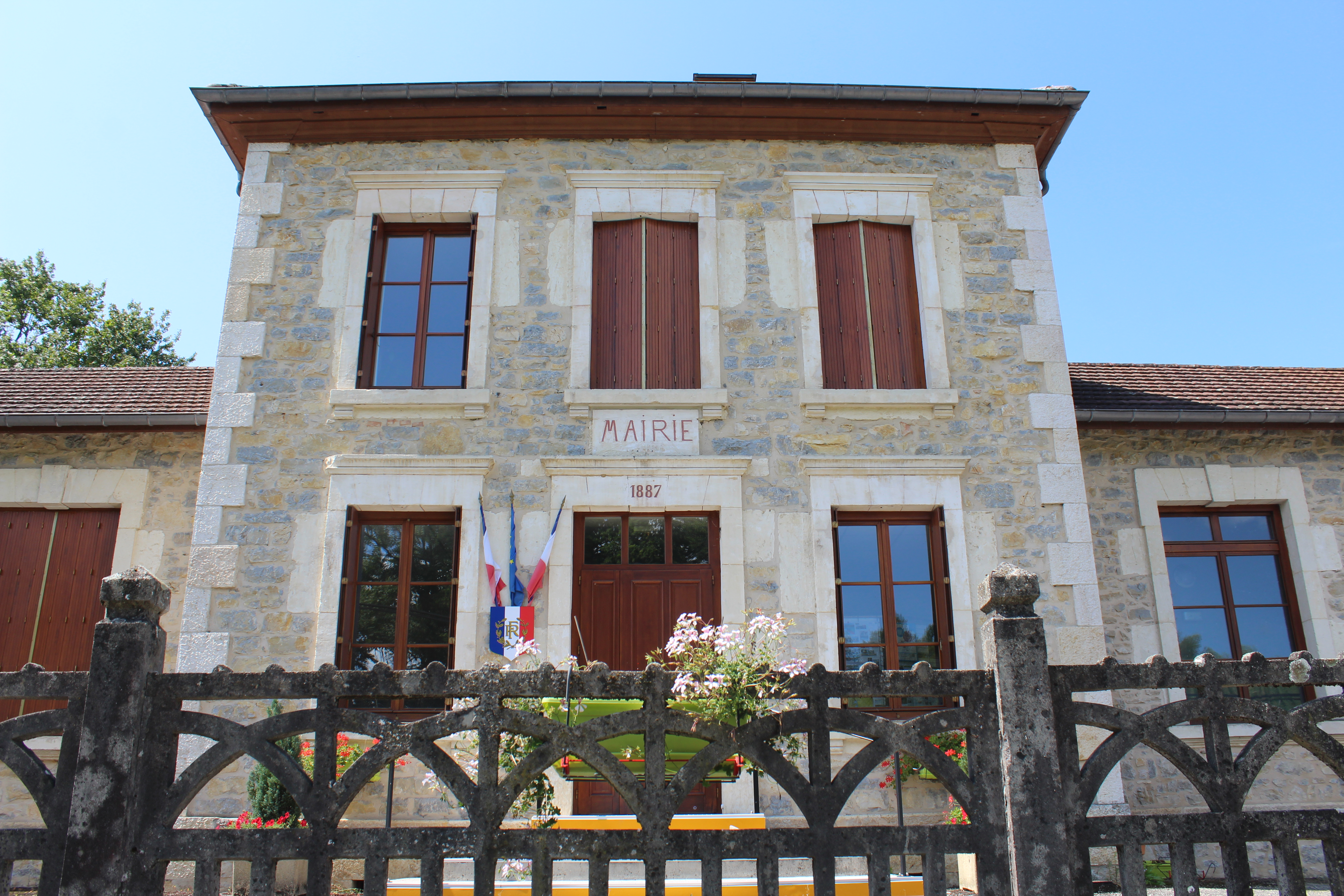
Mairie St Champ Chatonod

Saint-Champ (French pronunciation: [sɛ̃ ʃɑ̃]) is a former commune in the Ain department in eastern France. On 1 January 2019, it was merged into the commune of Magnieu.

== Population ==
Historical population
Year	Pop.	±% p.a.
2006	137	—
2011	144	+1.00%
2015	162	+2.99%
2018	147	−3.19%
Source: INSEE

== See also ==
- Communes of the Ain department
