= Vignes, Yonne =

Vignes
- Part of Guillon-Terre-Plaine
- Location of Vignes
- Location within France Location within Bourgogne-Franche-Comté
- Coordinates: 47°31′28″N 4°07′07″E
- Country: France
- Region: Bourgogne-Franche-Comté
- Department: Yonne
- Arrondissement: Avallon
- Canton: Chablis
- Commune: Guillon-Terre-Plaine
- Area^{1}: 11.77 km^{2} (4.54 sq mi)
- Highest elevation: 311 m (1,020 ft)
- Lowest elevation: 215 m (705 ft)
- Population (2022): 70
  - Density: 5.9/km^{2} (15/sq mi)
- Time zone: UTC+01:00 (CET)
  - Summer (DST): UTC+02:00 (CEST)
- Postal code: 89420
- ^{1} French Land Register data, which excludes lakes, ponds, glaciers > 1 km^{2} (0.386 sq mi or 247 acres) and river estuaries.

Vignes (French pronunciation: [viɲ]) is a former commune in the Yonne department in Bourgogne-Franche-Comté in north-central France. On 1 January 2019, it was merged into the new commune Guillon-Terre-Plaine.

== See also ==
- Communes of the Yonne department
