= Blaslay =

- Part of Saint-Martin-la-Pallu
- Location of Blaslay
- Location within France Location within Nouvelle-Aquitaine
- Coordinates: 46°44′12″N 0°14′44″E
- Country: France
- Region: Nouvelle-Aquitaine
- Department: Vienne
- Arrondissement: Poitiers
- Canton: Migné-Auxances
- Commune: Saint-Martin-la-Pallu
- Area^{1}: 19.67 km^{2} (7.59 sq mi)
- Elevation: 91 m (299 ft)
- Highest elevation: 127 m (417 ft)
- Lowest elevation: 81 m (266 ft)
- Population (2022): 539
  - Density: 27.4/km^{2} (71.0/sq mi)
- Time zone: UTC+01:00 (CET)
  - Summer (DST): UTC+02:00 (CEST)
- Postal code: 86170
- ^{1} French Land Register data, which excludes lakes, ponds, glaciers > 1 km^{2} (0.386 sq mi or 247 acres) and river estuaries.

Blaslay (French pronunciation: [blalɛ]) is a former commune in the Vienne department in the Nouvelle-Aquitaine region in western France. On 1 January 2017, it was merged into the new commune Saint-Martin-la-Pallu.

== See also ==
- Communes of the Vienne department
