= Cessières =

Commune in Aisne, France

- Part of Cessières-Suzy
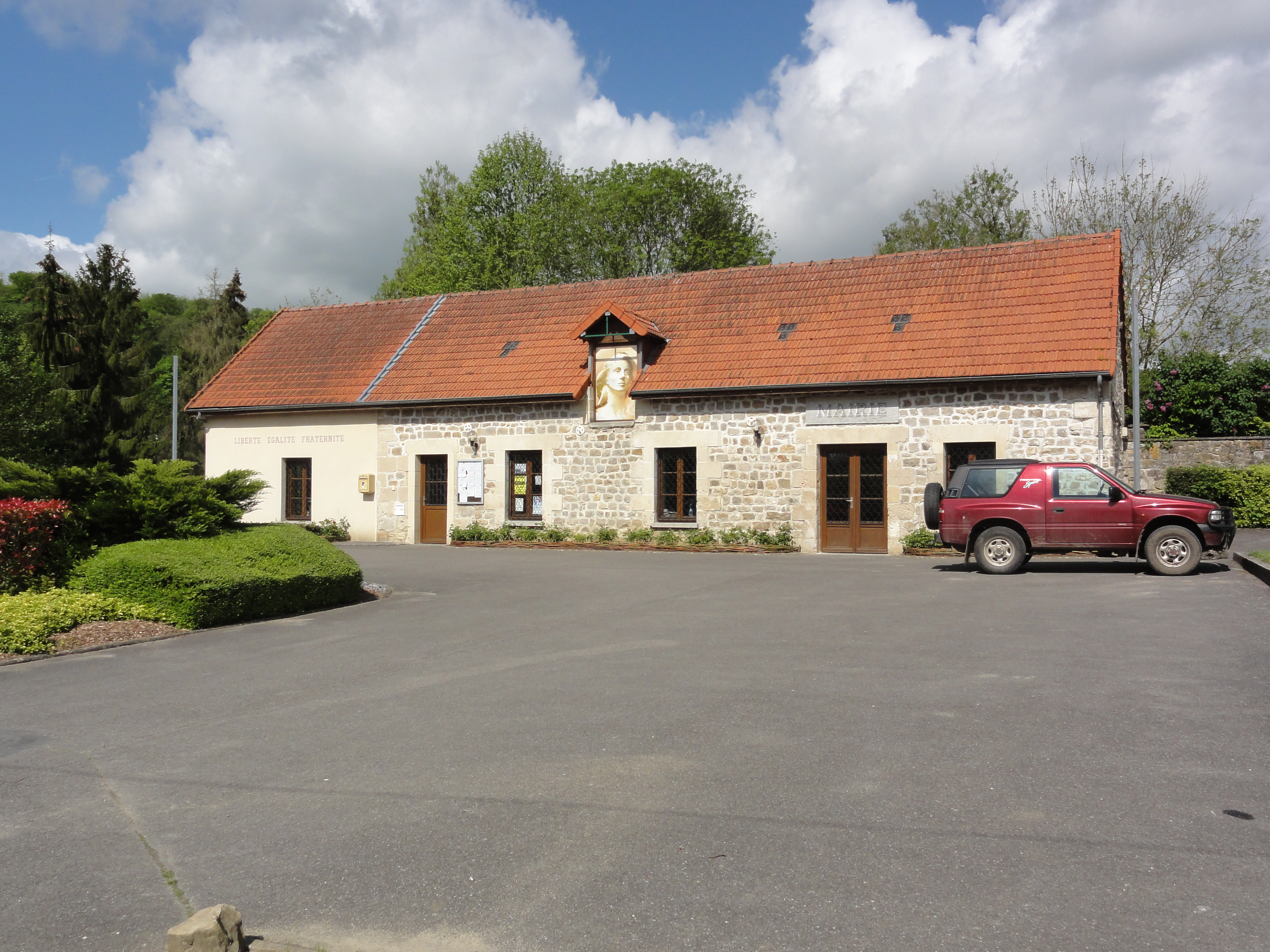
- The town hall of Cessières
- Location of Cessières
- Location within France Location within Hauts-de-France
- Coordinates: 49°33′33″N 3°29′50″E
- Country: France
- Region: Hauts-de-France
- Department: Aisne
- Arrondissement: Laon
- Canton: Laon-1
- Commune: Cessières-Suzy
- Area^{1}: 10.35 km^{2} (4.00 sq mi)
- Elevation: 132 m (433 ft)
- Highest elevation: 188 m (617 ft)
- Lowest elevation: 67 m (220 ft)
- Population (2021): 474
  - Density: 45.8/km^{2} (119/sq mi)
- Time zone: UTC+01:00 (CET)
  - Summer (DST): UTC+02:00 (CEST)
- Postal code: 02320
- ^{1} French Land Register data, which excludes lakes, ponds, glaciers > 1 km^{2} (0.386 sq mi or 247 acres) and river estuaries.

Cessières (French pronunciation: [sɛsjɛʁ]) is a former commune in the Aisne department in Hauts-de-France in northern France. On 1 January 2019, it was merged into the new commune Cessières-Suzy.

== See also ==
- Communes of the Aisne department
