= Intres, Ardèche =

Intres
- Part of Saint-Julien-d'Intres
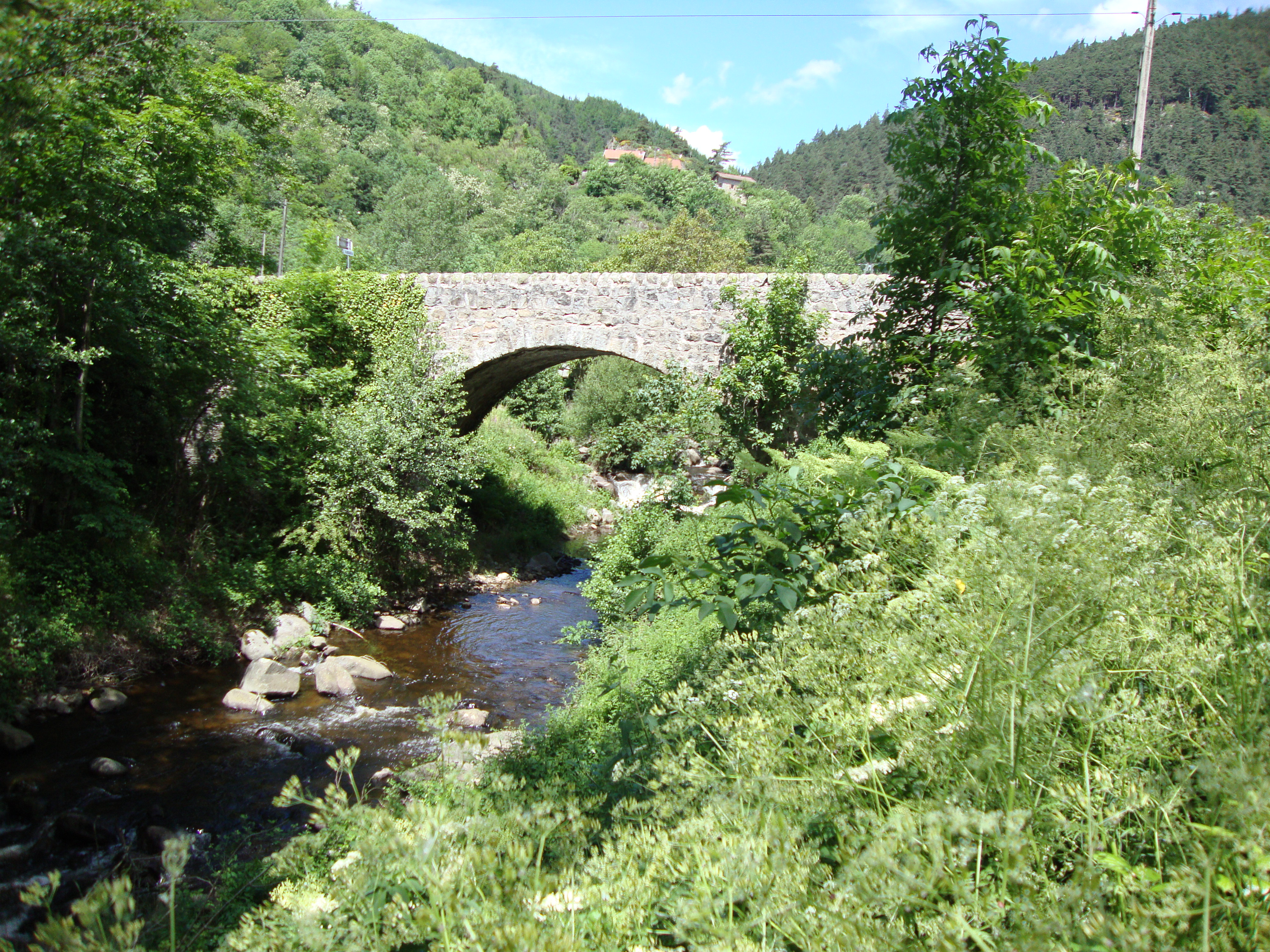
- Bridge over the Eyrieux
- Location of Intres
- Location within France Location within Auvergne-Rhône-Alpes
- Coordinates: 44°59′01″N 4°21′48″E
- Country: France
- Region: Auvergne-Rhône-Alpes
- Department: Ardèche
- Arrondissement: Tournon-sur-Rhône
- Canton: Haut-Eyrieux
- Commune: Saint-Julien-d'Intres
- Area^{1}: 10.05 km^{2} (3.88 sq mi)
- Elevation: 700 m (2,300 ft)
- Highest elevation: 1,093 m (3,586 ft)
- Lowest elevation: 649 m (2,129 ft)
- Population (2016): 157
  - Density: 15.6/km^{2} (40.5/sq mi)
- Time zone: UTC+01:00 (CET)
  - Summer (DST): UTC+02:00 (CEST)
- Postal code: 07320
- ^{1} French Land Register data, which excludes lakes, ponds, glaciers > 1 km^{2} (0.386 sq mi or 247 acres) and river estuaries.

Intres (French pronunciation: [ɛ̃tʁ]) is a former commune in the Ardèche department in southern France. On 1 January 2019, it was merged into the new commune of Saint-Julien-d'Intres.

== See also ==
- Communes of the Ardèche department
