= Saint-Julien-Labrousse =

- Part of Belsentes
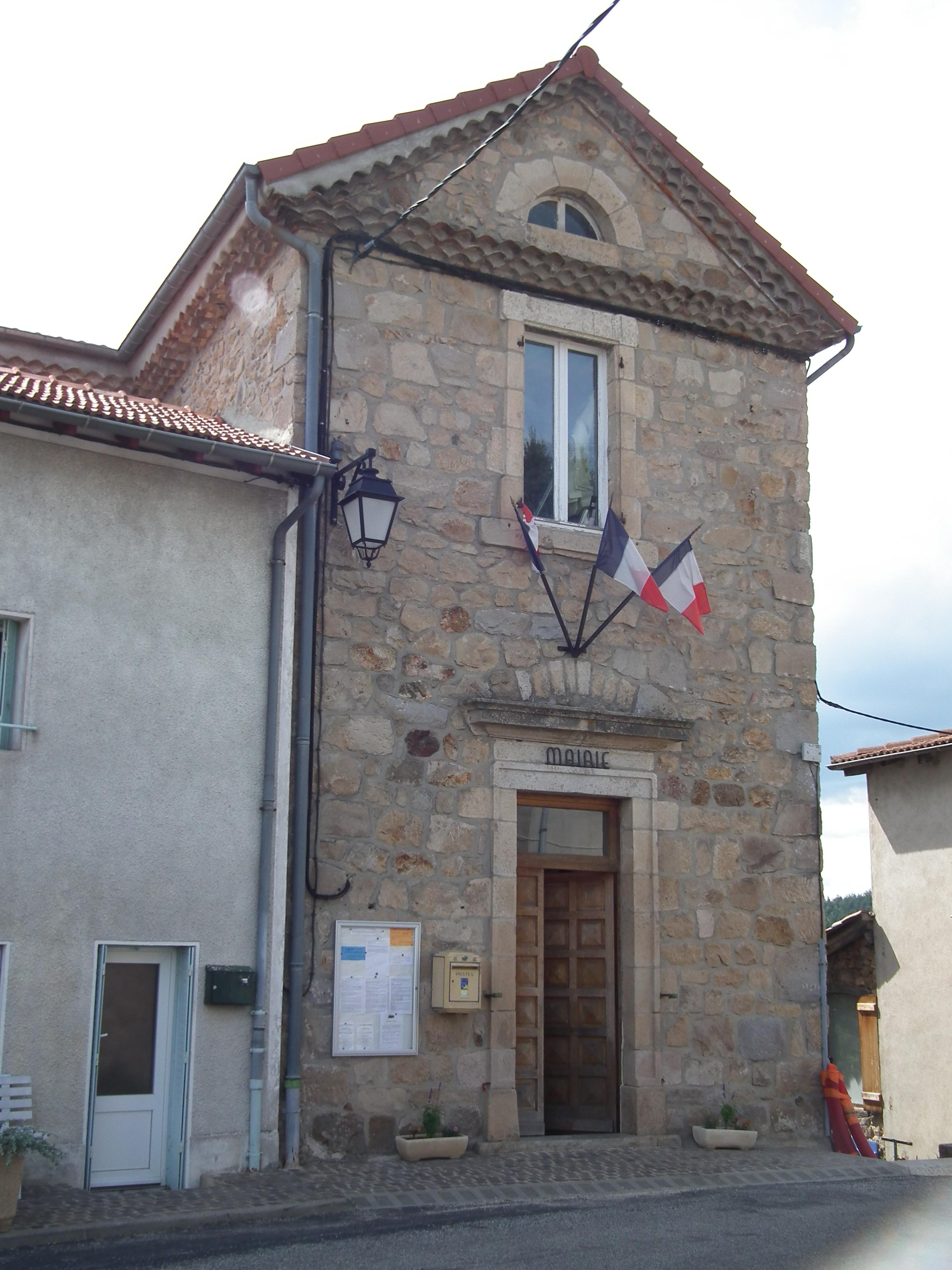
- Town hall
- Location of Saint-Julien-Labrousse
- Location within France Location within Auvergne-Rhône-Alpes
- Coordinates: 44°55′09″N 4°30′33″E
- Country: France
- Region: Auvergne-Rhône-Alpes
- Department: Ardèche
- Arrondissement: Tournon-sur-Rhône
- Canton: Haut-Eyrieux
- Commune: Belsentes
- Area^{1}: 16.47 km^{2} (6.36 sq mi)
- Elevation: 763 m (2,503 ft)
- Highest elevation: 899 m (2,949 ft)
- Lowest elevation: 315 m (1,033 ft)
- Population (2023): 328
  - Density: 19.9/km^{2} (51.6/sq mi)
- Time zone: UTC+01:00 (CET)
  - Summer (DST): UTC+02:00 (CEST)
- Postal code: 07160
- ^{1} French Land Register data, which excludes lakes, ponds, glaciers > 1 km^{2} (0.386 sq mi or 247 acres) and river estuaries.

Saint-Julien-Labrousse (Vivaro-Alpine: Sant Julian de la Brossa) is a former commune in the Ardèche department in southern France. On 1 January 2019, it was merged into the new commune Belsentes.

== See also ==
- Communes of the Ardèche department
