= Suzy, Aisne =

Suzy
- Part of Cessières-Suzy
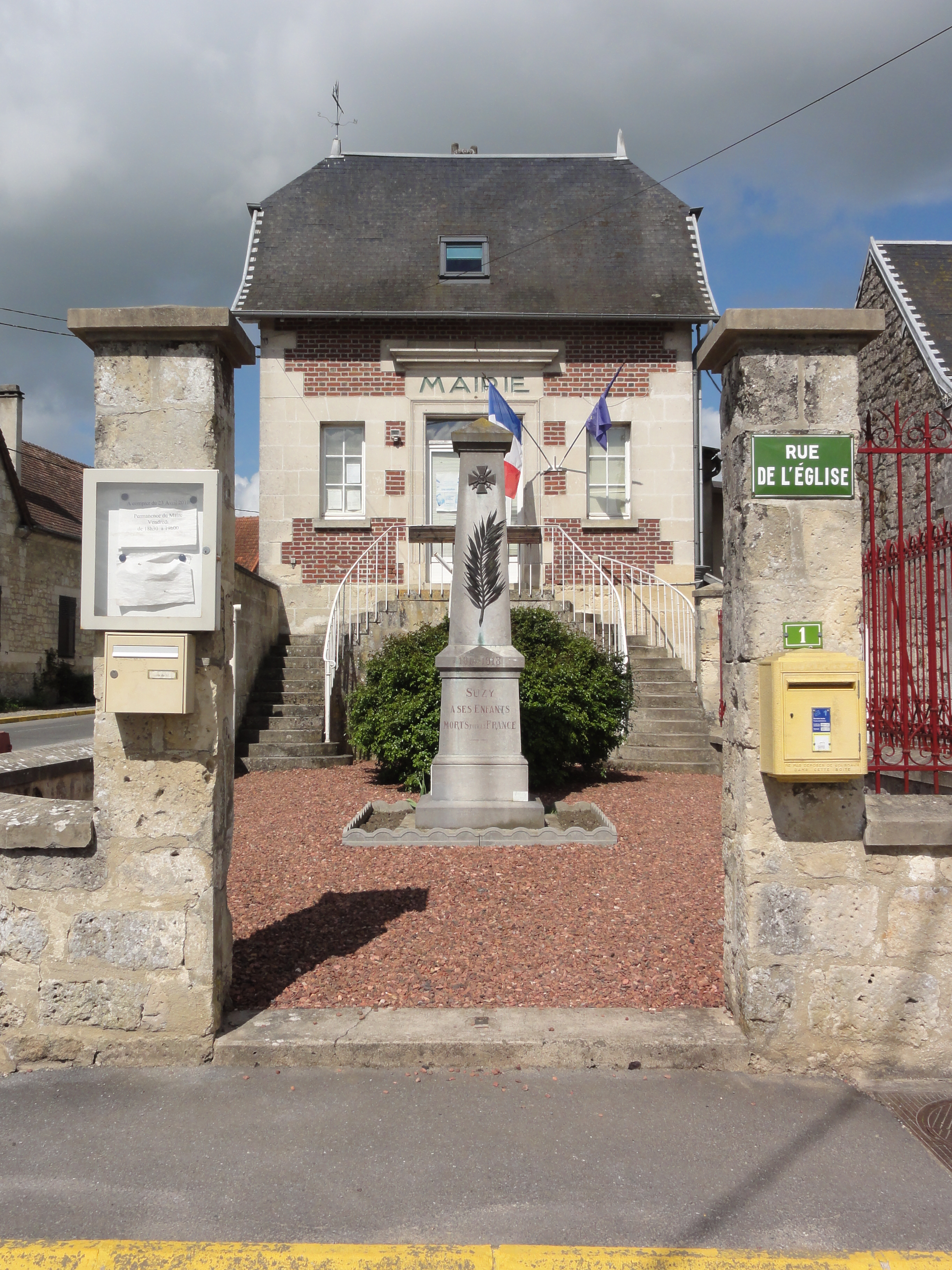
- The town hall and monument to the dead of Suzy

- Coat of arms
- Location of Suzy
- Location within France Location within Hauts-de-France
- Coordinates: 49°33′04″N 3°28′06″E
- Country: France
- Region: Hauts-de-France
- Department: Aisne
- Arrondissement: Laon
- Canton: Laon-1
- Commune: Cessières-Suzy
- Area^{1}: 9.86 km^{2} (3.81 sq mi)
- Elevation: 120 m (390 ft)
- Highest elevation: 207 m (679 ft)
- Lowest elevation: 71 m (233 ft)
- Population (2021): 311
  - Density: 31.5/km^{2} (81.7/sq mi)
- Time zone: UTC+01:00 (CET)
  - Summer (DST): UTC+02:00 (CEST)
- Postal code: 02320
- ^{1} French Land Register data, which excludes lakes, ponds, glaciers > 1 km^{2} (0.386 sq mi or 247 acres) and river estuaries.

Suzy (French pronunciation: [syzi]) is a former commune in the Aisne department in Hauts-de-France in northern France. On 1 January 2019, it was merged into the new commune Cessières-Suzy.

== See also ==
- Communes of the Aisne department
