= Magnieu =

Commune in Auvergne-Rhône-Alpes, France

- Commune
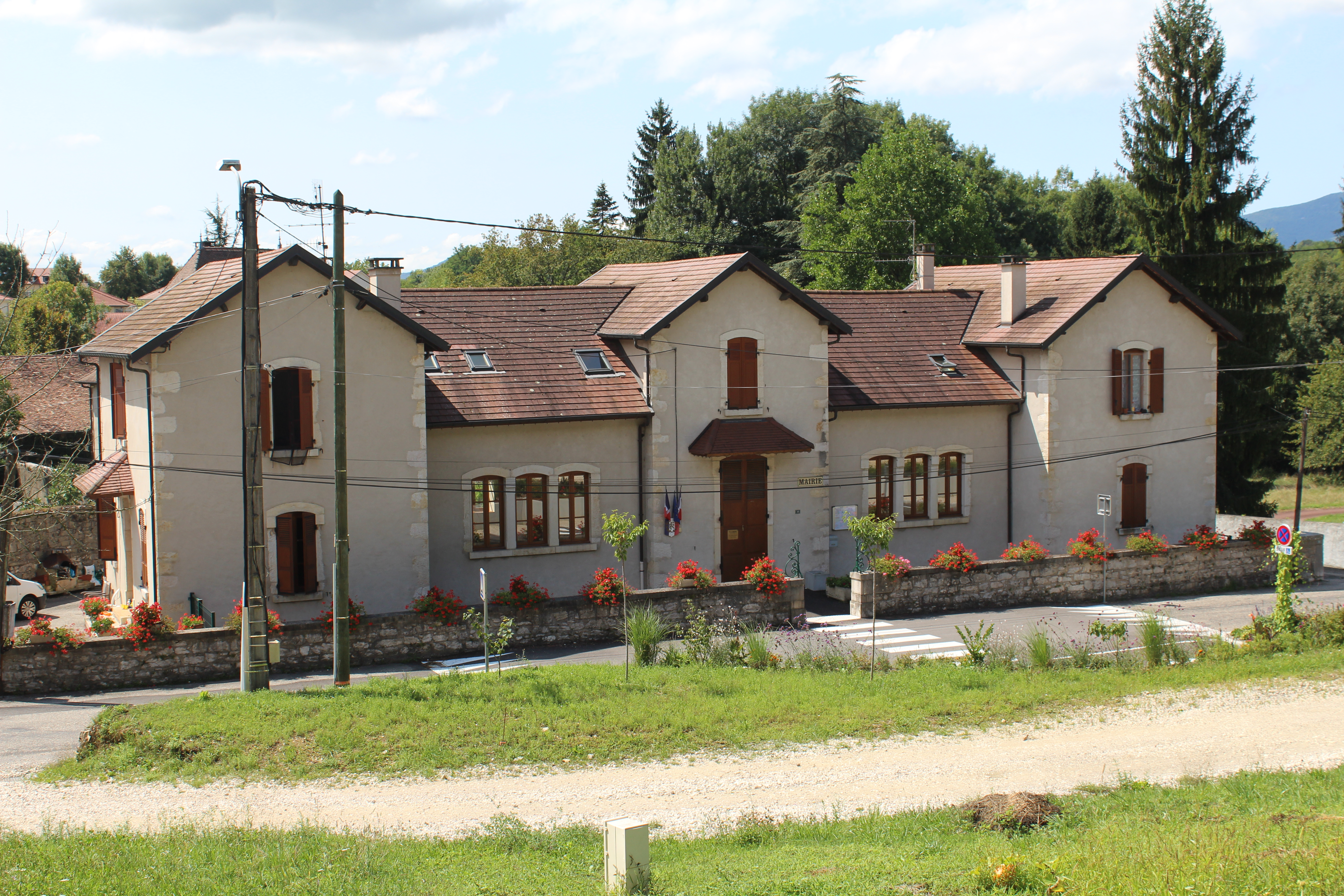
- Town hall
- Location of Magnieu
- Location within France Location within Auvergne-Rhône-Alpes
- Coordinates: 45°47′00″N 5°43′00″E
- Country: France
- Region: Auvergne-Rhône-Alpes
- Department: Ain
- Arrondissement: Belley
- Canton: Belley
- Intercommunality: Bugey Sud

Government
  - Mayor (2026–32): René Bernard
- Area^{1}: 11.37 km^{2} (4.39 sq mi)
- Elevation: 310 m (1,020 ft)
- Highest elevation: 460 m (1,510 ft)
- Lowest elevation: 227 m (745 ft)
- Population (2023): 651
  - Density: 57.3/km^{2} (148/sq mi)
- Time zone: UTC+01:00 (CET)
  - Summer (DST): UTC+02:00 (CEST)
- INSEE/Postal code: 01227 /01300
- ^{1} French Land Register data, which excludes lakes, ponds, glaciers > 1 km^{2} (0.386 sq mi or 247 acres) and river estuaries.

Magnieu (French pronunciation: [maɲø]) is a commune in the Ain department in eastern France. On 1 January 2019, the former commune of Saint-Champ was merged into Magnieu.

== Population ==
Historical population
Year	Pop.	±% p.a.
1968	380	—
1975	366	−0.53%
1982	413	+1.74%
1990	433	+0.59%
1999	423	−0.26%
2007	554	+3.43%
2012	578	+0.85%
2017	644	+2.19%
2023	651	+0.18%
Populations of the area corresponding with the commune of Magnieu at 1 January 2025. Source: INSEE

== See also ==
- Communes of the Ain department
