= Trévilly =

- Part of Guillon-Terre-Plaine
- Location of Trévilly
- Location within France Location within Bourgogne-Franche-Comté
- Coordinates: 47°31′49″N 4°03′36″E
- Country: France
- Region: Bourgogne-Franche-Comté
- Department: Yonne
- Arrondissement: Avallon
- Canton: Chablis
- Commune: Guillon-Terre-Plaine
- Area^{1}: 6.86 km^{2} (2.65 sq mi)
- Highest elevation: 275 m (902 ft)
- Lowest elevation: 202 m (663 ft)
- Population (2022): 56
  - Density: 8.2/km^{2} (21/sq mi)
- Time zone: UTC+01:00 (CET)
  - Summer (DST): UTC+02:00 (CEST)
- Postal code: 89420
- ^{1} French Land Register data, which excludes lakes, ponds, glaciers > 1 km^{2} (0.386 sq mi or 247 acres) and river estuaries.

Trévilly (French pronunciation: [tʁeviji]) is a former commune in the Yonne department in Bourgogne-Franche-Comté in north-central France. On 1 January 2019, it was merged into the new commune Guillon-Terre-Plaine.

== See also ==
- Communes of the Yonne department
