= Cheneché =

Former commune in Nouvelle-Aquitaine, France

- Part of Saint-Martin-la-Pallu
- Location of Cheneché
- Location within France Location within Nouvelle-Aquitaine
- Coordinates: 46°44′18″N 0°16′53″E
- Country: France
- Region: Nouvelle-Aquitaine
- Department: Vienne
- Arrondissement: Poitiers
- Canton: Migné-Auxances
- Commune: Saint-Martin-la-Pallu
- Area^{1}: 5.15 km^{2} (1.99 sq mi)
- Elevation: 120 m (390 ft)
- Highest elevation: 119 m (390 ft)
- Lowest elevation: 77 m (253 ft)
- Population (2022): 386
  - Density: 75.0/km^{2} (194/sq mi)
- Time zone: UTC+01:00 (CET)
  - Summer (DST): UTC+02:00 (CEST)
- Postal code: 86380
- ^{1} French Land Register data, which excludes lakes, ponds, glaciers > 1 km^{2} (0.386 sq mi or 247 acres) and river estuaries.

Cheneché (French pronunciation: [ʃənʃe]) is a former commune in the Vienne department in the Nouvelle-Aquitaine region in western France. On 1 January 2017, it was merged into the new commune Saint-Martin-la-Pallu.

== See also ==
- Communes of the Vienne department
