= Saint-Martin-la-Pallu =

- Commune
- Location of Saint-Martin-la-Pallu
- Location within France Location within Nouvelle-Aquitaine
- Coordinates: 46°44′10″N 0°18′36″E
- Country: France
- Region: Nouvelle-Aquitaine
- Department: Vienne
- Arrondissement: Poitiers
- Canton: Jaunay-Marigny
- Intercommunality: Haut-Poitou

Government
  - Mayor (2020–2026): Valérie Chebassier
- Area^{1}: 93.87 km^{2} (36.24 sq mi)
- Highest elevation: 159 m (522 ft)
- Lowest elevation: 69 m (226 ft)
- Population (2023): 5,713
  - Density: 60.86/km^{2} (157.6/sq mi)
- Time zone: UTC+01:00 (CET)
  - Summer (DST): UTC+02:00 (CEST)
- INSEE/Postal code: 86281 /86380
- ^{1} French Land Register data, which excludes lakes, ponds, glaciers > 1 km^{2} (0.386 sq mi or 247 acres) and river estuaries.

Saint-Martin-la-Pallu (French pronunciation: [sɛ̃ maʁtɛ̃ la paly]) is a commune in the department of Vienne, western France. The municipality was established on 1 January 2017 by merger of the former communes of Vendeuvre-du-Poitou (the seat), Blaslay, Charrais and Cheneché. On 1 January 2019, the former commune of Varennes was merged into Saint-Martin-la-Pallu.

== Population ==
The population data given in the table below refer to the commune in its geography as of January 2025.

Historical population
Year	Pop.	±% p.a.
1968	3,288	—
1975	3,143	−0.64%
1982	3,586	+1.90%
1990	3,900	+1.05%
1999	4,167	+0.74%
2007	4,815	+1.82%
2012	5,418	+2.39%
2017	5,546	+0.47%
2023	5,713	+0.50%
Source: INSEE

== See also ==
- Communes of the Vienne department
