= Cessières-Suzy =

- Commune
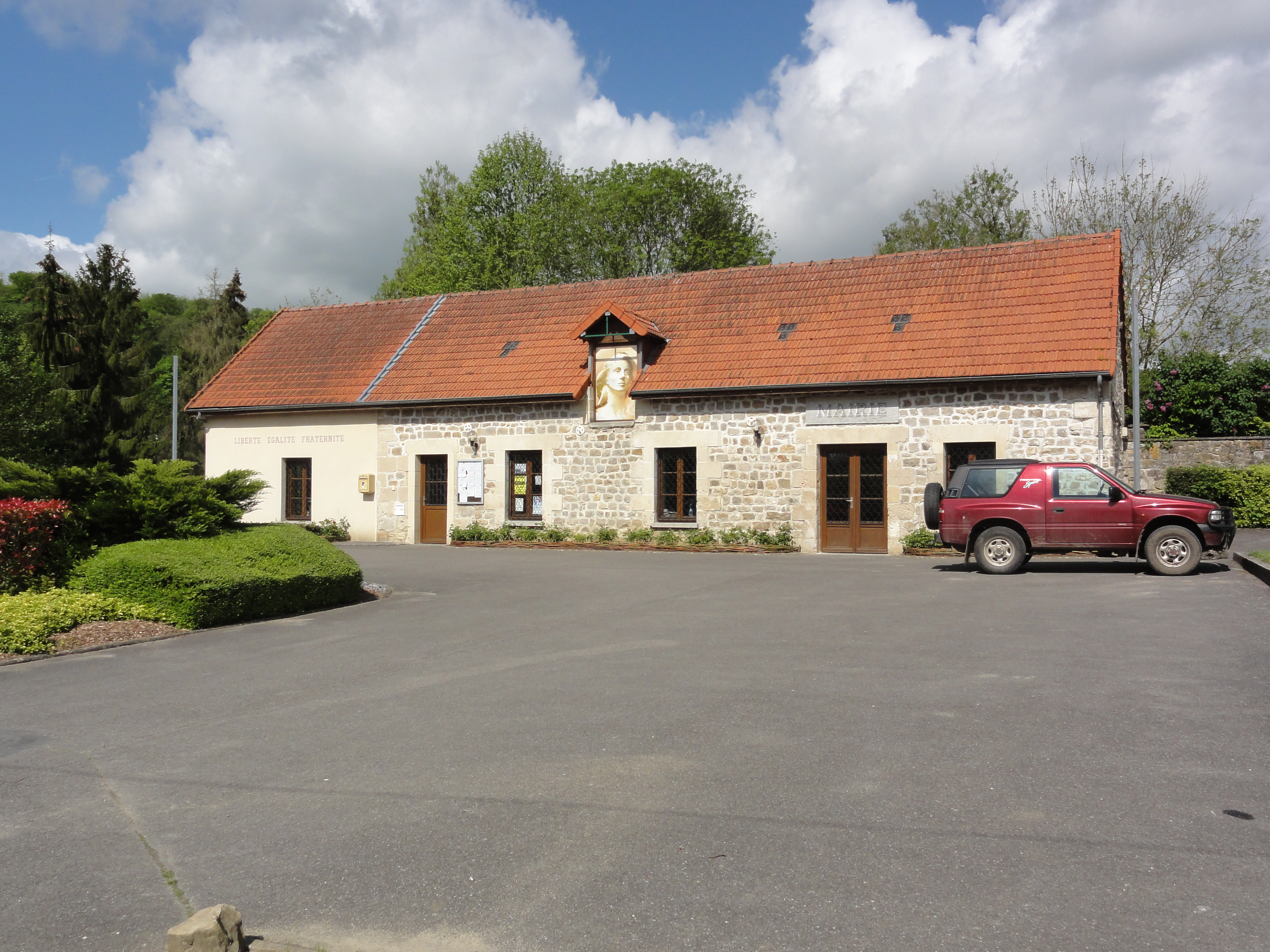
- Cessières-Suzy Town hall
- Location of Cessières-Suzy
- Location within France Location within Hauts-de-France
- Coordinates: 49°33′33″N 3°29′50″E
- Country: France
- Region: Hauts-de-France
- Department: Aisne
- Arrondissement: Laon
- Canton: Laon-1
- Intercommunality: CA Pays de Laon

Government
  - Mayor (2026–32): Pierre Berteloot
- Area^{1}: 20.21 km^{2} (7.80 sq mi)
- Highest elevation: 207 m (679 ft)
- Lowest elevation: 67 m (220 ft)
- Population (2023): 801
  - Density: 39.6/km^{2} (103/sq mi)
- Time zone: UTC+01:00 (CET)
  - Summer (DST): UTC+02:00 (CEST)
- INSEE/Postal code: 02153 /02320
- ^{1} French Land Register data, which excludes lakes, ponds, glaciers > 1 km^{2} (0.386 sq mi or 247 acres) and river estuaries.

Cessières-Suzy (French pronunciation: [sɛsjɛʁ syzi]) is a commune in the Aisne department in northern France. The municipality was established on 1 January 2019 by merger of the former communes of Cessières and Suzy.

== See also ==
- Communes of the Aisne department
