= Surjoux-Lhopital =

Commune in Auvergne-Rhône-Alpes, France

- Commune
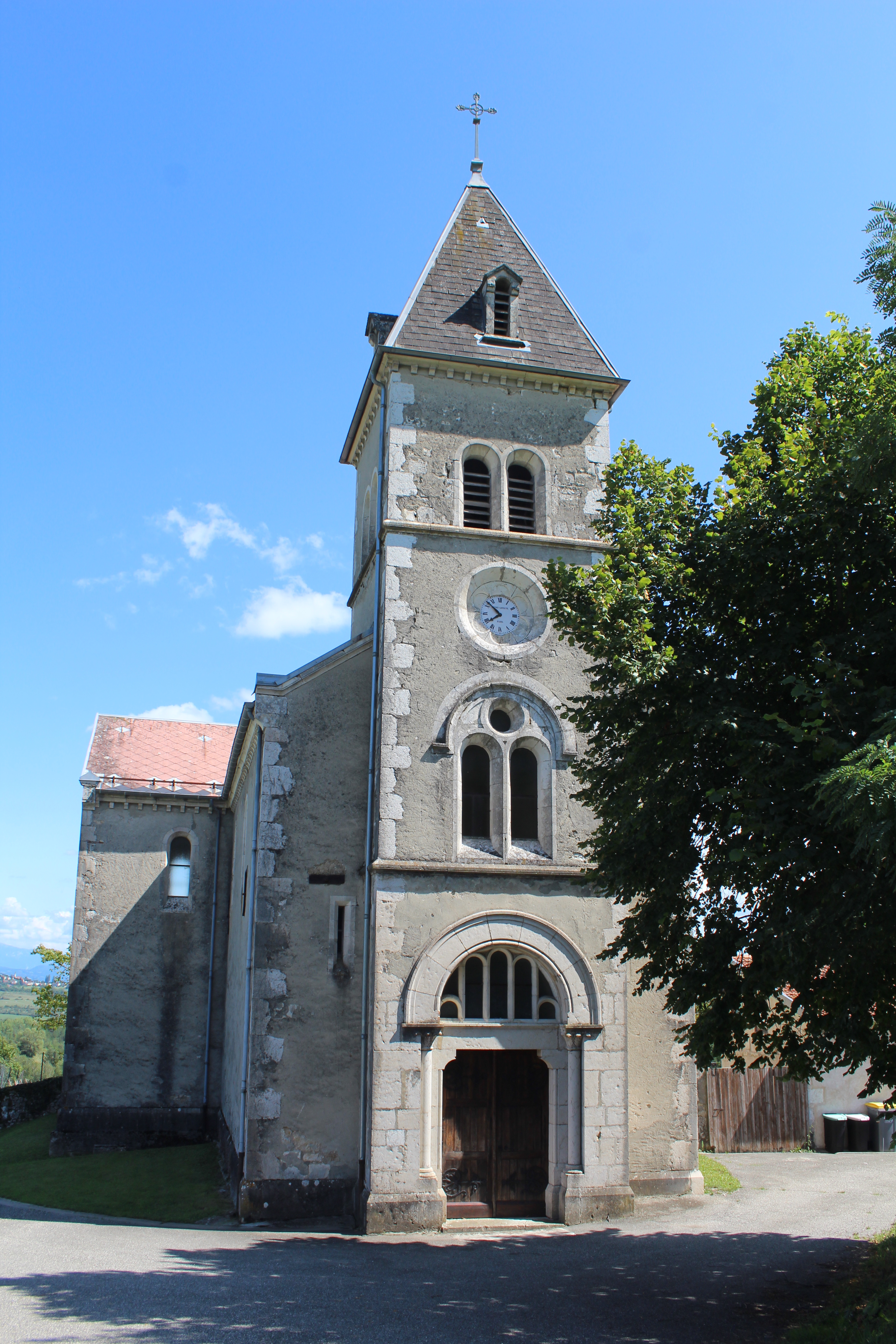
- Location of Surjoux-Lhopital
- Location within France Location within Auvergne-Rhône-Alpes
- Coordinates: 46°01′19″N 5°46′45″E
- Country: France
- Region: Auvergne-Rhône-Alpes
- Department: Ain
- Arrondissement: Nantua
- Canton: Valserhône
- Intercommunality: Terre Valserhône

Government
  - Mayor (2026–32): Bruno Consani
- Area^{1}: 7.99 km^{2} (3.08 sq mi)
- Elevation: 490 m (1,610 ft)
- Highest elevation: 1,160 m (3,810 ft)
- Lowest elevation: 300 m (980 ft)
- Population (2023): 138
  - Density: 17.3/km^{2} (44.7/sq mi)
- Time zone: UTC+01:00 (CET)
  - Summer (DST): UTC+02:00 (CEST)
- INSEE/Postal code: 01215 /01420
- ^{1} French Land Register data, which excludes lakes, ponds, glaciers > 1 km^{2} (0.386 sq mi or 247 acres) and river estuaries.

Surjoux-Lhôpital (French pronunciation: [syʁʒu lopital]) is a commune in the Ain department in eastern France. It is the result of the merger, on 1 January 2019, of the communes of Surjoux and Lhôpital.

== See also ==
- Communes of the Ain department
