= Meroux-Moval =

- Commune
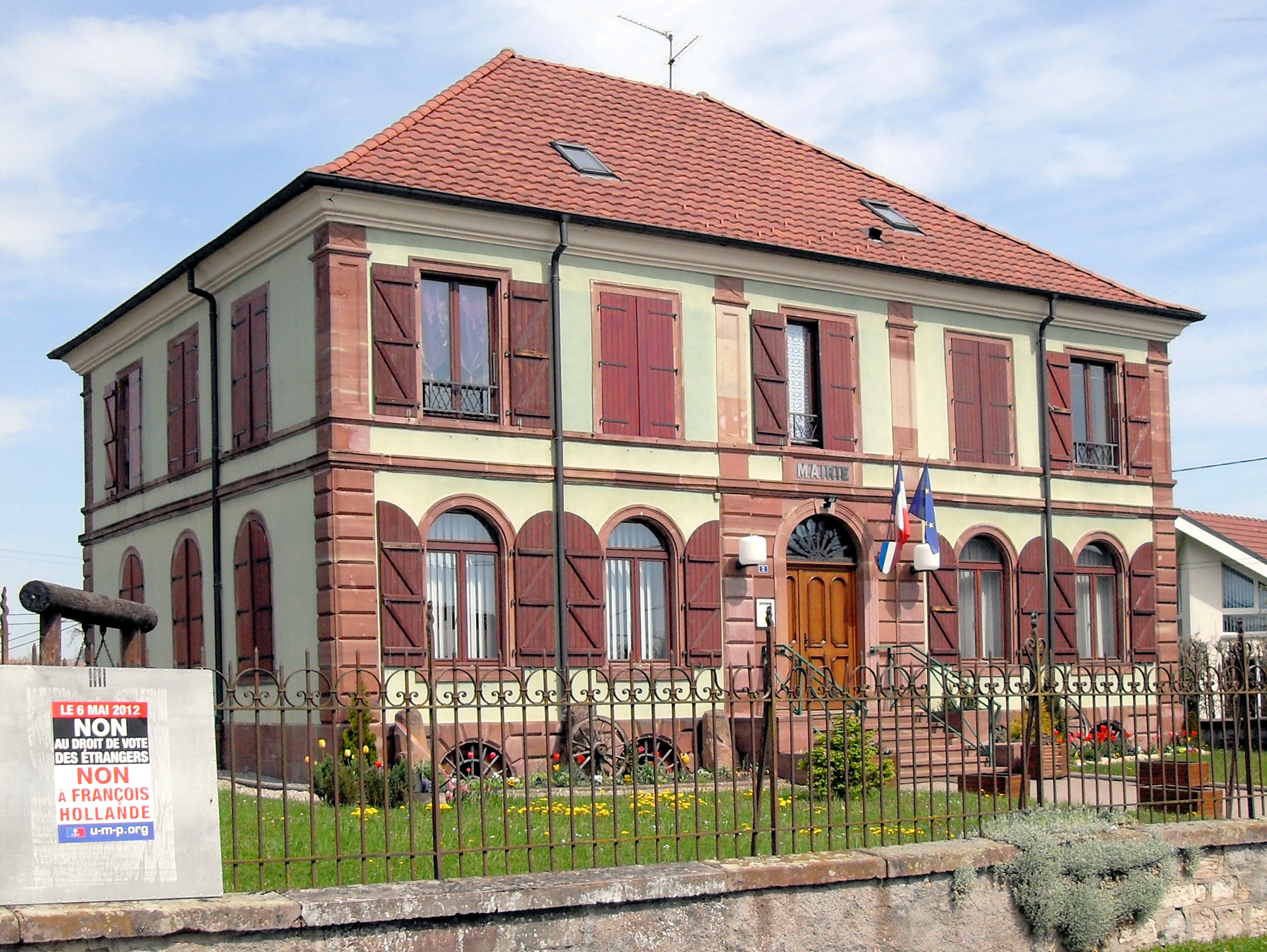
- Town hall in Meroux.

- Coat of arms
- Location of Meroux-Moval
- Location within France Location within Bourgogne-Franche-Comté
- Coordinates: 47°35′47″N 6°54′01″E
- Country: France
- Region: Bourgogne-Franche-Comté
- Department: Territoire de Belfort
- Arrondissement: Belfort
- Canton: Châtenois-les-Forges
- Intercommunality: Grand Belfort

Government
  - Mayor (2020–2026): Stéphane Guyod
- Area^{1}: 10 km^{2} (3.9 sq mi)
- Highest elevation: 406 m (1,332 ft)
- Lowest elevation: 340 m (1,120 ft)
- Population (2023): 1,440
  - Density: 140/km^{2} (370/sq mi)
- Time zone: UTC+01:00 (CET)
  - Summer (DST): UTC+02:00 (CEST)
- INSEE/Postal code: 90068 /90400
- ^{1} French Land Register data, which excludes lakes, ponds, glaciers > 1 km^{2} (0.386 sq mi or 247 acres) and river estuaries.

Meroux-Moval (French pronunciation: [meʁu mɔval], pronounced as Méroux-Moval) is a commune in the Territoire de Belfort department in Bourgogne-Franche-Comté in northeastern France. It was established on 1 January 2019 from the merging of the former communes Meroux and Moval. Belfort – Montbéliard TGV station is situated in the commune.

== History ==
On July 15, 1972, the neighboring communes of Meroux and Moval merged, forming an association that allowed for the possibility of separation at a later date. This separation took place on January 1, 1997, restoring the two communes as independent entities.

On January 1, 2019, Meroux and Moval were merged again following a prefectural decree issued on December 21, 2018.

== Population ==
Historical population
Year	Pop.	±% p.a.
1968	548	—
1975	619	+1.76%
1982	732	+2.42%
1990	893	+2.52%
1999	910	+0.21%
2007	1,102	+2.42%
2012	1,223	+2.11%
2017	1,307	+1.34%
2023	1,440	+1.63%
Populations of the area corresponding with the commune of Meroux-Moval at 1 January 2025. Source: INSEE

== See also ==
- Communes of the Territoire de Belfort department
