= Guillon, Yonne =

Guillon
- Part of Guillon-Terre-Plaine
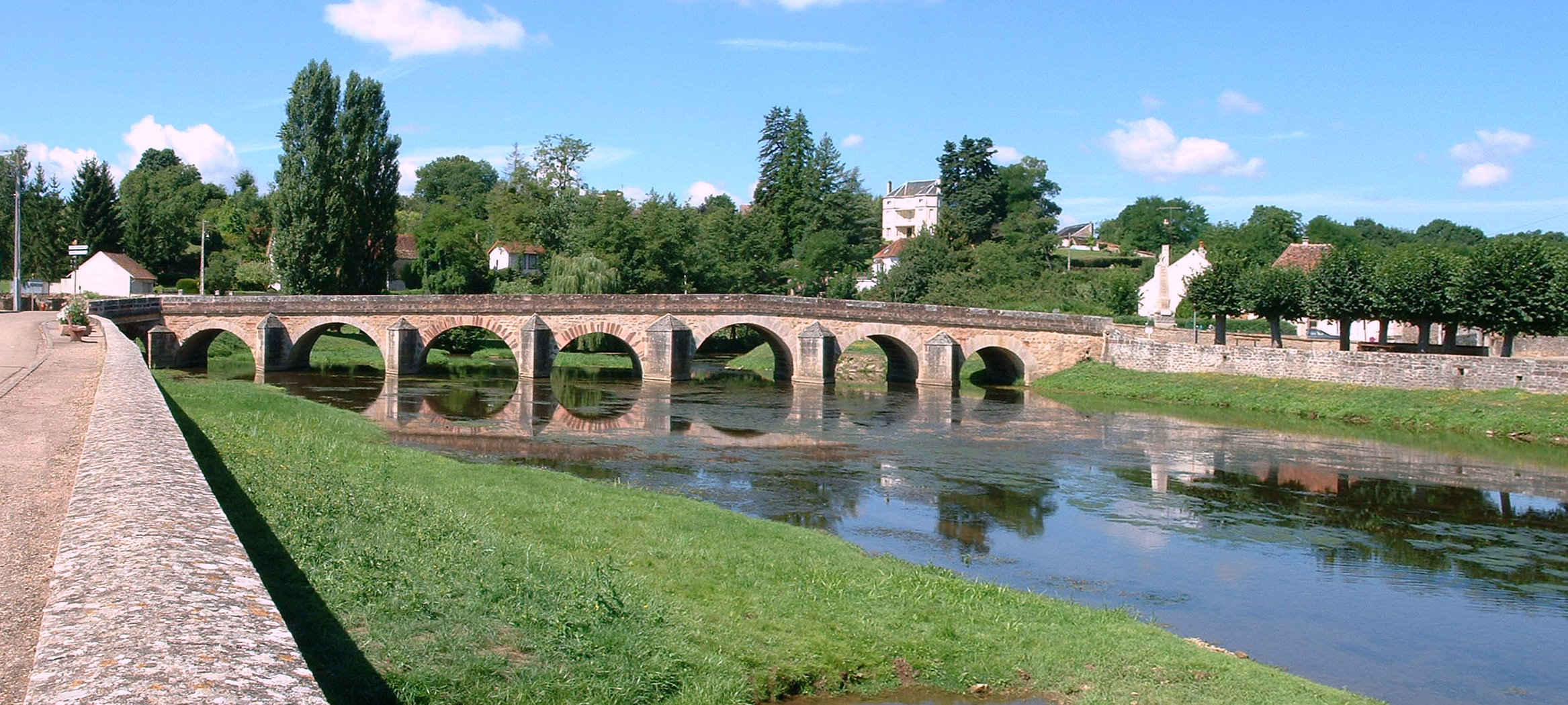
- The 16th century bridge of Guillong
- Location of Guillon
- Location within France Location within Bourgogne-Franche-Comté
- Coordinates: 47°30′54″N 4°05′38″E
- Country: France
- Region: Bourgogne-Franche-Comté
- Department: Yonne
- Arrondissement: Avallon
- Canton: Chablis
- Commune: Guillon-Terre-Plaine
- Area^{1}: 11.94 km^{2} (4.61 sq mi)
- Highest elevation: 328 m (1,076 ft)
- Lowest elevation: 203 m (666 ft)
- Population (2022): 422
  - Density: 35.3/km^{2} (91.5/sq mi)
- Time zone: UTC+01:00 (CET)
  - Summer (DST): UTC+02:00 (CEST)
- Postal code: 89420
- ^{1} French Land Register data, which excludes lakes, ponds, glaciers > 1 km^{2} (0.386 sq mi or 247 acres) and river estuaries.

Guillon (French pronunciation: [ɡɥijɔ̃]) is a former commune in the Yonne department in Bourgogne-Franche-Comté in north-central France. On 1 January 2019, it was merged into the new commune Guillon-Terre-Plaine. It is located near the Côte-d'Or and the Nièvre department.

Guillon once had a castle and a peripheral wall. The location of the castle, demolished in 1418, is no longer known.

During the Hundred Years' War, Guillon was occupied by the English army until a treaty was signed in 1360 between Burgundy and England known as the Treaty of Guillon or the Treaty of Golden Sheep. Under this three-year agreement, the Burgundians paid 200,000 gold pieces to the English. After this agreement Edward III stayed at the Chateau de Guillon. This is the sole historical reference to the castle. As soon as the political situation allowed for peace, a bridge was built in the early 15th century over the Serein to promote trade. The bridge took its current form in 1866 after a widening of the road.

== See also ==
- Communes of the Yonne department
