= Aulos-Sinsat =

Commune in Occitanie, France

- Commune
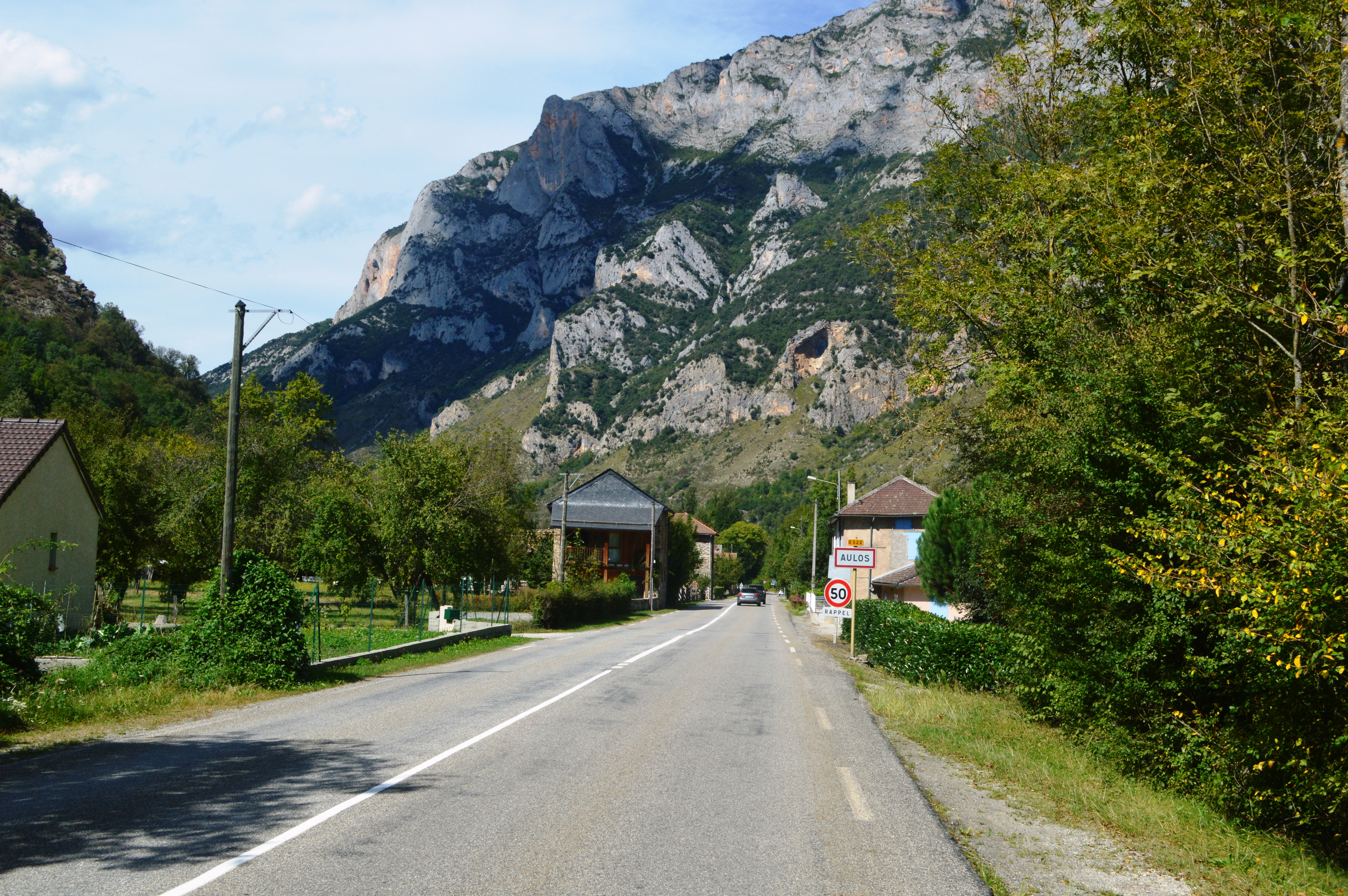
- The entry to Aulos
- Location of Aulos-Sinsat
- Location within France Location within Occitanie
- Coordinates: 42°47′59″N 1°39′47″E
- Country: France
- Region: Occitania
- Department: Ariège
- Arrondissement: Foix
- Canton: Haute-Ariège
- Intercommunality: CC Haute-Ariège

Government
  - Mayor (2020–2026): Jean Jacques Stroh
- Area^{1}: 5.05 km^{2} (1.95 sq mi)
- Elevation: 612 m (2,008 ft)
- Highest elevation: 1,481 m (4,859 ft)
- Lowest elevation: 490 m (1,610 ft)
- Population (2023): 160
  - Density: 32/km^{2} (82/sq mi)
- Time zone: UTC+01:00 (CET)
  - Summer (DST): UTC+02:00 (CEST)
- INSEE/Postal code: 09296 /09310
- ^{1} French Land Register data, which excludes lakes, ponds, glaciers > 1 km^{2} (0.386 sq mi or 247 acres) and river estuaries.

Aulos-Sinsat (Occitan: Aulòs) is a commune in the Ariège department in southwestern France. The municipality was established on 1 January 2019 by merger of the former communes of Aulos and Sinsat.
