= Surjoux =

Commune in Ain, France

Surjoux Sorjœx (Arpitan)
- Part of Surjoux-Lhopital
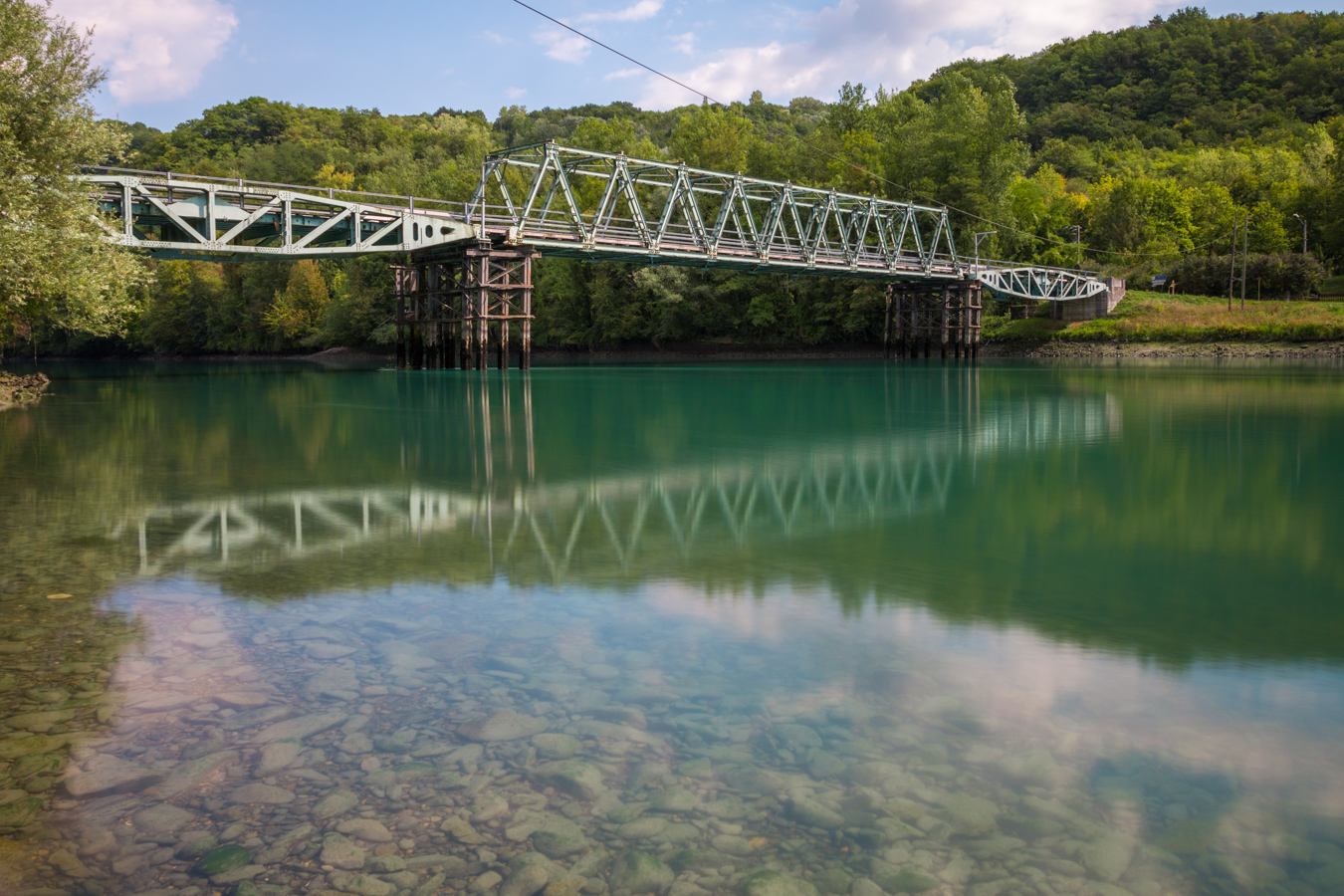
- Pont de Pyrimont de Surjoux
- Location of Surjoux
- Location within France Location within Auvergne-Rhône-Alpes
- Coordinates: 46°01′00″N 5°48′00″E
- Country: France
- Region: Auvergne-Rhône-Alpes
- Department: Ain
- Arrondissement: Nantua
- Canton: Bellegarde-sur-Valserine
- Commune: Surjoux-Lhopital
- Area^{1}: 4.31 km^{2} (1.66 sq mi)
- Highest elevation: 503 m (1,650 ft)
- Lowest elevation: 300 m (980 ft)
- Population (2022): 95
  - Density: 22/km^{2} (57/sq mi)
- Time zone: UTC+01:00 (CET)
  - Summer (DST): UTC+02:00 (CEST)
- Postal code: 01420
- ^{1} French Land Register data, which excludes lakes, ponds, glaciers > 1 km^{2} (0.386 sq mi or 247 acres) and river estuaries.

Surjoux (French pronunciation: [syʁʒu]; Arpitan: Sorjœx) is a former commune in the Ain department in eastern France. On 1 January 2019, it was merged into the new commune of Surjoux-Lhopital.

== Population ==
Historical population
Year	Pop.	±% p.a.
2006	73	—
2011	77	+1.07%
2015	72	−1.66%
2022	95	+4.04%
Source: INSEE

== See also ==
- Communes of the Ain department
