= Saint-Julien-d'Intres =

- Commune
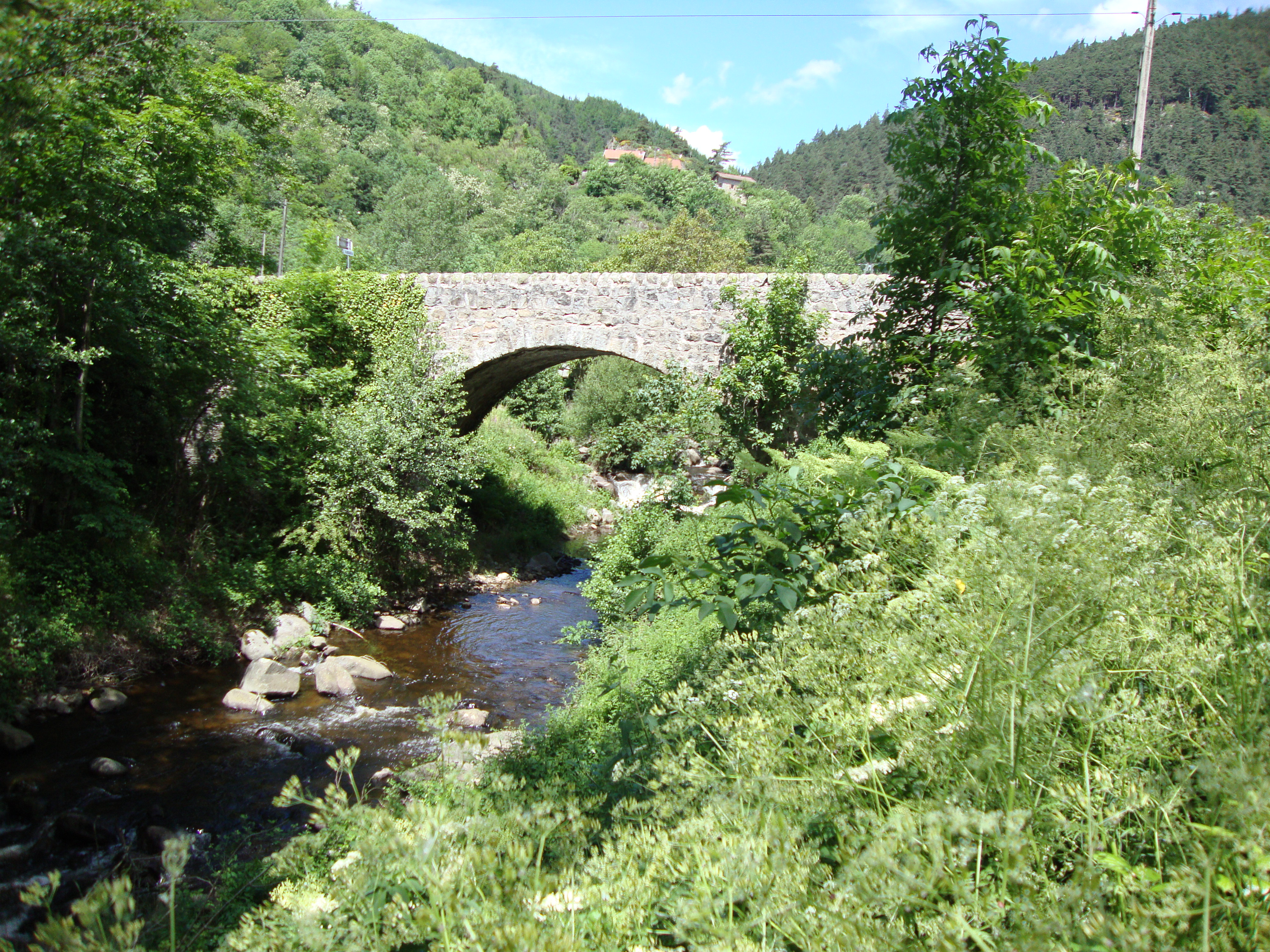
- Bridge over the Eyrieux
- Location of Saint-Julien-d'Intres
- Location within France Location within Auvergne-Rhône-Alpes
- Coordinates: 44°59′01″N 4°21′48″E
- Country: France
- Region: Auvergne-Rhône-Alpes
- Department: Ardèche
- Arrondissement: Tournon-sur-Rhône
- Canton: Haut-Eyrieux
- Intercommunality: Val'Eyrieux

Government
  - Mayor (2020–2026): Catherine Faure
- Area^{1}: 21.17 km^{2} (8.17 sq mi)
- Elevation: 700 m (2,300 ft)
- Highest elevation: 1,093 m (3,586 ft)
- Lowest elevation: 649 m (2,129 ft)
- Population (2023): 303
  - Density: 14.3/km^{2} (37.1/sq mi)
- Time zone: UTC+01:00 (CET)
  - Summer (DST): UTC+02:00 (CEST)
- INSEE/Postal code: 07103 /07320
- ^{1} French Land Register data, which excludes lakes, ponds, glaciers > 1 km^{2} (0.386 sq mi or 247 acres) and river estuaries.

Saint-Julien-d'Intres (French pronunciation: [sɛ̃ ʒyljɛ̃ dɛ̃tʁ]; Occitan: Sant Julian d'Intres) is a commune in the Ardèche department in southern France. It is the result of the merger, on 1 January 2019, of the communes of Intres and Saint-Julien-Boutières.

== Population ==
Historical population
Year	Pop.	±% p.a.
1968	521	—
1975	487	−0.96%
1982	403	−2.67%
1990	352	−1.68%
1999	337	−0.48%
2007	330	−0.26%
2012	337	+0.42%
2017	329	−0.48%
2023	303	−1.36%
Populations of the area corresponding with the commune of Saint-Julien-d'Intres at 1 January 2025. Source: INSEE

== See also ==
- Communes of the Ardèche department
