= Charrais =

- Part of Saint-Martin-la-Pallu
- Location of Charrais
- Location within France Location within Nouvelle-Aquitaine
- Coordinates: 46°42′19″N 0°13′24″E
- Country: France
- Region: Nouvelle-Aquitaine
- Department: Vienne
- Arrondissement: Poitiers
- Canton: Migné-Auxances
- Commune: Saint-Martin-la-Pallu
- Area^{1}: 14.63 km^{2} (5.65 sq mi)
- Elevation: 132 m (433 ft)
- Highest elevation: 137 m (449 ft)
- Lowest elevation: 98 m (322 ft)
- Population (2022): 1,110
  - Density: 75.9/km^{2} (197/sq mi)
- Time zone: UTC+01:00 (CET)
  - Summer (DST): UTC+02:00 (CEST)
- Postal code: 86170
- ^{1} French Land Register data, which excludes lakes, ponds, glaciers > 1 km^{2} (0.386 sq mi or 247 acres) and river estuaries.

Charrais (French pronunciation: [ʃaʁɛ]) is a former commune in the Vienne department in the Nouvelle-Aquitaine region in western France. On 1 January 2017, it was merged into the new commune Saint-Martin-la-Pallu.

== See also ==
- Communes of the Vienne department
