= Belsentes =

- Commune
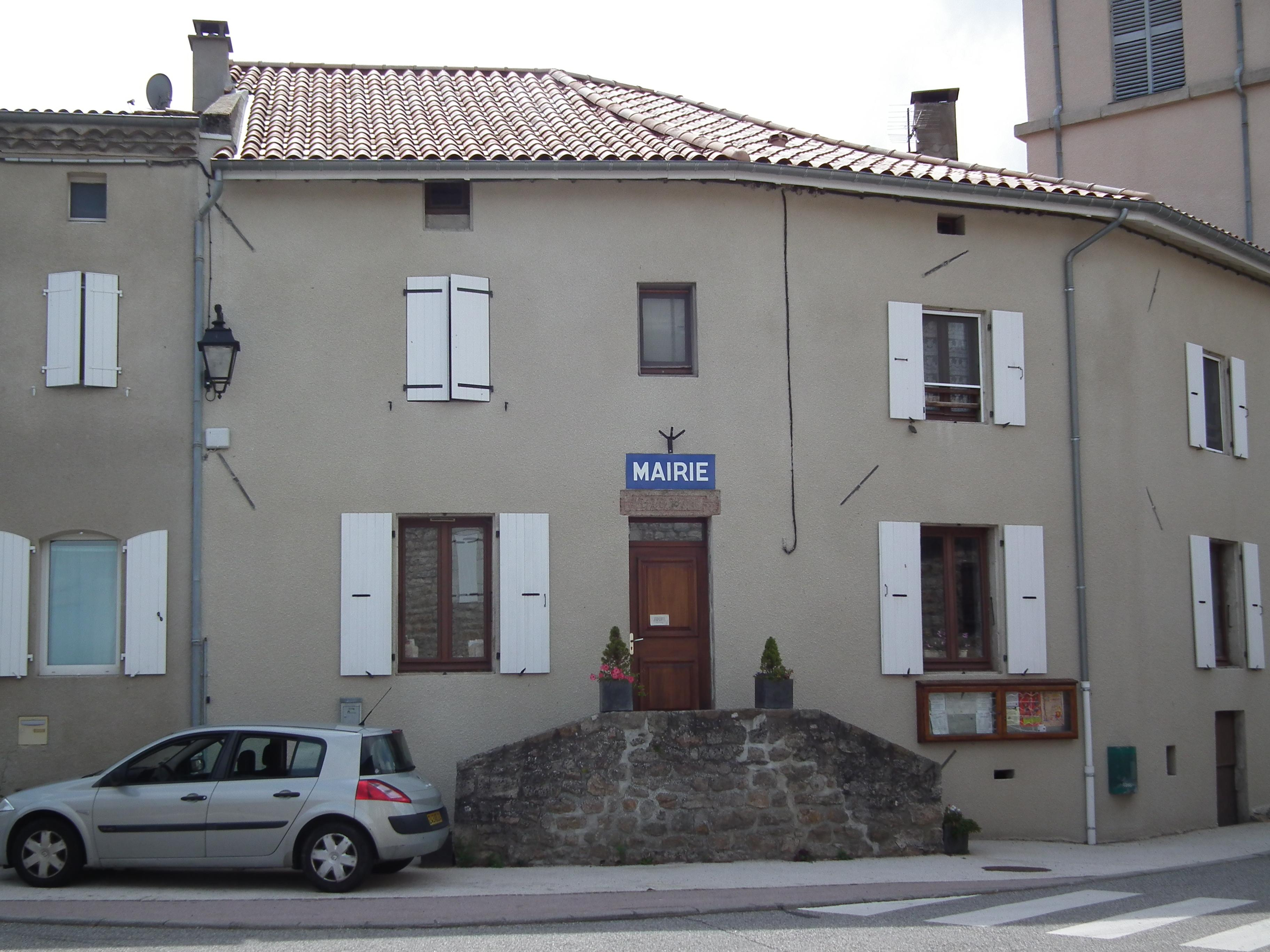
- Belsentes Town hall
- Location of Belsentes
- Location within France Location within Auvergne-Rhône-Alpes
- Coordinates: 44°56′03″N 4°29′16″E
- Country: France
- Region: Auvergne-Rhône-Alpes
- Department: Ardèche
- Arrondissement: Tournon-sur-Rhône
- Canton: Haut-Eyrieux
- Intercommunality: Val'Eyrieux

Government
  - Mayor (2022–2026): Dominique Bresso
- Area^{1}: 25.81 km^{2} (9.97 sq mi)
- Highest elevation: 1,060 m (3,480 ft)
- Lowest elevation: 315 m (1,033 ft)
- Population (2023): 538
  - Density: 20.8/km^{2} (54.0/sq mi)
- Time zone: UTC+01:00 (CET)
  - Summer (DST): UTC+02:00 (CEST)
- INSEE/Postal code: 07165 /07160
- ^{1} French Land Register data, which excludes lakes, ponds, glaciers > 1 km^{2} (0.386 sq mi or 247 acres) and river estuaries.

Belsentes (French pronunciation: [bɛlsɑ̃t]) is a commune in the Ardèche department in southern France. The municipality was established on 1 January 2019 by merger of the former communes of Nonières and Saint-Julien-Labrousse.

== See also ==
- Communes of the Ardèche department
