= Guillon-Terre-Plaine =

- Commune
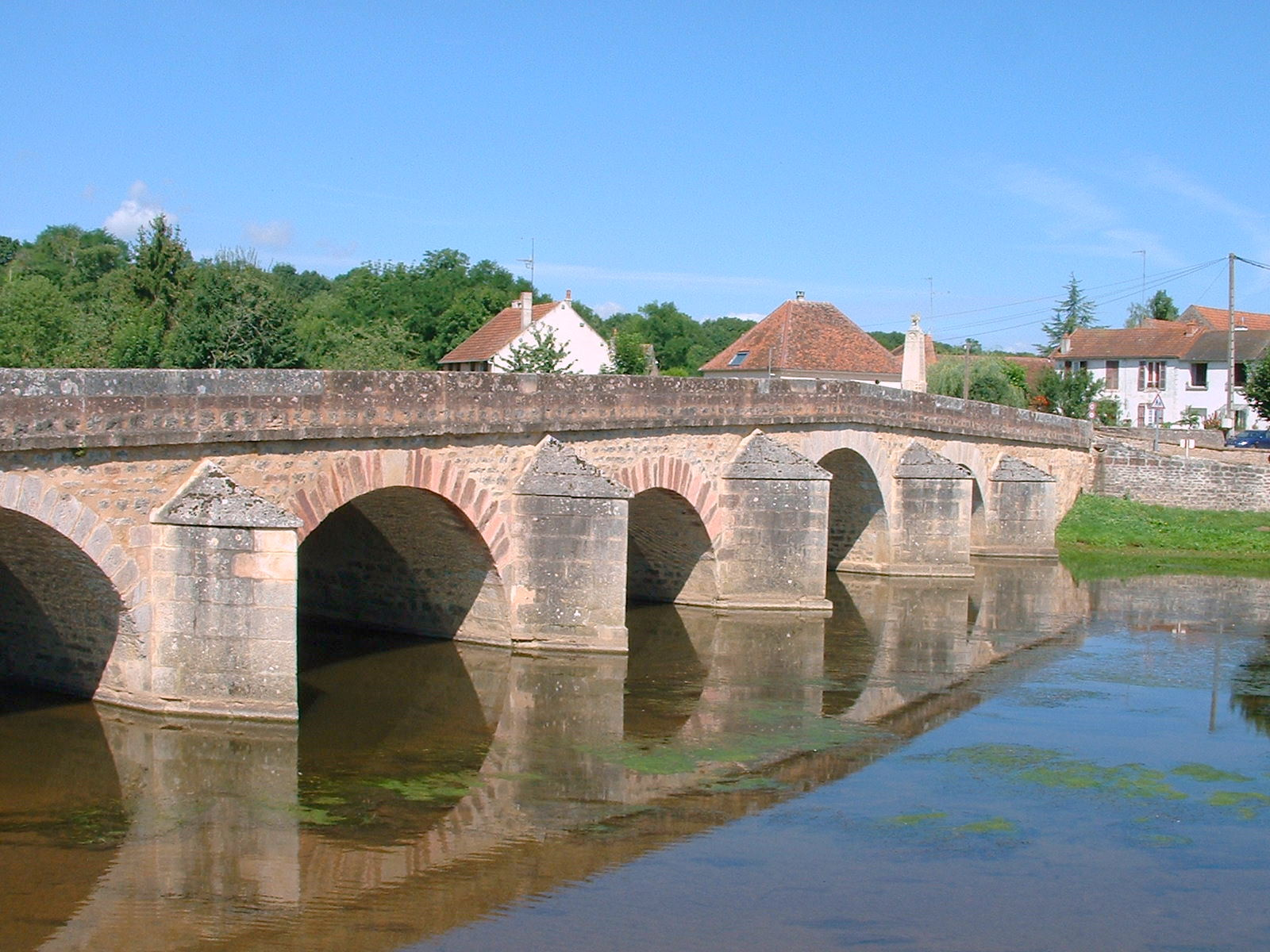
- The bridge in Guillon
- Location of Guillon-Terre-Plaine
- Location within France Location within Bourgogne-Franche-Comté
- Coordinates: 47°30′54″N 4°05′38″E
- Country: France
- Region: Bourgogne-Franche-Comté
- Department: Yonne
- Arrondissement: Avallon
- Canton: Chablis
- Intercommunality: Serein

Government
  - Mayor (2020–2026): Jean-Louis Groguenin
- Area^{1}: 48.49 km^{2} (18.72 sq mi)
- Highest elevation: 328 m (1,076 ft)
- Lowest elevation: 202 m (663 ft)
- Population (2023): 703
  - Density: 14.5/km^{2} (37.5/sq mi)
- Time zone: UTC+01:00 (CET)
  - Summer (DST): UTC+02:00 (CEST)
- INSEE/Postal code: 89197 /89420
- ^{1} French Land Register data, which excludes lakes, ponds, glaciers > 1 km^{2} (0.386 sq mi or 247 acres) and river estuaries.

Guillon-Terre-Plaine (French pronunciation: [ɡɥijɔ̃ tɛʁ plɛn]) is a commune in the Yonne department in Bourgogne-Franche-Comté in central France. It was established on 1 January 2019 by merger of the former communes of Guillon (the seat), Cisery, Sceaux, Trévilly and Vignes.

== See also ==
- Communes of the Yonne department
