= Sinsat =

Commune in Ariège, France

- Part of Aulos-Sinsat
- Location of Sinsat
- Location within France Location within Occitanie
- Coordinates: 42°47′59″N 1°39′47″E
- Country: France
- Region: Occitania
- Department: Ariège
- Arrondissement: Foix
- Canton: Haute-Ariège
- Commune: Aulos-Sinsat
- Area^{1}: 4.01 km^{2} (1.55 sq mi)
- Elevation: 500 m (1,600 ft)
- Highest elevation: 1,481 m (4,859 ft)
- Lowest elevation: 490 m (1,610 ft)
- Population (2021): 99
  - Density: 25/km^{2} (64/sq mi)
- Time zone: UTC+01:00 (CET)
  - Summer (DST): UTC+02:00 (CEST)
- Postal code: 09310
- ^{1} French Land Register data, which excludes lakes, ponds, glaciers > 1 km^{2} (0.386 sq mi or 247 acres) and river estuaries.

Sinsat is a former commune in the Ariège department in southwestern France. On 1 January 2019, it was merged into the new commune Aulos-Sinsat. Inhabitants of Sinsat are called Sinsatois in French.

== See also ==
- Communes of the Ariège department
