= List of French divisions in World War II =

This is a listing of French divisions that served between 1939 and 1945.

== Cavalry, mechanized and armoured divisions ==
=== Light cavalry divisions (DLC, Division Légère de Cavalerie) ===
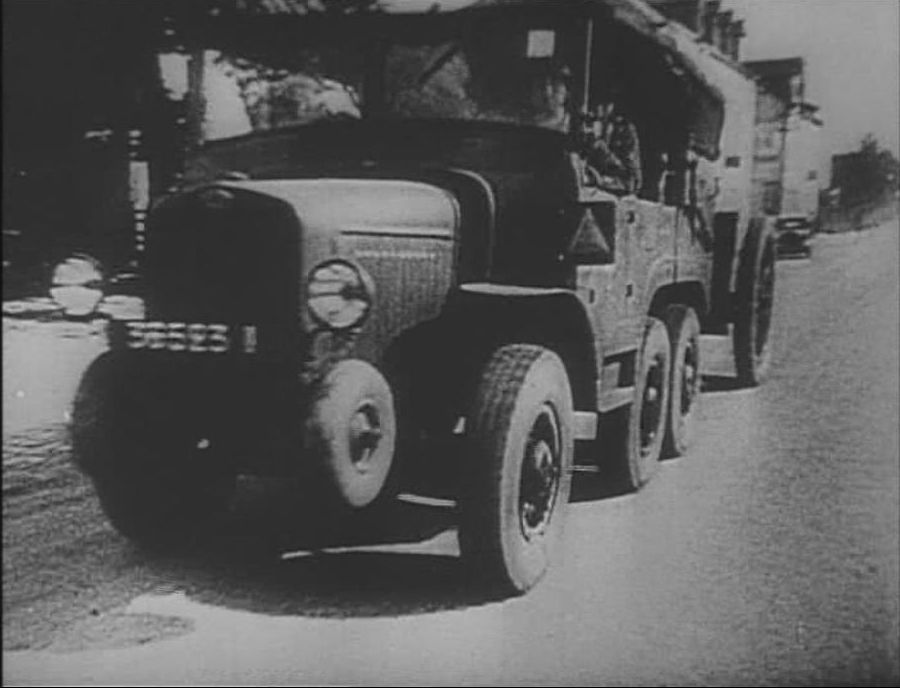
Laffly truck used by motorized forces

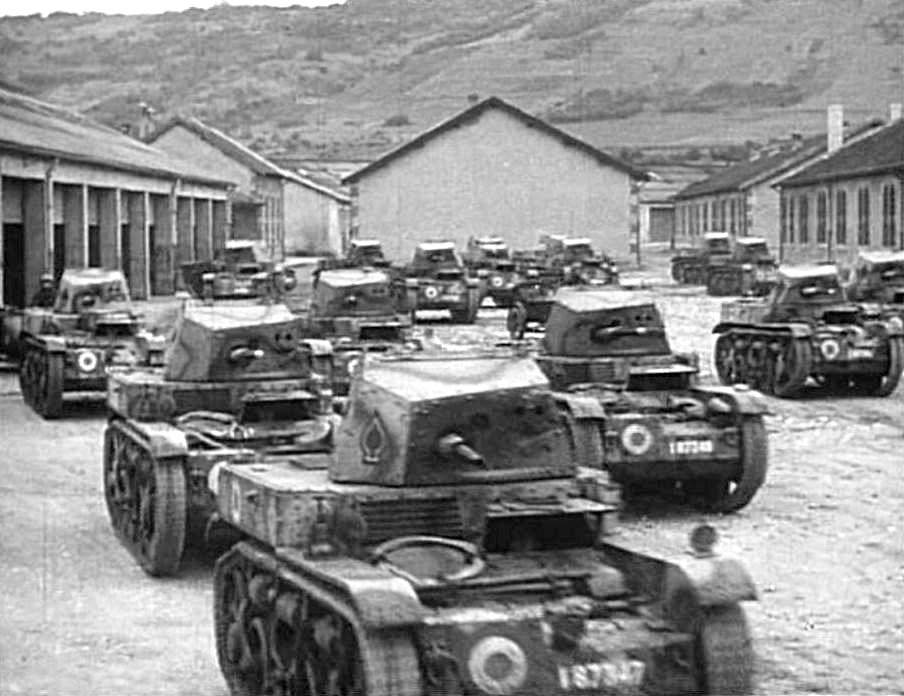
AMR 35 light tanks

Part horse and part motorized; were part of the cavalry arm in 1940. The cavalry divisions (DC) were renamed light divisions (DL) in February 1940 and then light cavalry divisions (DLC) in March 1940.

They were supplied with Renault AMR 33s more so than 35s and Hotchkiss H35s.

№		Final command post at	Subordination
1st	Active as the 1st Cavalry Division at the start of the war and mobilized on 22 August 1939 in various towns in France with the first command post at Marle. Division became the 1st Light Division on 10 February 1940 and then the 1st Light Cavalry Division on 3 March. Campaigns: Battle of the Meuse and Battle of the North. Division had large elements captured by 19 May. Survivors were reorganized as the 4th DLM from 10 June.	Rues-des-Vignes (Vinchy)	9th Army
2nd	Active as the 2nd Cavalry Division at the start of the war and mobilized on 22 August 1939 in Lunéville. Division became the 2nd Light Division on 10 February 1940 and then the 2nd Light Cavalry Division from 5 March. Campaigns: Battle of the Meuse, Meuse Front, Somme Front and Battle of the Somme. Division captured on 12 June.	Saint-Valery-en-Caux	XXI Corps, 10th Army, IX Corps of the 10th Army.
3rd	Active as the 3rd Cavalry Division at the start of the war and mobilized on 20 August 1939 in Paris and Sedan. Division became the 3rd Light Division on 10 February 1940 and then the 3rd Light Cavalry Division from 5 March. Campaigns: Battle of the Meuse, Somme Front, Battle of the Somme and Retreat of the Left Wing. Division disbanded on 11 July 1940.	Le Fleix	3rd Army, 6th Army, 7th Army, 10th Army, IX Corps III Corps
4th	Formed as the 4th Light Division on 16 February 1940 at Saint Rémy de Bouzement. Division became the 4th Light Cavalry Division on 3 March. Campaigns: Battle of the Meuse and Retreat of the center. Division became the 7th DLM on 5 June.	Clairefontaine	9th Army and II and XI Corps of the 9th Army
5th	Formed as the 5th Light Division on 15 February 1940 at La Neuville-au-Pont. Division became the 5th Light Cavalry Division from 3 March. Campaigns: Battle of the Meuse, Aisne and Somme Front, Somme Front and Battle of the Somme. Bulk of division captured by 12 June.	Fontaine-le-Dun	Various corps of the 2nd and 10th Armies
6th	Formed 1 March 1940 in Tunisia. Some elements later part of the FSEA in the Tunisian Campaign.		

=== Light mechanized divisions (DLM, Divisions Légères Mécaniques) ===
Division légère mécaniques were part of the cavalry arm in 1940. Entirely armoured and motorized. Supplied with Renault AMR 35s and Somua S35s.

- 1st Light Mechanized Division (former 4th Cavalry Division). Active division at the start of the war; alerted on 22 August 1939 in Reims. Campaigns: Combat at the mouths of the Escaut, Battle of the North and Retreat of the Left Wing. Division disbanded 11 July 1940. Final command post vicinity Saint-Aquilin (Château de Moncey). Subordination: 7th Army, 9th Army, Cavalry Corps of the 1st Army.
- 2nd Light Mechanized Division (former 5th Cavalry Division). Active division at the start of the war; alerted 23 August 1939 in Melun. Campaigns: Battle of the Dyle, Battle of the North and Retreat of the Left Wing. Division disbanded on 16 July 1940. Final command post at Jumilhac-le-Grand. Subordination: Cavalry Corps II British Corps and X Corps of the Army of Paris.
- 3rd Light Mechanized Division. New division created on 1 February 1940 in Paris. Campaigns: Battle of the Dyle, Battle of the North and Retreat of the Left Wing. Division disbanded on 11 July 1940. Final command post at Ribérac. Subordination: Cavalry Corps and III Corps.
- 4th Light Mechanized Division. Formed 10 June 1940 from remnants of the 1st DLC at Le Perray-en-Yvelines; division was of battle-group strength. Campaigns: Retreat of the center. Division disbanded post-armistice. Final command post at La Souterraine. Subordination: 7th and 6th Armies.
- 7th Light Mechanized Division. Formed 5 June 1940 in reduced strength from remnants of the 4th DLC vicinity Limours. Campaigns: Battle of the Aisne and Retreat of the center. Division became the 7th Cavalry Brigade in the army of Vichy France. Final command post at Moriat. Subordination: Primarily 4th Army, although under 2nd Army and VIII Corps 17–18 June.

=== Armoured divisions (DCr, Divisions Cuirassées) ===
Part of the infantry arm in 1940. Entirely armoured and motorized, equipped with 2 battalions of Char B1 bis and 2 battalions of Hotchkiss H39 tanks designed to support infantry operations.

Armoured divisions
Formation name	Date created	Location created	Date formation ceased to exist	Divisional insignia	Subordinated to	Notable campaigns	Final command post at	Notes	Source(s)
1st Armoured Division	16 January 1940	Châlons-sur-Marne	22 June 1940		XI Army Corps, Ninth Army (Jan. 16 to May 17), Sixth Army (June 1–25)	Battle of the Meuse, Battle of the North, Battle of the Somme and Retreat of the Center	Le Dognon, northeast of Limoges.	Missing half of its motorcycles and artillery caissons on 10 May 1940. Division took serious losses by May 17. Reformed from 18 May until 1 June.	
2nd Armoured Division	16 January 1940	Haute Moivre	July 1940		I Corps, Seventh Army until 29 May. Then, various, including Tenth Army, VII, IX and X Corps, British 51st (Highland) Division and Groupement Cuirassée.	Battle of the Meuse, Fronts of the Aisne and the Somme, Somme Front, Battle of the Somme and Retreat of the Center	Saint-Pierre Cherignat, northeast of Limoges. Division subsequently disbanded.		
3rd Armoured Division	20 March 1940	Reims	18 June 1940		XXI Corps, Second Army until 23 May. Then, various, including Fourth Army and XVIII Corps of 2nd Army.	Battle of the Meuse, Meuse Front, Battle of the Aisne and Retreat of the Center	Montbard, northwest of Dijon.	Division captured 17–18 June.	
4th Armoured Division	15 May 1940	Le Vésinet	19 July 1940			Aisne Front, Somme Front, Battle of the Somme, Retreat of the Left Wing	Cussac, southwest of Limoges.	Initial commander was Charles de Gaulle. Tanks included B1 bis, D2 and R35s.	

== Infantry and mountain divisions ==
Infantry divisions in the French Army fell into three "series"— active, A and B. Series A included higher-quality reserve units. Most of active units had 2/3 of their authorized strength in peace time. At mobilization, all active units were to be brought up to full strength with designated reserve units. Series A units would be created from both active and reserve personals while series B units would only have a limited active component, around 20%.

The divisions were also designated by "type", of which there were Northeast, Overseas and Mountain. The type designation determined numbers and kinds of equipment and weapons allocation.

=== North African Forces 1940 ===
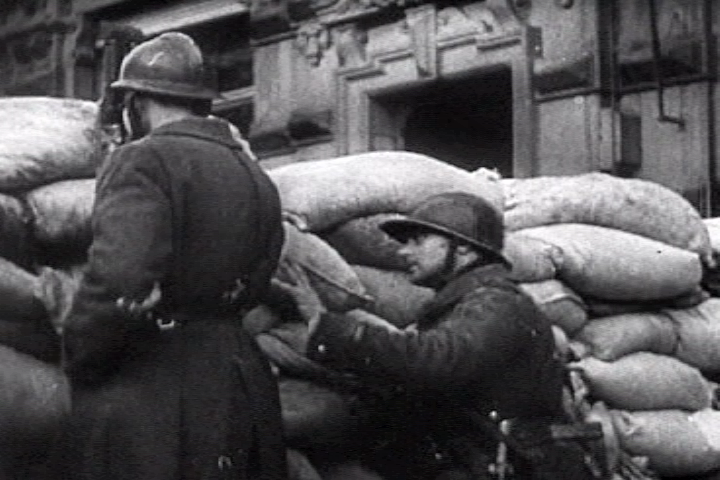
French troops in Paris, 1940

Division types included Moroccan divisions (DM), north African divisions (DINA and DLINA) and African divisions (DIA).

Moroccan divisions
Formation name	Date created	Date formation ceased to exist	Subordinated to	Notable campaigns	Final command post at	Notes	Source(s)
1st Moroccan Division	27 October 1939	12 June 1940	Numerous, including the Colonial Corps, IV Corps, V Corps, Cavalry Corps and XVI Corps.	Battle of the Dyle and Battle of the North	Almenêches-Saint-Pierre	Active division at the start of the war, mobilized 2 September 1939 in Meknes, Morocco. Transported via rail and sea to Marseille and re-equipped as Type Northeast division by 8 November. Evacuated from Dunkirk on 1 June and returned to France by 6 June, where the division's remnants reorganized and became part of the 1st DLINA on 12 June.	
2nd Moroccan Division		Inactivated 10 September 1939 in Morocco.					
3rd Moroccan Division	1939	1 May 1940				In Morocco during 1940 campaign. Elements later assigned to the Fez and Casablanca divisions in the Army of Transition.	

- 1st North African Infantry Division. An active division at the start of the war, mobilized 23 August 1939 in Lyon as a Type Northeast division. Campaigns: Battle of the Meuse and Battle of the North. Division had numerous elements captured during the Battle of the North and remnants were evacuated via Dunkirk from 28 May to 2 June, with some sent back to France and eventually merged into the 1st DLINA. Subordination: XI Corps of the 9th Army, Cavalry Corps of the 1st Army, as well as 1st Army.
- 1st North African Light Infantry Division. Formed 9 June 1940 in Bernay de l'Eure from remnants of the 1st DM and the 1st, 2nd, 4th and 5th DINA, all evacuated from Dunkirk and shipped back to France. Division was weak with four infantry and two artillery battalions. Campaigns: Retreat of the Left Wing. Most of division captured by 18 June. Final command post in the Forêt des Andaines (near Quiberon). Subordination: XVI Corps of the 10th Army.
- 2nd North African Infantry Division. An active division at the start of the war, mobilized on 22 August 1939 in Mangiennes as a Type Northeast division. Campaigns: Battle of the Dyle and Battle of the North. Division captured in large part at Haubourdin on 28 May. Some elements shipped out from Dunkirk and were merged into the 1st DLINA. Final command post at Malo Terminus, near Dunkirk. Subordination: III and V Corps of the 1st Army.
- 3rd North African Infantry Division. An active division at the start of the war, the division was mobilized on 23 August 1939 in Beaumont-en-Argonne as a Type Northeast division. Campaigns: Battle of the Meuse, Meuse Front and Retreat of the Right Wing. Division captured on 23 June 1940. Final command post at Praye. Subordination: X Corps, XVIII Corps and the Colonial Army Corps, all of the 2nd Army.
- 4th North African Infantry Division. An active division at the start of the war, the division was mobilized on 23 August 1939 in Grostenquin as a Type Northeast division. On 10 May 1940, the division was still missing 20% of its personnel and a similar percentage of its transport. Campaigns: Battle of the Meuse and Battle of the North. Division captured on 20 May 1940. North African survivors were merged into the 1st DLINA. Final command post at La Capelle. Subordination: XI Corps of the 9th Army.
- 5th North African Infantry Division. Formation-A-class reserve division mobilized 2 September 1939 as a Type Northeast division in Valence; missing 30% of its 25-mm antitank guns. Campaigns: Battle of the Dyle and Battle of the North. Division captured in large part at Haubourdin on 31 May and 1 June 1940. Those evading capture were evacuated from Dunkirk to England and then shipped back to Brest where they were merged into the 1st DLINA. Final command post at Malo Terminus, near Dunkirk. Subordination: V Corps of the 1st Army.
- 6th North African Infantry Division. New division formed on 1 November 1939 at Chaumont-Porcien as a Type Northeast division. Campaigns: Lorraine Front, Meuse Front and Retreat of the Right Wing. Division captured by 23 June 1940. Final command post at Ochey. Subordination: XVIII and XXI Corps of the 2nd Army.
- 7th North African Infantry Division. New division formed on 16 March 1940 at Brignais as a Type Northeast division. Campaigns: Somme Front, Battle of the Somme and Retreat of the Left Wing. Division disbanded on 10 July. Final command post at Saint-Jory-de-Chalais. Subordination: I Corps of the 7th Army.
- 81st African Infantry Division. 1940 in Tunisia, elements later part of the Algiers Territorial Division in the Army of Transition.
- 82nd African Infantry Division. Category 2 active division at the start of the war. Mobilized on 2 September 1939 in Oran, Algeria as a Type Overseas division; converted to a Type Northeast division in October 1939. Upon mobilization, the division lacked many of its antitank weapons and its motor vehicles were in a poor state of repair. Division shipped to Marseille in the latter part of September 1939. Campaigns: Lorraine Front, Battle of the Aisne and Retreat of the center. Division dispersed by 15 June 1940. Remnants disbanded in south-central France on 25 July. Final command post at Courcemain. Subordination: XX and XXIII Corps.
- 83rd African Infantry Division. 1940 in Tunisia, elements later part of the Constantine Territorial Division in the Army of Transition.
- 84th African Infantry Division. An active mountain division at the start of the war quartered in Gabès, Tunisia, the 84th DIA occupied positions in the Mareth Line in Tunisia until mid-May 1940. The division, with a 60% shortage of motor vehicles, shipped to Marseille by the end of May. Campaigns: Retreat of the Left Wing. Final command post at Monsac. Divisional elements were shipped back to north Africa and disbanded. Subordination: XXV and X Corps.
- 85th African Infantry Division. Formation-A-Class reserve mountain division mobilized 2 September 1939 in Algiers, Algeria. The 85th DIA occupied covering positions along the Libyan border until the end of May 1940 and was shipped to Marseille by 3 June 1940. Campaigns: Somme Front and Retreat of the Left Wing. Final command post at Cadouin. Division disbanded 11 July. Subordination: XXV Corps.
- 86th African Infantry Division. Shipped from Algeria to Lebanon in 1939–1940. Elements later part of the Lebanon South Sector and battled the 7th Australian Division during the Allied invasion of the Levant in 1941.
- 87th African Infantry Division. Formation-A-Class reserve division mobilized 2 September 1939 in Constantine, Algeria. Division occupied positions in Tunisia and was then shipped to Marseille, arriving 8–9 November 1939. Campaigns: Lorraine Front, Aisne and Ailette Front, Battle of the Aisne and Retreat of the center. Final command post at Saint-Gervais (Haute-Vienne), ca. 35 kilometers WSW of Limoges. Division disbanded 16 July 1940. Subordination: XVII Corps of the 6th Army, then XXIV and I Corps, both of the 7th Army.
- 88th African Infantry Division. 1940 in Tunisia, one regiment of which was later part of the 10th DIC.
- 180th African Infantry Division. Formed in December 1939 as part of the South Tunisian Front; 1940 in Tunisia.
- 181st African Infantry Division. 1940 in Algeria, elements later part of the Algiers Territorial Division in the Army of Transition.
- 182nd African Infantry Division. 1940 in Algeria, elements later part of the Oran Territorial Division in the Army of Transition.
- 183rd African Infantry Division. 1940 in Algeria, some elements later part of the Constantine Territorial Division in the Army of Transition.

=== Colonial units ===
- 1st Colonial Infantry Division. An active division at the start of the war and mobilized on 23 August 1939 in Bordeaux as a Type Northeast division. Campaigns: Battle of the Meuse, Meuse Front and Retreat of the Right Wing. Division captured by 23 June. Final command post at Vaudémont. Subordination: XVIII, XXI and Colonial Army Corps, all of the 2nd Army.
- 2nd Colonial Infantry Division. An active mountain infantry division at the start of the war and mobilized on 22 August 1939 in Toulon. Stationed in southeastern France and inactivated on 8 June 1940, with elements used to form the 2nd DLIC and other elements going to the 8th DIC and the XV Corps. Final command post at Mouans-Sartoux. Subordination: 6th Army, Army of the Alps and XV Corps.
- 2nd Colonial Light Infantry Division. New division formed 8 June 1940 from elements of the 2nd DIC; first command post at Noisy-Rudignon. Initially in the Alps, this division was moved north starting 12 June. Campaigns: Alpine Front and Retreat of the center. Final command post at Flavignac. Division inactivated on 11 July 1940. Subordination: XV and XXIV Corps.
- 3rd Colonial Infantry Division. A-class reserve division mobilized on 2 September 1939 in Paris as a Type Northeast division. Campaigns: Battle of the Meuse, Meuse Front and Retreat of the Right Wing. Remnants of division captured on 22 June 1940. Final command post at Marthemont. This division was later formed again in August 1945. Subordination: XVIII Corps, XXI Corps and the Fortified Region of Verdun, all of the 2nd Army.
- 4th Colonial Infantry Division. ?-class reserve division mobilized on 27 August 1939 in Toulouse as a Type Northeast division. Campaigns: Somme Front, Battle of the Somme, Retreat of the Right Wing and Retreat of the Left Wing. Division was gradually destroyed and dispersed by 19 June 1940. Remnants continued retreat and were disbanded on 1 July. Final command post near Fumel, southeast of Bordeaux. Subordination: I Corps of 7th Army, X Corps of 10th Army and XXV Corps of the Army of Paris.
- 5th Colonial Infantry Division. A-class reserve division mobilized on 2 September 1939 in Montpellier as a Type Northeast division. Campaigns: Somme Front, Battle of the Somme and Retreat of the Left Wing. Division inactivated in July 1940. Final command post at Limogne-en-Quercy. Subordination: X Corps, 10th Army III Corps, XII Military Region.
- 6th Colonial Infantry Division. Formation-A-class reserve division mobilized on 2 September 1939 in Saint-Maur sur Indre as a Type Northeast division. Division formed with shortages of 25-mm antitank guns. Campaigns: Meuse Front, Battle of the Aisne, Retreat of the Right Wing and Retreat of the center. Division remnants taken prisoner on 23 June 1940. Final command post at Ochey. Subordination: XXI Corps, Colonial Army Corps and Groupement Dubuisson.
- 7th Colonial Infantry Division. A-class reserve division mobilized on 1 September 1939 in Toulouse as a Type Northeast division. Campaigns: Somme Front, Battle of the Aisne and Retreat of the center. Final command post at La Coquille. Division disbanded on 10 July 1940. Subordination: X Corps, XXIV Corps and I Corps.
- 8th Colonial Infantry Division. New division formed 30 April 1940 in Mérignac as a Type Northeast division. Campaigns: Alpine Front. Division converted to 8th Colonial Light Infantry Division on 6 June. Final command post at Grignan. Subordination: Army of the Alps.
- 8th Colonial Light Infantry Division. New division formed 6 June 1940 in Grignan from the 8th DIC. Campaigns: Retreat of the Left Wing. Final command post at Monbazillac. Division disbanded 11 July. Subordination: Army of Paris and X Corps.

=== Overseas units ===
- 191st Infantry Division 1940 in the Levant, elements later part of the Syria South Sector and battled the 1st DFL and the 5th Indian Infantry Brigade during the Allied invasion of the Levant in 1941.
- 192nd Infantry Division. 1940 in the Levant, elements later part of the Syria South Sector and battled the 1st DFL and the 5th Indian Infantry Brigade during the Allied invasion of the Levant in 1941.
- Tonkin Division. 1940 in Indochina, elements suffered losses and were largely captured by the Japanese in their coup d'état in French Indochina.
- Cochinchina and Cambodia Division. 1940 in Indochina, elements suffered losses and were largely captured by the Japanese in their coup d'état in French Indochina

=== Polish expatriate divisions in 1940 (DIP) ===
French: Division d'infanterie polonaise. Reconstituted Polish Army divisions formed from Polish expatriates in France.

Polish infantry divisions
Formation name	Date created	Location created	Date formation ceased to exist	Divisional insignia	Subordinated to	Notable campaigns	Final command post at	Notes	Source(s)
1st Polish Infantry Division	October 1939 (from the Alpine (High Mountains) Brigade)	Camp de Coëtquidan, in Guer	21 June 1940. Division disbanded and dispersed in Lorraine by divisional commander's orders that day.		Second Army and XX Corps, Third Army	Lorraine Front and Retreat of the Right Wing	Hurbache	Division given contradictory orders by the French XX Corps commanding general (remain in position) and the Polish government-in-exile on 19 June 1940 (place division under British authority or Swiss internment).	
2nd Polish Infantry Division	March 1940	Saint-Loup sur Thouet	20 June 1940. Following Polish government-in-exile's orders, most of the division (12,000 troops) crossed the Swiss frontier on 20 June and was interned.		Second Army Group, Third Army and XLV Fortress Corps, 8th Army	Retreat of the Right Wing	Indevillers	Division was missing its 47-mm antitank company. The division was moved to the front lines from 20 to 22 May. Three battalions of the division were taken POW by the Germans.	

=== Motorized and infantry divisions ===
Division types included infantry and mountain divisions (DI - no special abbreviation for mountain divisions), motorized divisions (DIM) and fortress divisions (DIF).

- 1st Motorized Infantry Division. Active division at the start of the war; alerted on 23 August 1939 in Lille. Campaigns: Battle of the Dyle and Battle of the North. Part of division (Groupement Jenoudet) was captured, the rest evacuated to England during 2–3 June 1940 and then reembarked for Cherbourg and Brest where they were reorganized as the 1st DLI. Final command post at Malo-les-Bains by Dunkirk. Subordination: III Corps. The 1st Infantry Division was recreated in February 1945 and served with the French First Army.
- 2nd Infantry Division. Formation-A-class reserve division mobilized 2 September 1939 as a Type Northeast division in Saint-André; missing part of its 25-mm antitank guns. Campaigns: Lorraine Front, Aisne Front, Battle of the Aisne and Retreat of the center. Bulk of division captured by 15 June 1940. Final command post at Chapelle-Vallon. Subordination: VI Corps, 6th Army, XXIII Corps, 4th Army and 2nd Army.
- 3rd Motorized Infantry Division. Active division at the start of the war; alerted on 25 August 1939 in Amiens. Campaigns: Battle of the Meuse, Meuse Front, Aisne Front and Retreat of the center. Bulk of the division captured by 18 June 1940. Final command post at Saint-Seine. Subordination: XXI Corps of 2nd Army and VIII Corps of 4th Army.
- 4th Infantry Division. Formation-A-class reserve division mobilized 2 September 1939 as a Type Northeast division in Hirson; antitank gun shortage was resolved by April 1940. Automotive material was diverse and not in good condition. Campaigns: Combats at the mouths of the Escaut and the Battle of the North. Division mostly captured at Lille or Dunkirk but some evacuated from Dunkirk 31 May – 3 June. Evacuated elements returned to Brest 4–5 June and were assigned to various units. Final command post at beaches of Dunkirk. Subordination: 7th Army, 1st Army and IV Corps of 1st Army.
- 5th Motorized Infantry Division. Active division at the start of the war; alerted on 23 August 1939 in Caen. Campaigns: Battle of the Meuse and Battle of the North. Elements of the division were captured and the unit was disbanded on 25 May 1940. Some elements were evacuated via Dunkirk or otherwise evaded the Germans and were used to form diverse other units. Final command post at Dunkirk. Subordination: II Corps of 9th Army until 17 May, then 1st Army.
- 6th Infantry Division. Formation-A-class reserve division mobilized 2 September 1939 as a Type Northeast division in Roncherolles-sur-le-Vivier. Division had a serious shortage of horses and no divisional antitank company on 10 May 1940. Campaigns: Lorraine Front, Battle of the Meuse, Meuse Front and Retreat of the Right Wing. Remnants (2,500 men) of division captured on 22 June 1940. Final command post at Thuilley-aux-Groseilles. Subordination: 2nd Army, XVIII and XXI Corps of the 2nd Army and Groupement Dubuisson.
- 7th Infantry Division. Formation-A-class reserve division mobilized 2 September 1939 as a Type Northeast division in Le Mans. Campaigns: Lorraine Front, Aisne and Ailette Front, Battle of the Aisne and Retreat of the center. Division disbanded July 1940. Some elements retained in Vichy Army. Final command post at La Meyze. Subordination: Colonial Army Corps of the 3rd Army, 3rd Army, 6th Army and XVII and XVIII Corps of the 6th Army.
- 8th Infantry Division. New division formed 1 April 1940 as a Type Northeast division in Coutras. Campaigns: Aisne and Ailette Front, Battle of the Aisne and Retreat of the center. Division disbanded on 16 July 1940. Final command post at Saint-Pardoux. Subordination: XVII Corps of the 6th Army.
- 9th Motorized Infantry Division. Active division at the start of the war; alerted on 26 August 1939 in Orléans, Nevers, Bourges and Limoges. Campaigns: Combats at the mouths of the Escaut and the Battle of the North. Division in large part captured by 20 May 1940 along the Sambre–Oise Canal. Remnants attached to the 43rd DI and 9th DIC. Final command post at Bohain-en-Vermandois. Subordination: XVI Corps of the 7th Army and 9th Army.
- 10th Infantry Division. Active division at the start of the war; alerted on 23 August 1939 vicinity Paris. Campaigns: Aisne Front, Battle of the Aisne and Retreat of the center. Bulk of division captured over the course of the campaign; 649 men remained in the division by the time of the armistice. Final command post at Saint-Flour, Cantal. Subordination: XXIII Corps and 2nd Army. The 10th Infantry Division was recreated in October 1944 and served in Alsace and on the Atlantic coast.
- 11th Infantry Division. Active division at the start of the war; alerted on 22 August 1939 in Nancy. Campaigns: Lorraine Front, Aisne Front, Battle of the Aisne and Retreat of the center. Division disbanded on 11 July 1940. Final command post at Saint-Pardoux. Subordination: I and XXIV Corps of the 7th Army.
- 12th Motorized Infantry Division. Active division at the start of the war; alerted on 23 August 1939 in Chalons-sur-Marne. Campaigns: Lorraine Front, Northern Frontier, Battle of the Dyle and Battle of the North. Division captured on 4 June 1940. Final command post at Dunkirk. Subordination: V and III Corps of the 1st Army.
- 13th Infantry Division. Active division at the start of the war; alerted on 22 August 1939 in the region of Bourogne. Campaigns: Alsace Front, Somme Front, Battle of the Somme and Retreat of the Left Wing. Bulk of division lost during final retreat but unit still intact on 25 June 1940. Final command post at Lalinde. Subordination: Multiple corps of the 8th, 7th and 10th Armies, as well as the XXV Corps of the Army of Paris. Final subordination to Task Force de Bazelaire.
- 14th Infantry Division. Active division at the start of the war; alerted on 25 August 1939 in the region of Mulhouse. Campaigns: Alsace Front, Lorraine Front, Battle of the Meuse, Aisne Front, Battle of the Aisne and Retreat of the center. Unit still intact on 25 June 1940. Final command post at Champeix. Subordination: XXIII Corps of the 6th and 4th Armies, VIII Corps of 4th Army. The 14th Infantry Division was recreated on 16 February 1945 and served with the French First Army.
- 15th Motorized Infantry Division. Active division at the start of the war; alerted on 23 August 1939 in Dijon. Campaigns: Lorraine Front, Battle of the Dyle and Battle of the North. Bulk of division captured south of Lille on 29 May 1940; some elements embarked at Dunkirk and shipped to Brest and Cherbourg. Final command post in Faubourg des Postes (Lille). Subordination: IV Corps of the 1st Army.
- 16th Infantry Division. Formation-A-class reserve division mobilized 2 September 1939 in Dijon. Campaigns: Alsace Front, Somme Front, Battle of the Somme and Retreat of the center. Division reduced to strength of four battalions at time of the armistice. Final command post in Cuzorn. Subordination: XII, X and XXV Corps; subordinated to various armies during course of campaign.
- 17th Infantry Division. Initially scheduled to be formed on 31 March 1940, this formation was canceled and the component units assigned to other divisions. After the breakthrough at Sedan during 10–15 May 1940, remnants of the 55th DI and 71st DI were organized into a new division, which rapidly went through three names: 55th DI, 71st DI and 17th DI (on 21 May). The division remained in general reserve until being released for the defense of Verdun. On 30 May, the division was retitled the 59th DLI.
- 18th Infantry Division. Formation-A-class reserve division mobilized 2 September 1939 as a Type Northeast division in Tours. Campaigns: Lorraine Front, Northern Frontier, Battle of the Meuse and Battle of the North. Division encircled and almost entirely destroyed vicinity Beaumont on 16 May 1940. Final command post at Damousies. Subordination: XI Corps of the 9th Army.
- 19th Infantry Division. Active division at the start of the war; alerted on 25 August 1939 in Rennes. Campaigns: Lorraine Front, Alsace Front, Somme Front, Battle of the Somme and Retreat of the Left Wing. Division intact at time of armistice. Final command post at Pierre-Buffière. Subordination: XIII Corps and I Corps of the 7th Army. The 19th Infantry Division was recreated in September 1944 and served on the Atlantic coast.
- 20th Infantry Division. Formation-A-class reserve division mobilized 2 September 1939 in Rennes. Campaigns: Northern Frontier, Lorraine Front, Meuse Front, Battle of the Aisne and Retreat of the center. Division encircled and captured on the left bank of the Seine on 15 June 1940. Final command post at Sainte-Maure (5 kilometers north of Troyes). Subordination: XLII Corps of the 3rd Army and VII Corps of the 6th Army.
- 21st Infantry Division. Active division at the start of the war; alerted 25 August 1939 in Nantes. Campaigns: Lorraine Front, Northern Frontier, Battle of the Scheldt Estuary and Battle of the North. Division surrendered after the Battle of Boulogne on 25 May 1940. Final command post at Boulogne. Subordination: Reserve of the High Command and Admiral commanding the Northern Front.
- 22nd Infantry Division. Formation-A-class reserve division mobilized 23 August 1939 in the 11th Military Region. Campaigns: Lorraine Front, Battle of the Meuse and Battle of the North. Bulk of division captured vicinity Wimy on 18 May 1940 after defending the forest of Saint-Michel. Final command post at Wimy. Subordination: Colonial Army Corps of the 3rd Army and XI Corps of the 9th Army.
- 23rd Infantry Division. Active division at the start of the war; alerted 25 August 1939 in Limoges. Campaigns: Lorraine Front, Alsace Front, Somme and Aisne Front, Battle of the Aisne and Retreat of the center. Division intact at time of armistice; unit disbanded on 11 July 1940. Final command post at Jumilhac-le-Grand. Subordination: XXIV Corps of the 7th Army. The 23rd Infantry Division was recreated in January 1945 and served on the Atlantic coast.
- 24th Infantry Division. Formation-A-class reserve division mobilized 3 September 1939 in Limoges. Campaigns: Lorraine Front, Somme Front, Battle of the Somme and Retreat of the Left Wing. Division strength down to 100 to 200 men per regiment by 11 June 1940. Division still in existence at time of armistice; unit disbanded 11 July 1940. Final command post at Cubas. Subordination: X Corps of the 10th Army and Task Force de Bazelaire, among others.
- 25th Motorized Infantry Division. Active division at the start of the war; alerted 27 August 1939 in Clermont-Ferrand. Campaigns: Lorraine Front, Northern Frontier, Battle of the Scheldt Estuary and Battle of the North. Bulk of division captured vicinity Canteleu and Lambersart on the evening of 31 May 1940. Final command post at Bray-Dunes. Subordination: Various corps, almost all subordinated to 1st Army. The 25th Infantry Division was recreated in April 1945 and served on the Atlantic coast.
- 26th Infantry Division. Formation-A-class reserve division mobilized 2 September 1939 in Clermont-Ferrand. Campaigns: Lorraine Front and Retreat of the Right Wing. Bulk of division captured in the Charmes Forest on the night of 20–21 June 1940. Final command post at Charmes. Subordination: VI Corps of the 3rd Army.
- 27th Mountain Infantry Division. Formation-A-class reserve division mobilized 22 August 1939 in Gap. Division converted to a type Northeast infantry division on 27 October 1939. Campaigns: Alpine Frontier, Lorraine Front, Battle of the Aisne and Retreat of the center. Division intact at time of armistice. Final command post at Saint-Dizier-Leyrenne. Subordination: VIII, XVII and VII Corps of various armies. The 27th Mountain Infantry Division was recreated in November 1944 and served on the Alpine frontier.
- 28th Mountain Infantry Division. Formation-A-class reserve division mobilized 22 August 1939 in Chambéry. Campaigns: Alpine Frontier, Lorraine Front, Aisne Front, Battle of the Aisne and Retreat of the center. Division intact at time of armistice; elements disbanded by 31 July 1940. Final command post at Marsac. Subordination: XVII and VII Corps of the 6th Army.
- 29th Mountain Infantry Division. Formation-A-class reserve division mobilized 22 August 1939 in Nice. Campaigns: Alpine Frontier, Lorraine Front, Somme Front, Battle of the Somme and Retreat of the Left Wing. Bulk of division captured or destroyed between the Somme and Le Beuvron during the period 5–19 June 1940; remnants disbanded by 11 July 1940. Final command post at Hautefort. Subordination: XXIV and I Corps of the 7th Army.
- 30th Mountain Infantry Division. Formation-A-class reserve division mobilized 22 August 1939 in Marseille. Division converted to a type Northeast infantry division on 27 October 1939. Campaigns: Alpine Frontier, Lorraine Front and Retreat of the Right Wing. Division captured vicinity Saint-Dié on 23 June 1940. Final command post in the woods by Belmont. Subordination: XLIII Fortress Corps of the 5th Army and XII Corps of the 3rd Army.
- 31st Mountain Infantry Division. Formation-A-class reserve division mobilized 27 August 1939 in Montpellier. Campaigns: Lorraine Front, Somme Front, Battle of the Somme and Retreat of the Left Wing. Division captured in Saint-Valery-en-Caux on 12 June 1940. Final command post at Gueutteville. Subordination: IX Corps of the 10th Army.
- 32nd Infantry Division. Formation-A-class reserve division mobilized 22 August 1939 in Montpellier. Also known as the 32nd Light Infantry Division after 12 June 1940. Campaigns: Lorraine Front, Battle of the Dyle, Battle of the North and Retreat of the Left Wing. Division captured in parts between 4 and 18 June 1940 in the region between Dunkirk and Falaise. Final command post at Saint-Vigor-des-Mézerets. Subordination: III Corps of the 1st Army and XVI Corps of the 10th Army.
- 35th Infantry Division. Formation-A-class reserve division mobilized 2 September 1939 in Bordeaux. Campaigns: Lorraine Front, Alsace Front, Aisne Front, Battle of the Aisne and Retreat of the Right Wing. Division captured vicinity Ochey on 22 June 1940; at time of surrender, the unit had been reduced to a strength of a little over 6,000 men. Final command post at Germiny. Subordination: Colonial Army Corps and XXI Corps of the 2nd Army.
- 36th Infantry Division. Active division at the start of the war; alerted 28 August 1939 in Bordeaux. Campaigns: Lorraine Front, Northern Frontier, Aisne Front, Battle of the Aisne and Retreat of the Right Wing. Division captured 21 June 1940 vicinity Vézelise. Final command post at Gugney. Subordination: X Corps and Colonial Army Corps of the 2nd Army. The 36th Infantry Division was recreated in February 1945 but did not see combat before the war in Europe ended.
- 40th Infantry Division. Formed 31 May 1940 at Morain-Villiers from the 2nd Light Chasseurs Division. Campaigns: Battle of the Somme and Retreat of the Left Wing. Division intact at time of armistice; disbanded on 31 July 1940. Final command post at Cahors. Subordination: IX Corps of the 10th Army.
- 41st Infantry Division. Formation-A-class reserve division mobilized 2 September 1939 in Versailles. Campaigns: Lorraine Front, Northern Frontier, Battle of the Meuse, Meuse Front, Battle of the Aisne and Retreat of the center. All but 1,300 men of the division captured on 17–18 June 1940 vicinity Gondreville. Final command post at Gondreville. Subordination: XVIII Corps of the 2nd Army and XVII Corps of the 6th Army.
- 42nd Infantry Division. Active division at the start of the war; alerted 20 August 1939 in Metz. Campaigns: Lorraine Front, Aisne Front, Battle of the Aisne and Retreat of the center. Division mostly captured on 17 June 1940 vicinity Les Riceys. Final command post at Les Riceys. Subordination: XXIII Corps of the 6th and 4th Armies.
- 43rd Infantry Division. Active division at the start of the war; alerted 23 August 1939 in Weyersheim. Campaigns: Alsace Front, Battle of the Dyle, Battle of the North and Retreat of the Left Wing. Division embarked at Dunkirk and returned to France via Brest. Division captured 18–26 June 1940 between Passais and Belligné. Final command post at Passais. Subordination: 1st Army, Commander of Zone B and XVI Corps.
- 44th Infantry Division. Division formed 1 March 1940 at Dourdan. Campaigns: Aisne Front, Battle of the Aisne and Retreat of the center. Division reduced to strength below 2,500 by time of armistice. Final command post at Mauriac. Subordination: XXIII, XVII and VII Corps of the 6th Army.
- 45th Infantry Division. Formation-A-class reserve division mobilized 2 September 1939 in Orléans. Campaigns: Lorraine Front, Aisne Front, Battle of the Aisne and Retreat of the center. Division captured or dispersed by 14 June 1940. Final command post at Arcis-sur-Aube. Subordination: VII Corps of the 6th Army.
- 47th Infantry Division. Formation-A-class reserve division mobilized 2 September 1939 in Besançon. Campaigns: Alsace Front, Lorraine Front, Battle of the Aisne and Retreat of the center. Division intact at time of armistice. Final command post at Mareuil. Subordination: IX Corps of the 4th Army and I Corps of the 7th Army.
- 51st Infantry Division. Formation-B-class reserve division mobilized 2 September 1939 in Lille. Campaigns: Northern Frontier, Battle of the Meuse, Lorraine Front and Retreat of the Right Wing. Division captured 23 June 1940 vicinity Villey-le-Sec. Final command post at Sexey-aux-Forges. Subordination: XXIV and XLII Corps of the 3rd Army.
- 52nd Infantry Division. Formation-B-class reserve division mobilized 24 August 1939 in Mézières. Campaigns: Northern Frontier, Lorraine Front and Retreat of the Right Wing. Division captured 23 June 1940 vicinity La Bourgonce. Final command post at La Salle. Subordination: XX Corps of the 4th Army and Groupement de la Saare of 2nd Army Group.
- 53rd Infantry Division. Formation-B-class reserve division mobilized 2 September 1939 in Bourbourg. Campaigns: Northern Frontier, Battle of the Meuse, Aisne Front and Retreat of the center. Division reduced to some 800 men at the time of the armistice; designated as the 53rd Light Infantry Division after 31 May 1940. Final command post at Allègre. Subordination: XLI Fortress Corps of the 9th Army and VIII Corps of the 4th Army.
- 54th Infantry Division. Formation-B-class reserve division mobilized 2 September 1939 in Le Mans. Campaigns: Alsace Front and Retreat of the Right Wing. Division captured 22 June 1940 vicinity Sainte-Marie-aux-Mines. Final command post at Corcieux. Subordination: XIII Corps of the 8th Army.
- 55th Infantry Division. Formation-B-class reserve division mobilized 3 October 1939 in Orléans. Campaigns: Northern Frontier and Battle of the Meuse. Division panicked at the Battle of Bulson on 13 May 1940 and was disbanded on 18 May 1940 with elements going to the second formation of the 17th Infantry Division. Final command post at Manre. Subordination: X Corps of the 2nd Army.
- 56th Infantry Division. Formation-B-class reserve division mobilized 2 September 1939 in Châlons-sur-Marne. Campaigns: Lorraine Front and Retreat of the center. Division captured 16 June 1940 vicinity Aignay-le-Duc. Final command post at Prairay, two kilometers WSW of Francheville. Subordination: Colonial Army Corps and VI Corps of 3rd Army and XVIII Corps of 2nd Army.
- 57th Infantry Division. Formation-B-class reserve division mobilized 2 September 1939 in the region of Besançon. Campaigns: Alsace Front, Battle of the Aisne and Retreat of the center. Division intact at the time of armistice; disbanded on 11 July 1940. Final command post at Hiesse. Subordination: XLV Fortress Corps of 3rd Army Group and XXIV Corps of the 7th Army.
- 58th Infantry Division. Formation-B-class reserve division mobilized 2 September 1939 in Dijon. Campaigns: Lorraine Front and Retreat of the Right Wing. Division reduced to strength of three battalions over course of campaign and captured 22 June 1940 east of Ochey. Final command post at Ochey. Subordination: XLII Fortress Corps and Groupement Dubuisson.
- 60th Infantry Division. Formation-B-class reserve division mobilized 2 September 1939 in Rennes. Campaigns: Northern Frontier, Battle for the Scheldt Estuary and the Battle of the North. Division cut off in the north, some 1,000 men evacuated to Great Britain without equipment. Remainder of division captured 4 June 1940 vicinity Malo Terminus near Dunkirk. Final command post: Malo Terminus. Subordination: 7th Army and XVI Corps.
- 61st Infantry Division. Formation-B-class reserve division mobilized 2 September 1939 in Nantes. Campaigns: Northern Frontier and Battle of the Meuse. Division isolated and cut up by German armored thrusts 15–16 May 1940 and subsequently disbanded on 27 May 1940 with elements going to the 236th and 241st Light Infantry Divisions. Final command post at Louviers. Subordination: XLI Fortress Corps of the 9th Army.
- 62nd Infantry Division. Formation-B-class reserve division mobilized 2 September 1939 in Limoges. At mobilization, division lacked sufficient troops, cadre, vehicles and antitank guns for complete establishment. Campaigns: Lorraine Front, Alsace Front and Retreat of the Right Wing. Division captured vicinity Donon between 21 and 23 June 1940. Final command post at Donon. Subordination: XVII Corps and 103rd Fortress Division of the 5th Army.
- 63rd Infantry Division. Formation-B-class reserve division mobilized 3 September 1939 in Clermont-Ferrand. Campaigns: Alsace Front and Retreat of the Right Wing. Division captured on 22 June 1940 vicinity Bussang. Final command post at Bussang. Subordination: XLV and XLIV Fortress Corps of the 8th Army.
- 64th (Mountain) Infantry Division. Formation-B-class reserve division mobilized 2 September 1939 in Valence. Campaigns: Alpine Frontier and Alpine Front. Division intact at time of armistice; disbanded 10 July 1940. Final command post at Embrun. Subordination: XIV Corps of the Army of the Alps.
- 65th (Mountain) Infantry Division. Formation-B-class reserve division mobilized 2 September 1939 in Marseille. Campaigns: Alpine Frontier and Alpine Front. Division intact at time of armistice; disbanded 11 July 1940. Final command post at Levens. Subordination: XV Corps of the Army of the Alps.
- 66th (Mountain) Infantry Division. Formation-B-class reserve division mobilized 2 September 1939 in Montpellier. Campaigns: Alpine Frontier and Alpine Front. Division intact at time of armistice; disbanded 8 July 1940. Final command post at La Combe-de-Lancey. Subordination: XIV Corps of the Army of the Alps.
- 67th Infantry Division. Formation-B-class reserve division mobilized 12 September 1939 in Toulouse. Campaigns: Alsace Front and Retreat of the Right Wing. Division captured 18 June 1940 vicinity Maîche. Some elements crossed the Swiss border and entered internment. Final command post at Brémoncourt. Subordination: XLIV and XLV Fortress Corps of the 8th Army.
- 68th Infantry Division. Formed 16 January 1940 in Dunkirk. Campaigns: Battle of the Scheldt Estuary and Battle of the North. Division captured at Dunkirk on 4 June 1940. Final command post at Dunkirk. Subordination: XVI Corps of the Admiral-North.
- 70th Infantry Division. Formation-B-class reserve division mobilized 2 September 1939 in Nancy. Campaigns: Alsace Front and Retreat of the Right Wing. Division captured 21–22 June 1940 vicinity Padoux. Final command post in a forest outside of Padoux. Subordination: XII Corps of the 5th Army.
- 71st Infantry Division. Formation-B-class reserve division mobilized 2 September 1939 in Versailles. Campaigns: Northern Frontier and Battle of the Meuse. Division panicked at the Battle of Bulson on 13–14 May 1940 and was disbanded on 21 May 1940 with elements going to the second formation of the 17th Infantry Division. Final command post at Verdun. Subordination: X Corps of the 2nd Army.
- 101st Fortress Division. Formed 16 March 1940 near Haumont-près-Samogneux from the Fortified Sector of Maubeuge. Campaigns: Northern Frontier, Battle of the Dyle and Battle of the North. Part of division captured at Dunkirk after 3 June 1940; one regiment embarked at Dunkirk for Normandy and were captured on 17 June 1940 vicinity Falaise. Final command post at Dunkirk. Subordination: 1st Army.
- 102nd Fortress Division. Formed 1 January 1940 in Rimogne from elements of the Ardennes Defensive Sector. Campaigns: Northern Frontier and Battle of the Meuse. Bulk of division captured near Thin-le-Moutier. Final command post at the Valcontent Farm, approximately 3.5 kilometers from Thin-le-Moutier. Subordination: XLI Fortress Corps of the 9th Army.
- 103rd Fortress Division. Formed 5 March 1940 from the Fortified Sector of the Lower Rhine. Campaigns: Alsace Front and Retreat of the Right Wing. Division captured 23 June 1940 as part of surrender of the 5th Army. Final command post at Salm near Waldersbach. Subordination: XVII Corps and XLIII Fortress Corps of the 5th Army.
- 104th Fortress Division. Formed 3 March 1940 from the Fortified Sector of Colmar. Campaigns: Alsace Front and Retreat of the Right Wing. Division captured 21 June 1940 vicinity Xonrupt. Final command post at Xonrupt. Subordination: XII and XIII Corps of the 8th Army.
- 105th Fortress Division. Formed 16 March 1940 from the Fortified Sector of Mulhouse. Campaigns: Alsace Front and Retreat of the Right Wing. Division captured 22 June 1940 near Mollau. Final command post at Rouge-Gazon, approximate 4 kilometers SW of Mollau. Subordination: XIII Corps and XLIV Fortress Corps of the 8th Army.

=== Light Chasseurs Divisions (DLCh) ===
The Chasseurs divisions were organized in April 1940 and were intended for use in Norway.

Light Chasseurs divisions
Formation name	Date created	Location created	Date formation ceased to exist	Subordinated to	Notable campaigns	Final command post at	Notes	Source(s)
1st Light Chasseurs Division	15 April 1940 (from the Alpine (High Mountains) Brigade)	Brest	22 June 1940	French Scandinavian Expeditionary Corps and Commander of the Brittany Defense Line	Norway and western France. Division landed in Norway on 19 April 1940 and evacuated Norway from 3–7 June 1940. Elements landed briefly in Brittany and fought in SW Normandy, then embarked for Great Britain.	Casablanca	Some 1,200 men volunteered for service with the Free French while in UK. Remainder were shipped to Morocco in July. Some remained in French North Africa while others repatriated to France by 4 August 1940.	
2nd Light Chasseurs Division	18 April 1940	Brest	31 May 1940 (renamed as the 40th Infantry Division)	French Scandinavian Expeditionary Corps and Reserve of the High Command	None	Morain-Villiers	Intended for use in Norway and shipped to Scotland before being returned to Brest by 19 May 1940.	

=== Light Infantry Divisions (DLI) ===
Most formed in May or June 1940. The light divisions had only two infantry regiments and were missing much equipment.

- 1st Light Infantry Division. Formed 10 June 1940 near Évreux from 3,400 men of the 1st DIM who were evacuated from Dunkirk and returned to France, as well as other elements. Four battalions of infantry, 2 battalions of artillery; all other branches nonexistent or in embryonic form. Campaigns: Retreat of the Left Wing. The division was forced west of Caen, dispersed and bypassed by the Germans during 19–25 June. Surrendered on 29 June. Final command post at Juvigny-le-Tertre. Subordination: XVI Corps 10 to 29 June 1940.
- 3rd Light Infantry Division. Formed 15 April 1940 near Brest and intended for service in Norway. Division had two infantry regiments, an antitank company, a tank company, a reconnaissance battalion and an artillery battalion. Instead of Norway, the division was transported via rail to Paris and then to the Somme River vicinity Noyon. Campaigns: Defense of the Somme and the Aisne, Battle of the Aisne and the Retreat of the center. Final division assembly was at Nexon, SW of Limoges. Subordination: XXIV Corps from 18 May - 25 June 1940.
- 17th Light Infantry Division. Formed 31 May 1940 in the Department of Creuse (La Courtine) from unit remnants of the Battle of the Meuse, primarily the 18th DI. Division had two regiments of infantry and one of artillery (two 75-mm battalions) but only eight antitank guns and with serious shortages in mortars and signals equipment. Campaigns: Battle of the Somme and the Retreat of the Left Wing. Had four battalions captured between 20 and 27 June. Final command post was at Saint-Hilaire-du-Maine. Subordination: IV Corps of the 10th Army from 7–11 June and then Group Duffour of the 10th Army until capitulation.
- 59th Light Infantry Division. Formed 30 May 1940 west of Saint-Mihiel from the 17th DI, itself formed from remnants of the 55th DI and 71st DI. Division had two regiments of infantry and one of artillery along with some antitank and anti-aircraft assets. Campaigns: Retreat of the center. Division assumed defensive position along the western edges of the Argonne and Belval Forests and was then overwhelmed by German tank and artillery attacks before being forced to surrender on 13 June 1940 south of Montmirail. Final command post at Bannes. Subordination: 2nd Army (to 12 June) and VII Corps of the 6th Army.
- 235th Light Infantry Division. Formed 1 June 1940 at Bar-sur-Aube with a heavy proportion of service troops. Division had two regiments of infantry and one of artillery but was short on 25-mm and 47-mm antitank cannon. Campaigns: Battle of the Aisne and the Retreat of the center. Attacks by Germans effectively dispersed the division by 12 June; elements managed to withdraw south before coming apart by 16 June. Final command post at a farm six kilometers E of Méry-sur-Seine. Subordination: XXIII Corps of the 4th Army until 12 June, then under direction of the 2nd DI.
- 236th Light Infantry Division. Formed 8 June 1940 at Courances from elements of the 102nd DIF, 22nd DI and 9th DIM. Campaigns: Retreat of the Left Wing. Merged with the 237th DLI on 25 June 1940. Final command post at Cunèges, east of Bordeaux. Subordination: 10th Army.
- 237th Light Infantry Division. Formed 27 May 1940 at Bazoches-sur-Guyonne from elements of the 5th DIM and the 55th DI. Campaigns: Retreat of the Left Wing. Division disbanded 7 July 1940. Final command post at Pellegrue, east of Bordeaux. Subordination: III Corps of the 10th Army.
- 238th Light Infantry Division. Formed 1 June 1940 at Arc-en-Barrois with two infantry regiments and an artillery regiment but lacking 25-mm antitank guns. Campaigns: Battle of the Aisne and Retreat of the center. Division disbanded 11 July 1940. Final command post at Bersac, northeast of Limoges. Subordination: XVII Corps of the 6th Army.
- 239th Light Infantry Division. Formed 1 June 1940 at Rolampont from various battalions. Extremely poor state of equipment. Campaigns: Battle of the Aisne and Retreat of the center. Division disbanded 11 July 1940. Final command post at Saint-Mathieu, southwest of Limoges. Subordination: 7th Army and XXIV Corps until 21 June, at which point the division was transferred to the I Corps.
- 240th Light Infantry Division. Formed 14 June 1940 at Bar-sur-Seine from training units; division had a 40% shortage of personnel. Campaigns: Retreat of the center. Division captured on 17 June. Final command post at Laignes, between Troyes and Dijon. Subordination: XVIII Corps.
- 241st Light Infantry Division. Formed 27 May 1940 at Louviers from elements of the 61st DI and reinforcements from the interior. Campaigns: Battle of the Somme, Battle of the Center and Retreat of the center. Division disbanded on 11 July 1940. Final command post at Cadouin, east of Bergerac. Subordination: XXV Corps.
- Light Division Burtaire (DLB). Formed 8 June 1940 at Louppy-sur-Loison from Groupement Burtaire, itself formed from the Montmedy Fortified Sector on 25 May. Campaigns: Meuse Front and Retreat of the center. Captured on 23 June. Final command post in the Goviller forest. Subordination: XVIII Corps, 2nd Army and Groupement Dubuisson.

=== Provisional divisions formed from fortified sectors ===
- Besse March Division (DMB). Formed 13 June 1940 in Borny (2 kilometers E of Metz) from the Fortified Sector of Boulay. Campaigns: Retreat of the Right Wing. Most elements captured on 20 June. Final command post at Germonville, south of Nancy. Subordination: VI Corps of the 3rd Army.
- Chastanet March Division. Formed 13 June 1940 in Meisenthal from the Fortified Sector of Rohrbach. Campaigns: Retreat of the Right Wing. Elements surrendered on 24 June. Final command post at Col de la Charnaye, vicinity Val-et-Châtillon. Subordination: XLIII Fortress Corps.
- Poisot March Division (DMP). Formed 12 June 1940 vicinity Maizières-lès-Metz from the Fortified Sector of Thionville. Campaigns: Retreat of the Right Wing. Became part of the Besse March Division on 19 June. Final command post at Frolois. Subordination: VI Corps of the 3rd Army.
- Regard March Division. Formed 13 June 1940 at Walbourg from the Fortified Sector of Haguenau, had no 25-mm antitank guns. Campaigns: Retreat of the Right Wing. Elements captured or surrendered by 25 June. Final command post in Walbourg, north of Hagenau. Subordination: V Corps.
- Senselme March Division. Formed 13 June 1940 at Baerenthal from the Fortified Sector of the Vosges. Campaigns: Retreat of the Right Wing. Surrendered on 24 June. Final command post at Le Donon, in Vosges Mountains west of Strasbourg. Subordination: XLIII Fortress Corps.

== Vichy French divisions ==
=== Vichy French divisions in France, 1940–42 (DM) ===
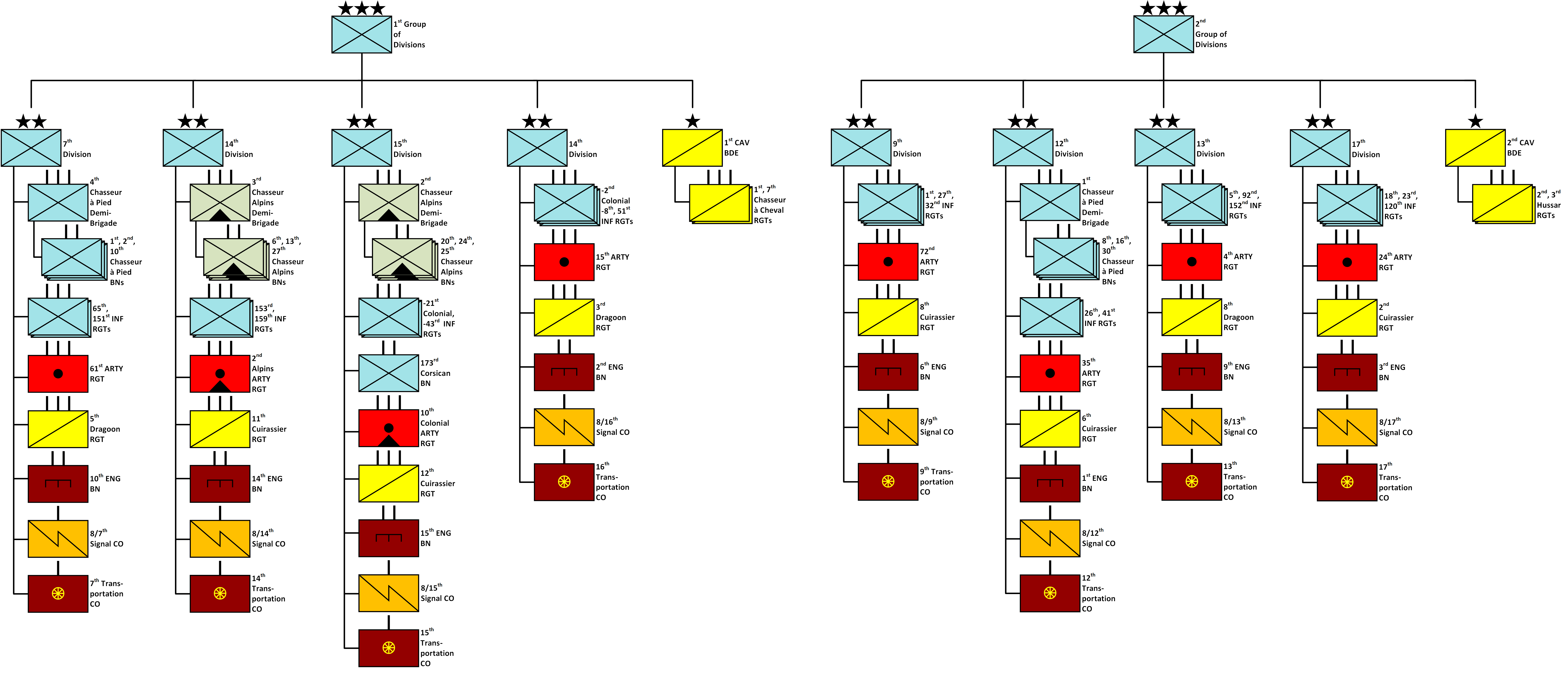
Organization of French Vichy forces in Metropolitan France in 1941

Also known as "the New Army;" or the Armistice Army. The terms of the Armistice of 22 June 1940 ensured the forces of Vichy France forces had only limited artillery and armored vehicles. Each division had three infantry regiments, a reconnaissance regiment of two battalions and an artillery regiment. When the Allies landed in north Africa, the Germans invaded Vichy France and the leadership of the Vichy French forces told the army to remain in its barracks rather than be massacred in the field. The Vichy Army was then disbanded by the Germans, although they authorized formation of one unit (1st Regiment of France) in early 1943. After the Allies landed in southern France, the 1st Regiment of France joined the Allied forces and formed the basis of several independent regiments which served in the 1944-45 campaign. Certain regiments of Vichy forces, carrying the numbers of 1940 units, were recreated in 1944–45 as part of the Army of Liberation.

- 7th Military Division. Headquartered in Bourg.
- 9th Military Division. Headquartered in Châteauroux.
- 12th Military Division. Headquartered in Limoges.
- 13th Military Division. Headquartered in Clermont-Ferrand.
- 14th Military Division. Headquartered in Lyon.
- 15th Military Division. Headquartered in Marseille.
- 16th Military Division. Headquartered in Montpellier.
- 17th Military Division. Headquartered in Toulouse.

=== Vichy French divisions in north Africa, 1941 ===
AKA "The Army of Transition"
French headquarters after 8 November 1942:

- CCFTAN (Commandement en chef des forces terrestres en Afrique du Nord)
- DCE (Détachement de Couverture français de l'Est algérien)
- DAE (Détachement d'Armée de couverture à l'Est - former DCE)
- DAF (Détachement d'Armée Française)
- 19th Army Corps (France)

Divisions:

- C.S.T.T. (Commandement Supérieur des Troupes de Tunisie - Tunisian Forces Command) Some battalions interned by the Germans when they arrived in Bizerte. Other elements formed a screen for the assembly of Allied forces in Tunisia and then was part of the Allied command until 31 January 1943. Remaining elements of command were then distributed to other French commands in north Africa. Campaigns: Start of field operations, Enlargement of the front in the direction of the Grand Dorsal, Initial operations in the Grand Dorsal, Enemy counter-offensive in the Grand Dorsal. Subordination: Varied but initially under the DCE/DAE, then under 1st British Army from 24 to 30 November 1942 and finally under the DAF until dissolution.
- Constantine Territorial Division (DTC). On 8 November 1942, certain units of this division were mobilized to become the Division de marche de Constantine (DMC) and the DTC ceased to exist.
- Algiers Territorial Division (DTA). Ceased to exist as units were mobilized from 15 to 20 November 1942 to form the Division de marche d'Alger (DMA).
- Oran Territorial Division (DTO). Battled U.S. 1st Infantry Division during Operation Torch from 8 to 11 November 1942, then provided units for combat in Tunisia from December 1942 which served under various commands until brought together and organized as the Division de marche d'Oran (DMO) on 1 May 1943.
- Fez Division. Contributed majority of units used to form the 2nd DIM on 1 May 1943.
- Meknes Division. Elements battled U.S. 9th Infantry Division during Operation Torch from 8 to 11 November 1942, then were formed as Division "A" on 18 November 1942, which became the Division de marche du Maroc (DMM) on 29 November and renamed again on 5 December as the 1st DMM. Contributed some units to formation of the 2nd DIM on 1 May 1943.
- Marrakech Division. Elements battled U.S. 9th Infantry Division during Operation Torch from 8 to 11 November 1942. Contributed units to the formation of the 4th DMM on 1 June 1943.
- Casablanca Division. Elements battled U.S. 3rd and 9th Infantry Divisions during Operation Torch from 8 to 11 November 1942. Contributed units to multiple formations but primarily the 4th DMM (1 June 1943) and the 9th DIC (16 July 1943).

== Divisions of Free France, the Tunisian Campaign and the Army of Liberation ==
=== Free French divisions ===
These two divisions were Gaullist formations that, while excellent performers in combat, had friction operating with other units of the French Army that they considered to have been tainted by affiliation with the Vichy regime. They were also treated as a special reserve by De Gaulle, who, at times, assigned them to military and political tasks in various areas of France to the frustration of General de Lattre, the 1st Army commander from 1944 to 1945.

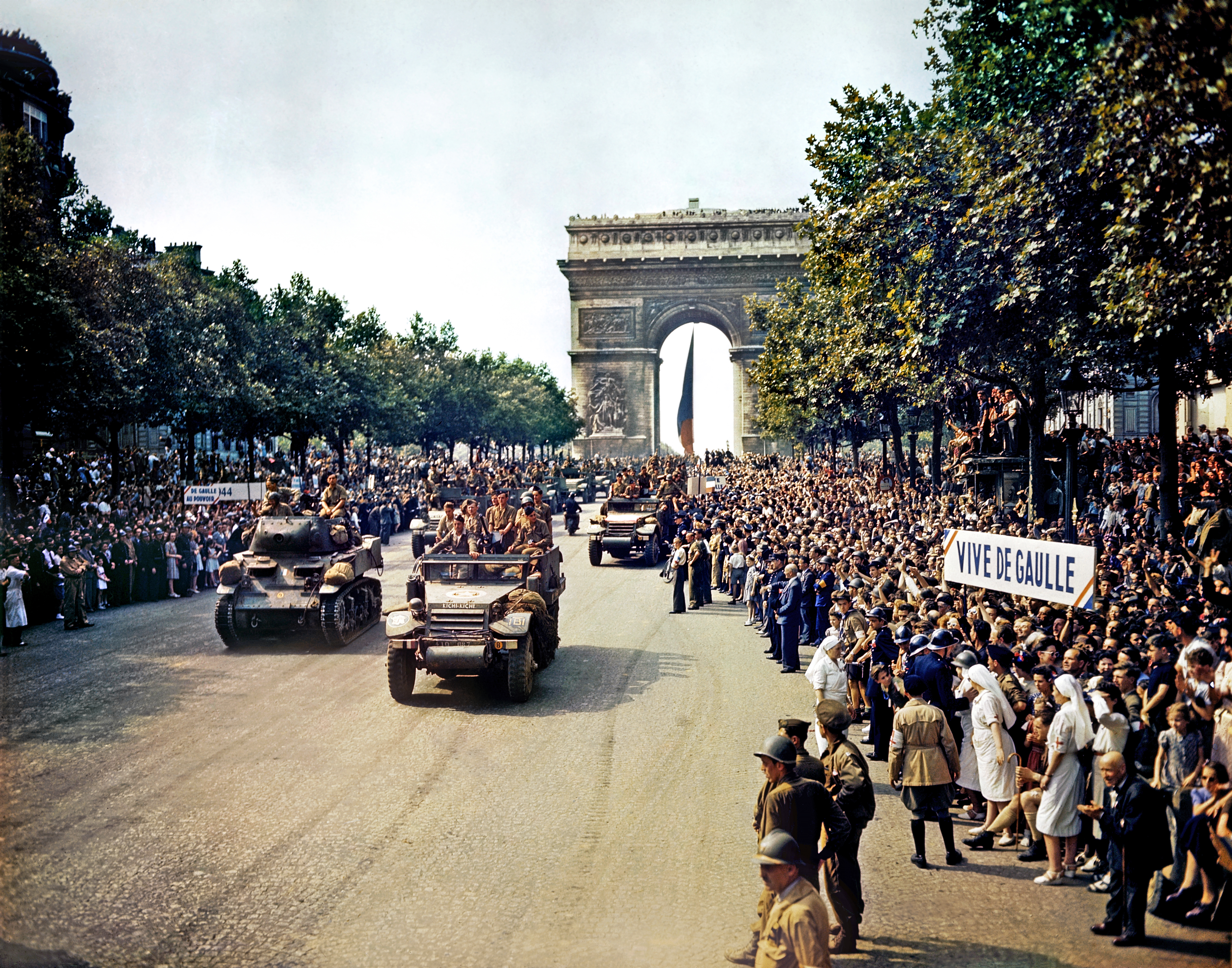
The 2nd DB parades in Paris, 1944

- 1st Free French Division (1st DFL, later became the 1st Motorized Infantry Division and finally the 1 March Infantry Division). Formed in Gambut, Libya, on 1 February 1943 from Free French units that had been fighting alongside British forces since 1940. Campaigns: Eastern Tunisia, Rome-Arno (including the Battle of Monte Cassino), Operations in Provence, Pursuit across the Rhône, Vosges Mountains, Alsace (including the Colmar Pocket) and the Alpine Front. Final command post vicinity Col de Tende in the Alps; forward elements approaching suburbs of Turin at war's end. Division moved to Paris 1 June 1945 and disbanded 15 August 1945. Subordination: Multiple, including British 8th Army, French 1st Army and Detachment of the Army of the Alps.
- 2nd Armoured Division (2nd DB, former 2nd Light Division). Formed in August 1943 from Leclerc's Column after the Allied victory in Tunisia, the 2nd DB was sent to Great Britain and entered France after D-Day. The division liberated Paris and later forced the Saverne Gap, breaking through German defenses in Lorraine and liberating Strasbourg. The 2nd DB was stationed in Paris by De Gaulle for a short period after the city's liberation to ensure the nearby presence of loyal troops (De Gaulle was concerned the French communists would challenge his assumption of power) while his government established itself. Campaigns: Normandy, Northern France, Alsace (including the Colmar Pocket), Royan and Bavaria. Final command post at Bad Reichenhall; division moved to Paris in late May 1945 and was inactivated on 31 March 1946. Subordination: U.S. 1st, 3rd and 7th Armies, French 1st Army and Detachment of the Army of the Atlantic.

=== March divisions in the Tunisian Campaign ===
The March divisions ("March" means provisional organizations without a formal tradition) were formed from French forces stationed in North Africa in November 1942, took part in the Tunisian Campaign and were all disbanded in mid-1943. The troops from these divisions were then used to form the 2nd DIM, 3rd DIA, 4th DMM, 9th DIC, 1st DB and 5th DB, all of which fought on the European continent until V-E Day.

- Constantine March Division (DMC). Formed 8 November 1942 from Army of Transition units at Constantine, Algeria. Campaigns: Battles of Faid, Enemy offensive at Faid, Allied counter-offensive at Faid, Kesra Sector, Battle of the Ousselat Massif. CG Marie Joseph Edmond Welvert killed when his vehicle struck a mine on 10 April 1943. Final command post at Kesra, Tunisia. Subordination: DAE until 24 November 1942, XIX Corps from 25 November until 17 January 1943, II U.S. Corps from 18 January until 27 February 1943, after which the division remained under the XIX Corps. Became 3rd DIA on 1 May 1943.
- Algerian March Division (DMA). Formed 14 November 1942 in Algiers. Campaigns: Occupation of the Dorsal, Battle of Fondouk-el-okbi, Battles of Karachoum and l'Ouechtatia, Battle of Ousselatia, Evacuation of the eastern Dorsal, Defense of the western Dorsal, Reoccupation of the eastern Dorsal, Pursuit to the northeast, Final victory. Final command post at Gaâfour, Tunisia. Became 1st DIA on 9 June 1943. Subordination: XIX Corps.
- 1st Moroccan March Division (1st DMM). Formed 5 December 1942 at Meknes, Morocco from the DMM, with a strength of 8,000 men. Campaigns: Push to the Dorsal, Enemy offensive, Allied counter-offensive, Final victory. Final command post at Zaghouan, Tunisia. Subordination: 18 November - 21 December 1942 under the Commandément Supérieur des Troupes du Maroc (CSTM), the CSTT from 22 December until 27 January 1943 and the XIX Corps from 28 January until 2 February, then the Corps d'Armée Française until 20 May 1943. Elements of the division returned to regional command in north Africa by 20 June 1943.
- Oran March Division (DMO). Formed 1 May 1943 in Henchir-ed-deba, Tunisia, from elements of the DTO that had been committed to combat in Tunisia from December 1942 forward. Campaigns: Drive to Sainte Marie du Zit. Final command post at Sainte-Marie du Zit (13 kilometers N of Zriba). Division returned to garrison by end of June 1943 and elements were used to form 8th DIA. Subordination: XIX Corps.
- Southeast Algerian Front (Front Sud-Est Algérien or FSEA). Formed 18 February 1943 from the brigade-sized Front Est Saharien, Task Force de l'Aurès and the remnants of the 3rd REI (Régiment d'étranger d'infanterie - Foreign Legion infantry regiment) at Batna, Algeria. Operated in eastern Algeria and western Tunisia with Allied forces. Final command post at M'Dilla, Tunisia. Subordination: CCFTAN until 1 March 1943, then placed under control of British 18th Army Group. Disbanded on 12 April 1943.

=== French North African divisions formed after the Tunisian Campaign ===
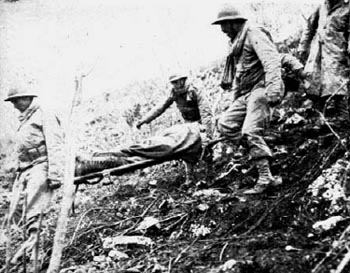
Moroccan troops in Italy, December 1943

- 1st Algerian Division (1st DA). Formed as the 1st DIA on 9 June 1943 and became the 7th DIA on 16 July 1943.
- 1st Colonial Division (1st DC). Envisioned by the Anfa Plan of January 1943 but formed as the 9th DIC on 16 July 1943.
- 1st Moroccan Division (1st DM). Envisioned by the Anfa Plan of January 1943 but formed as the 6th DIM on 16 July 1943.
- 2nd Algerian Division (2nd DA). Envisioned by the Anfa Plan of January 1943 but formed as the 8th DIA on 16 July 1943.
- 2nd Colonial Division (2nd DC). Envisioned by the Anfa Plan of January 1943 but formed as the 2nd DIC on 16 July 1943.
- 2nd Colonial Infantry Division (2nd DIC). Formed 16 July 1943 in Senegal, later sent to Morocco and became the 10th DIC on 24 August.
- 2nd Moroccan Division (2nd DM). Envisioned by the Anfa Plan of January 1943 but formed as the 2nd DIM on 1 May 1943.
- 2nd Moroccan Infantry Division (2nd DIM). Formed 1 May 1943 in Meknes, Morocco (former Meknes Division). Campaigns: Naples-Foggia, Rome-Arno (including the Battle of Monte Cassino), Operations in Provence, Pursuit across the Rhône, Vosges Mountains, Alsace (including the Colmar Pocket), Karlsruhe-Ulm Offensive and Bavaria. Division completed the war in Austria at Arlberg. Final command post at Immenstadt; division returned to France in late October 1945 and was stationed in Alsace and Lorraine. Subordination: French Expeditionary Corps; I and II Corps of the 1st Army.
- 3rd Algerian Division (3rd DA). Envisioned by the Anfa Plan of January 1943 but formed as the 3rd DIA on 1 May 1943.
- 3rd Algerian Infantry Division (3rd DIA). Formed 1 May 1943 in Constantine, constituent units came mainly from those that had served in the DMC prior to its dissolution. Campaigns: Rome-Arno (including the Battle of Monte Cassino), Operations in Provence (including the liberation of Marseille), Pursuit across the Rhône, Vosges Mountains, Alsace (including the Gambsheim Bridgehead and the assault on the Westwall) and the Karlsruhe-Ulm Offensive. Division completed war in Germany; later disbanded to create two infantry task forces in March 1946. Final command post at Stuttgart. Subordination: French Expeditionary Corps; I and II Corps of the 1st Army.
- 3rd Moroccan Division (3rd DM). Former Marrakech Division, formed 1 March 1943 and became the 4th DMM on 1 June 1943.
- 4th Moroccan Mountain Division (4th DMM). Formed 1 June 1943 in Casablanca from the former 3rd DM. Campaigns: Corsica, Rome-Arno (including the Battle of Monte Cassino), Operations in Provence, Alpine Front, Alsace (including the Colmar Pocket), Rhine Front and the Black Forest. Division completed war in Austria; division disbanded in France in January 1946. Final command post at Feldkirch. Subordination: French Expeditionary Corps and I Corps.
- 6th Moroccan Infantry Division (6th DIM). Former Casablanca Division, formed 16 July 1943 and disbanded 15 September 1943 due to lack of trained specialists.
- 7th Algerian Infantry Division (7th DIA). Former DMA / 1st DIA, formed 16 July 1943, disbanded 15 August 1944 due to lack of trained specialists. Material transferred to the 1st DFL.
- 8th Algerian Infantry Division (8th DIA). Former DMO, formed 16 July 1943, disbanded 11 January 1944 due to lack of trained specialists.
- 9th Colonial Infantry Division (9th DIC). Formed 16 July 1943 in Mostaganem, Algeria. Campaigns: Elba, Operations in Provence, Pursuit across the Rhône, Belfort Gap, Alsace (including the Colmar Pocket), Rhine Front and the Black Forest. Division completed the war in Germany, returned to France in September 1945 and embarked starting 12 October 1945 from Marseille for French Indochina. Final command post at Tuttlingen. Subordination: XIX, I and II Corps, as well as Army B.
- 10th Colonial Infantry Division (10th DIC). Former 2nd DIC, formed 24 August 1943 and disbanded 15 January 1944 due to lack of trained specialists.
- 1st Armoured Division (1st DB). Created 1 May 1943 in Mascara, Algeria from the Brigade légère mécanique. Campaigns: Operations in Provence, Pursuit across the Rhône, Vosges Mountains, Alsace and Southwestern Germany. Final command post at Biberach an der Riss. Division inactivated 31 March 1946. Subordination: II Corps from 15 August to 27 October 1944, shortly thereafter transferred to I Corps.
- 3rd Armoured Division. Created 1 September 1943 in Tunisia and subsequently moved to Morocco. Disbanded 31 August 1944, did not see combat. Later recreated in May 1945.
- 5th Armoured Division (5th DB). Created as the 2nd DB on 1 May 1943 in Rabat, Morocco; became the 5th DB on 16 July as the more senior unit designation was awarded to LeClerc's division. Division landed in Marseille from 19 September until 1 October 1944. Campaigns: Vosges Mountains, Alsace and Southwestern Germany. Division normally fought as three separate combat commands supporting infantry units of the French First Army. Final command post at Bludenz, Austria. Division remained in Germany as an occupation unit. Subordination: Mostly under II Corps but also I Corps and U.S. VI and XXI Corps.

=== Divisions formed in France 1944–45 ===
Organized with liberated manpower in 1944–45 and often assigned designations that had belonged to divisions in 1940. The two DCEO divisions were intended for use in Indochina to reassert French authority after the defeat of Japan.

Infantry Division	(Re)created		Campaigns	At war's end in	Disbanded	Subordination
19th	6 September 1944 (from FFI elements)	_	Besieged German-held ports of Lorient and Quiberon	western France	31 Jan. 1946	Detachment of the Army of the Atlantic
1st Alpine	25 August 1944 (from FFI elements in the Alps)	_	Alpine Front	_	Nov. 1944 (used to recreate the 27th Alpine Inf. Div.)	Sector of the Alps
10th	1 October 1944 (in the vicinity of Paris)	Subordinated to 1st Army, 6 January – 9 February 1945 and operated vicinity Vecoux. Thereafter transferred the Atlantic coast	Colmar Pocket and siege of German-held pockets on the Atlantic coast	western France	30 April 1946	1st Army and the Detachment of the Army of the Atlantic
27th Alpine	16 November 1944 (from elements of the 1st Alpine Infantry Division)	_	Alpine Front	Mont Cenis	15 April 1946	Sector of the Alps and the Detachment of the Army of the Alps
23rd	22 January 1945 (from FFI elements)	_	Royan Pocket, Siege of La Rochelle and assault of Ile d'Oleron	La Rochelle	30 Nov. 1945	Detachment of the Army of the Atlantic
1st	1 February 1945 (in western and northern France)	Subordinated to 1st Army on 24 April 1945 and served in lines-of-communication security role	Karlsruhe-Ulm Offensive	Riedlingen	30 April 1946	II Corps of the 1st Army
36th	15 February 1945 (from liberated manpower in Bordeaux and Toulouse)	_	None, division saw no combat before the war ended.	French Alps near the coast	31 Jan. 1946	French High Command
14th	16 February 1945 (in Alsace)	Commenced operations on 20 March 1945 near Buhl	Rhine Front and Black Forest	Donaueschingen	30 April 1946	I and II Corps of 1st Army
25th	1 April 1945 (from FFI elements)	Division reformed as 25th Airborne Division on 1 February 1946; later restructured as three task forces	Saint-Nazaire Pocket	Saint-Nazaire	8 June 1948	Detachment of the Army of the Atlantic
3rd Colonial (3rd DIC)	August 1945 (formerly 1st DCEO)	Fought postwar in Indochina with the CEFEO	_	_	_	_

==== Other divisions ====
Division	(Re)created		Subordination
1st Far East Colonial (DCEO)	16 Nov. 1944 (southern France)	Organized along the lines of a U.S. Marine Division. Campaigns: Elements saw combat in the Alps at war's end. Division disbanded and elements contributed to the formation of the 3rd Colonial Infantry Division on 14 August 1945. Division completed war in southern France.	French High Command
2nd Far East Colonial	1 Dec. 1944 (south. France)	Campaigns: None, division was disbanded on 15 June 1945 and elements used to form the 3rd Colonial Infantry Division in August 1945. Division completed war in southern France.	French High Command
3rd Armored	1 May 1945 (south. France)	Campaigns: None. Disbanded 18 April 1946.	French High Command

== See also ==
- Free French Forces
- Order of battle for the Battle of France
