= Saint-Pardoux =

Saint-Pardoux may refer to the following places in France:

- Saint-Pardoux, Deux-Sèvres, a commune in the Deux-Sèvres department
- Saint-Pardoux, Haute-Vienne, a commune in the Haute-Vienne department
- Saint-Pardoux, Puy-de-Dôme, a commune in the Puy-de-Dôme department
- Saint-Pardoux-de-Drône, a commune of the Dordogne department
- Saint-Pardoux-et-Vielvic, a commune of the Dordogne department
- Saint-Pardoux-la-Rivière, a commune of the Dordogne department
