= Saint-Jean-le-Blanc =

Saint-Jean-le-Blanc is the name of two communes in France:

- Saint-Jean-le-Blanc, Calvados, in the Calvados département
- Saint-Jean-le-Blanc, Loiret, in the Loiret département
