= Lassy, Calvados =

Lassy
- Part of Terres de Druance
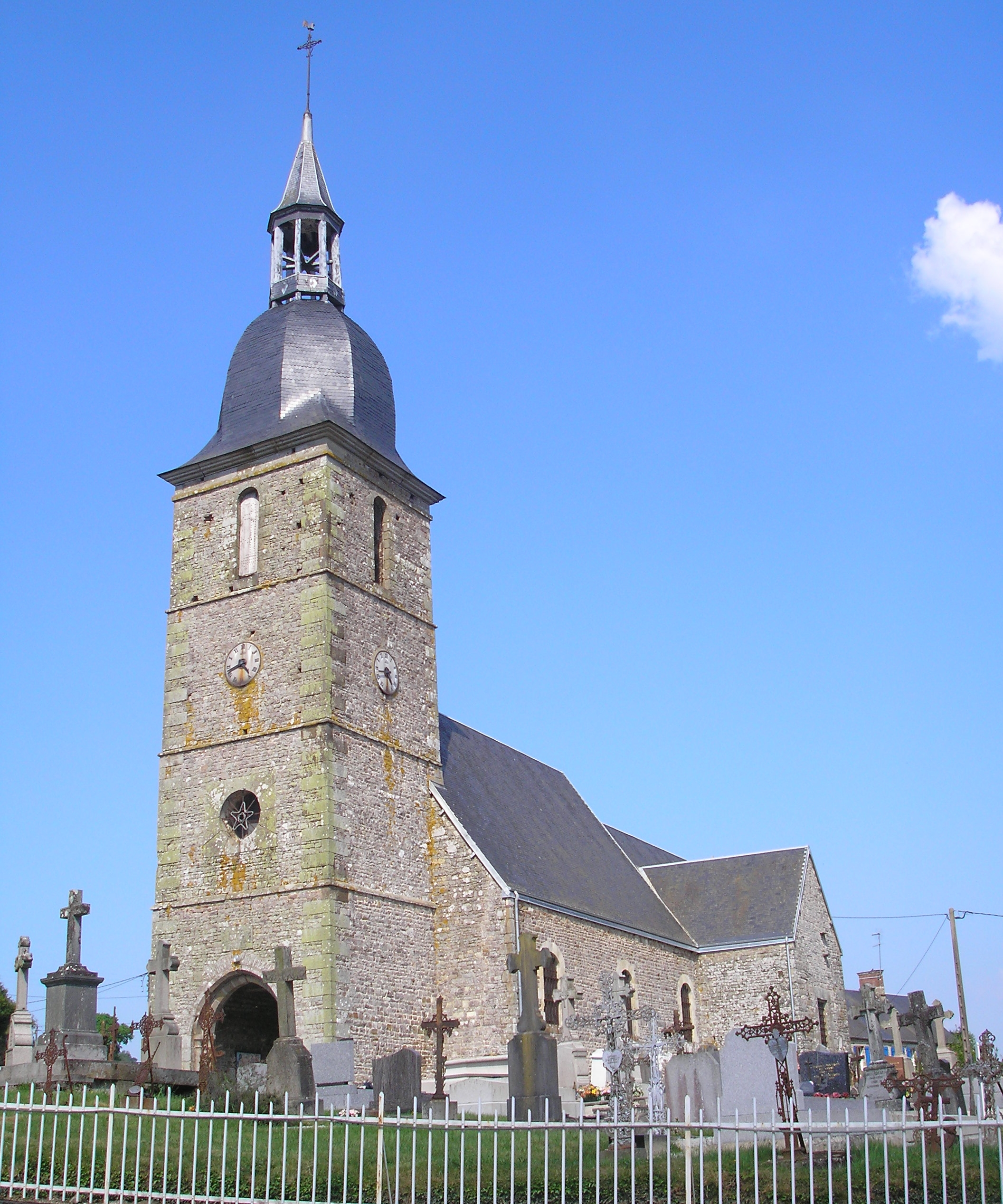
- Location of Lassy
- Location within France Location within Normandy
- Coordinates: 48°54′56″N 0°40′34″W
- Country: France
- Region: Normandy
- Department: Calvados
- Arrondissement: Vire
- Canton: Condé-en-Normandie
- Commune: Terres de Druance
- Area^{1}: 12.6 km^{2} (4.9 sq mi)
- Elevation: 200 m (660 ft)
- Highest elevation: 268 m (879 ft)
- Lowest elevation: 145 m (476 ft)
- Population (2023): 323
  - Density: 25.6/km^{2} (66.4/sq mi)
- Time zone: UTC+01:00 (CET)
  - Summer (DST): UTC+02:00 (CEST)
- Postal code: 14770
- ^{1} French Land Register data, which excludes lakes, ponds, glaciers > 1 km^{2} (0.386 sq mi or 247 acres) and river estuaries.

Lassy (French pronunciation: [lasi]) is a former commune in the Calvados department in the Normandy region in northwestern France. On 1 January 2017, it was merged into the new commune Terres de Druance.

The former commune is part of the area known as Suisse Normande.

== See also ==
- Communes of the Calvados department
