= Roussac =

- Part of Saint-Pardoux-le-Lac
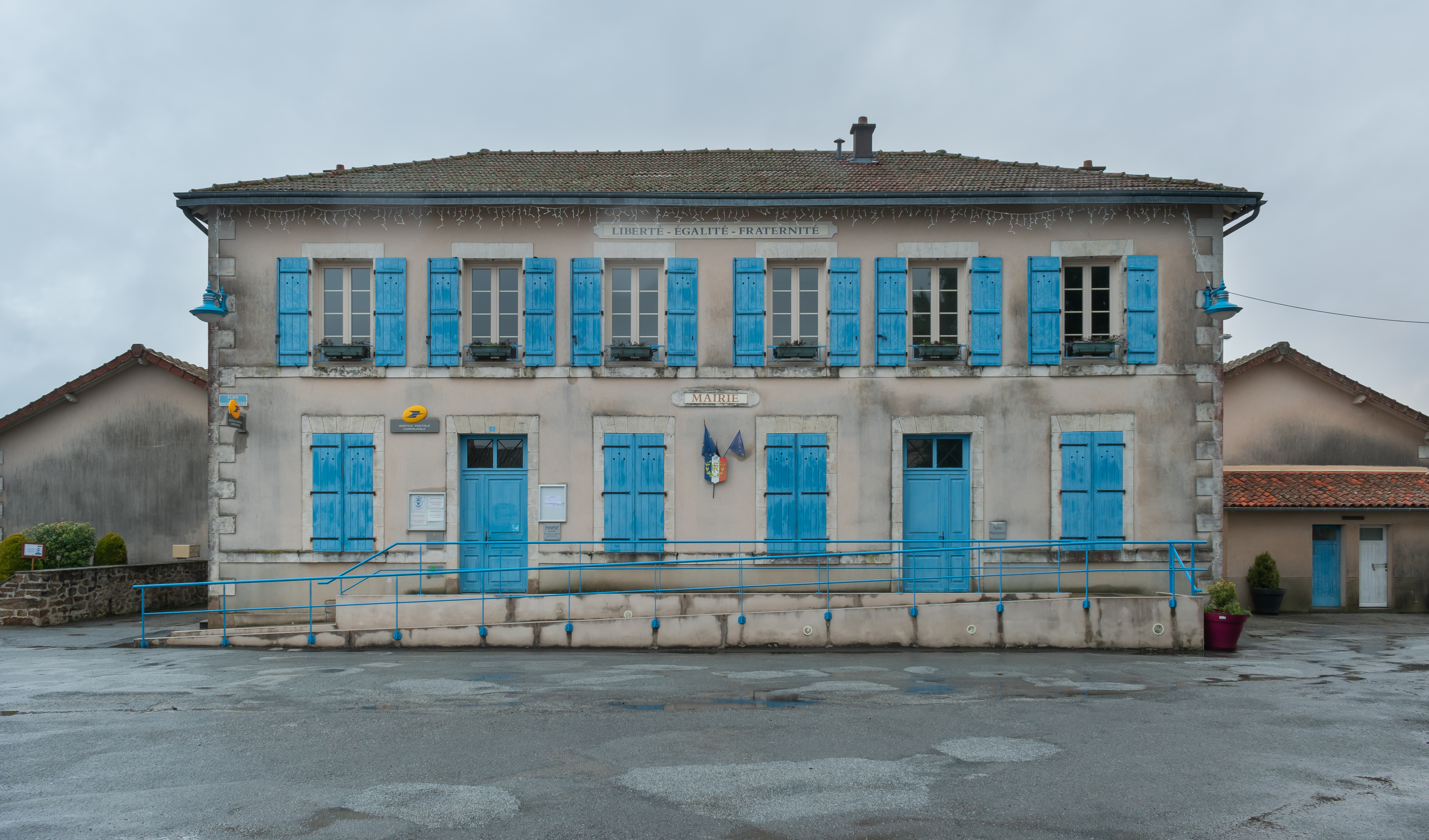
- Town hall in Roussac

- Coat of arms
- Location of Roussac
- Location within France Location within Nouvelle-Aquitaine
- Coordinates: 46°04′43″N 1°12′08″E
- Country: France
- Region: Nouvelle-Aquitaine
- Department: Haute-Vienne
- Arrondissement: Bellac
- Canton: Bellac
- Commune: Saint-Pardoux-le-Lac
- Area^{1}: 24.18 km^{2} (9.34 sq mi)
- Highest elevation: 413 m (1,355 ft)
- Lowest elevation: 265 m (869 ft)
- Population (2022): 447
  - Density: 18.5/km^{2} (47.9/sq mi)
- Time zone: UTC+01:00 (CET)
  - Summer (DST): UTC+02:00 (CEST)
- Postal code: 87140
- ^{1} French Land Register data, which excludes lakes, ponds, glaciers > 1 km^{2} (0.386 sq mi or 247 acres) and river estuaries.

Roussac (French pronunciation: [ʁusak]; Occitan: Rossac) is a former commune in the Haute-Vienne department in the Nouvelle-Aquitaine region in west-central France. On 1 January 2019, it was merged into the new commune Saint-Pardoux-le-Lac.

== See also ==
- Communes of the Haute-Vienne department
