= Saint-Pardoux-le-Lac =

- Commune
- Location of Saint-Pardoux-le-Lac
- Location within France Location within Nouvelle-Aquitaine
- Coordinates: 46°04′43″N 1°12′08″E
- Country: France
- Region: Nouvelle-Aquitaine
- Department: Haute-Vienne
- Arrondissement: Bellac
- Canton: Bellac
- Intercommunality: Gartempe - Saint Pardoux
- Area^{1}: 67.40 km^{2} (26.02 sq mi)
- Highest elevation: 533 m (1,749 ft)
- Lowest elevation: 265 m (869 ft)
- Population (2023): 1,381
  - Density: 20.49/km^{2} (53.07/sq mi)
- Time zone: UTC+01:00 (CET)
  - Summer (DST): UTC+02:00 (CEST)
- INSEE/Postal code: 87128 /87140
- ^{1} French Land Register data, which excludes lakes, ponds, glaciers > 1 km^{2} (0.386 sq mi or 247 acres) and river estuaries.

Saint-Pardoux-le-Lac (French pronunciation: [sɛ̃ paʁdu lə lak]; Limousin: Sent Perdos dau Lac) is a commune in the Haute-Vienne department in the Nouvelle-Aquitaine region in west-central France. It was established on 1 January 2019 by merger of the former communes of Roussac (the seat), Saint-Pardoux and Saint-Symphorien-sur-Couze.

== See also ==
- Communes of the Haute-Vienne department
