= Saint-Yrieix-la-Perche station =

Railway station in Saint-Yrieix-la-Perche, France

Coordinates: 45°31′09″N 1°12′19″E

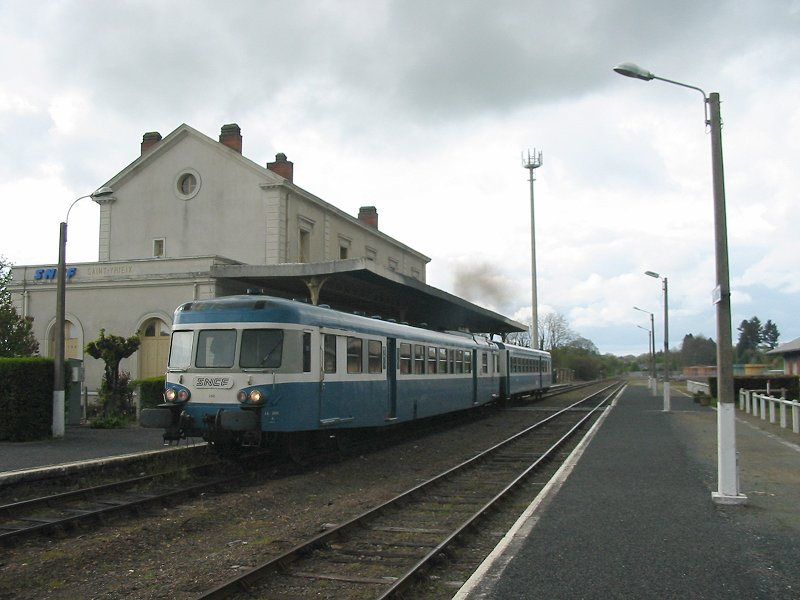

Saint-Yrieix-la-Perche is a railway station in Saint-Yrieix-la-Perche, Nouvelle-Aquitaine, France. The station is located on the Nexon–Brive railway line. The station is served by TER (local) services operated by SNCF.

== Train services ==
The following services currently call at Saint-Yrieix-la-Perche:

- local service (TER Nouvelle-Aquitaine) Limoges - Saint-Yrieix–Brive-la-Gaillarde

Preceding station	TER Nouvelle-Aquitaine	Following station
La Meyze towards Limoges	23	Coussac-Bonneval towards Brive-la-Gaillarde
