= Saint-Symphorien-sur-Couze =

- Part of Saint-Pardoux-le-Lac
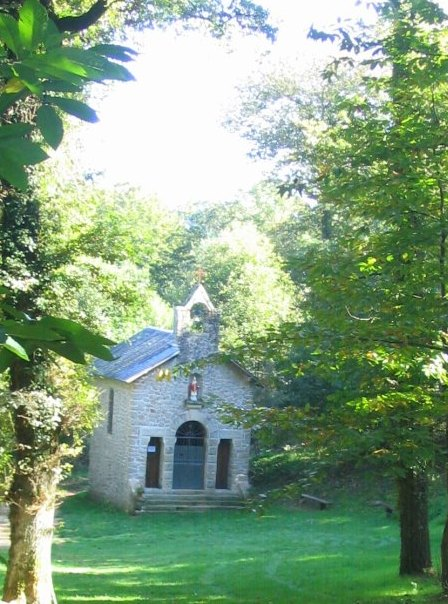
- The chapel of Saint Martin, in Saint-Symphorien-sur-Couze
- Location of Saint-Symphorien-sur-Couze
- Location within France Location within Nouvelle-Aquitaine
- Coordinates: 46°03′34″N 1°14′10″E
- Country: France
- Region: Nouvelle-Aquitaine
- Department: Haute-Vienne
- Arrondissement: Bellac
- Canton: Bellac
- Commune: Saint-Pardoux-le-Lac
- Area^{1}: 19.99 km^{2} (7.72 sq mi)
- Highest elevation: 443 m (1,453 ft)
- Lowest elevation: 305 m (1,001 ft)
- Population (2022): 249
  - Density: 12.5/km^{2} (32.3/sq mi)
- Time zone: UTC+01:00 (CET)
  - Summer (DST): UTC+02:00 (CEST)
- Postal code: 87140
- ^{1} French Land Register data, which excludes lakes, ponds, glaciers > 1 km^{2} (0.386 sq mi or 247 acres) and river estuaries.

Saint-Symphorien-sur-Couze (Occitan: Sent Aforian) is a former commune in the Haute-Vienne department in the Nouvelle-Aquitaine region in west-central France. On 1 January 2019, it was merged into the new commune Saint-Pardoux-le-Lac.

== See also ==
- Communes of the Haute-Vienne department
