= La Meyze station =

Railway station in La Meyze, France

Coordinates: 45°37′18″N 1°12′42″E

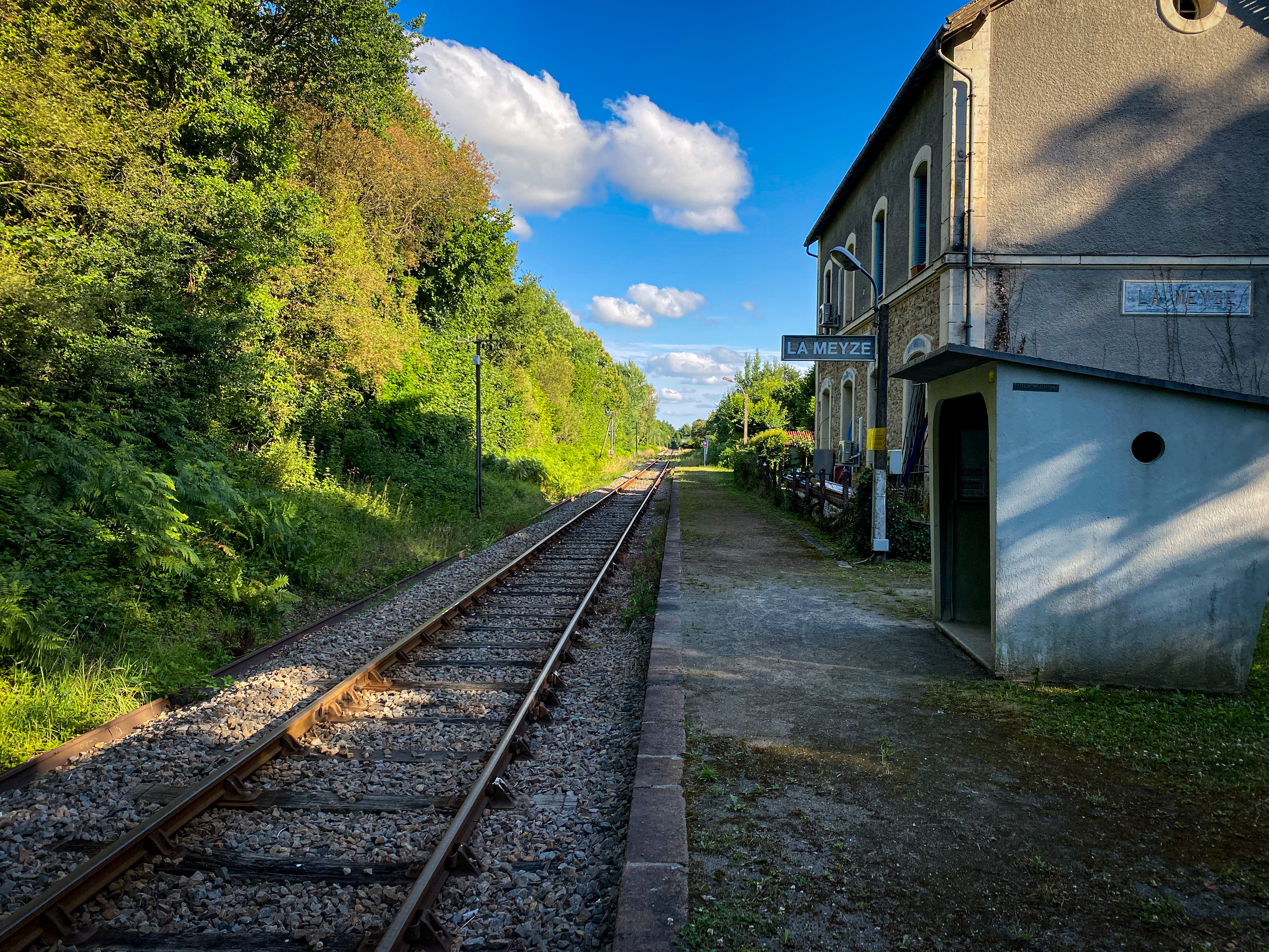
La Meyze Station

La Meyze is a railway station in La Meyze, Nouvelle-Aquitaine, France. The station is located on the Nexon - Brive railway line. The station is served by TER (local) services operated by SNCF.

== Train services ==
The following services currently call at La Meyze:

- local service (TER Nouvelle-Aquitaine) Limoges - Saint-Yrieix - Brive-la-Gaillarde

Preceding station	TER Nouvelle-Aquitaine	Following station
Nexon towards Limoges	23	Saint-Yrieix-la-Perche towards Brive-la-Gaillarde
