= Terres de Druance =

- Commune
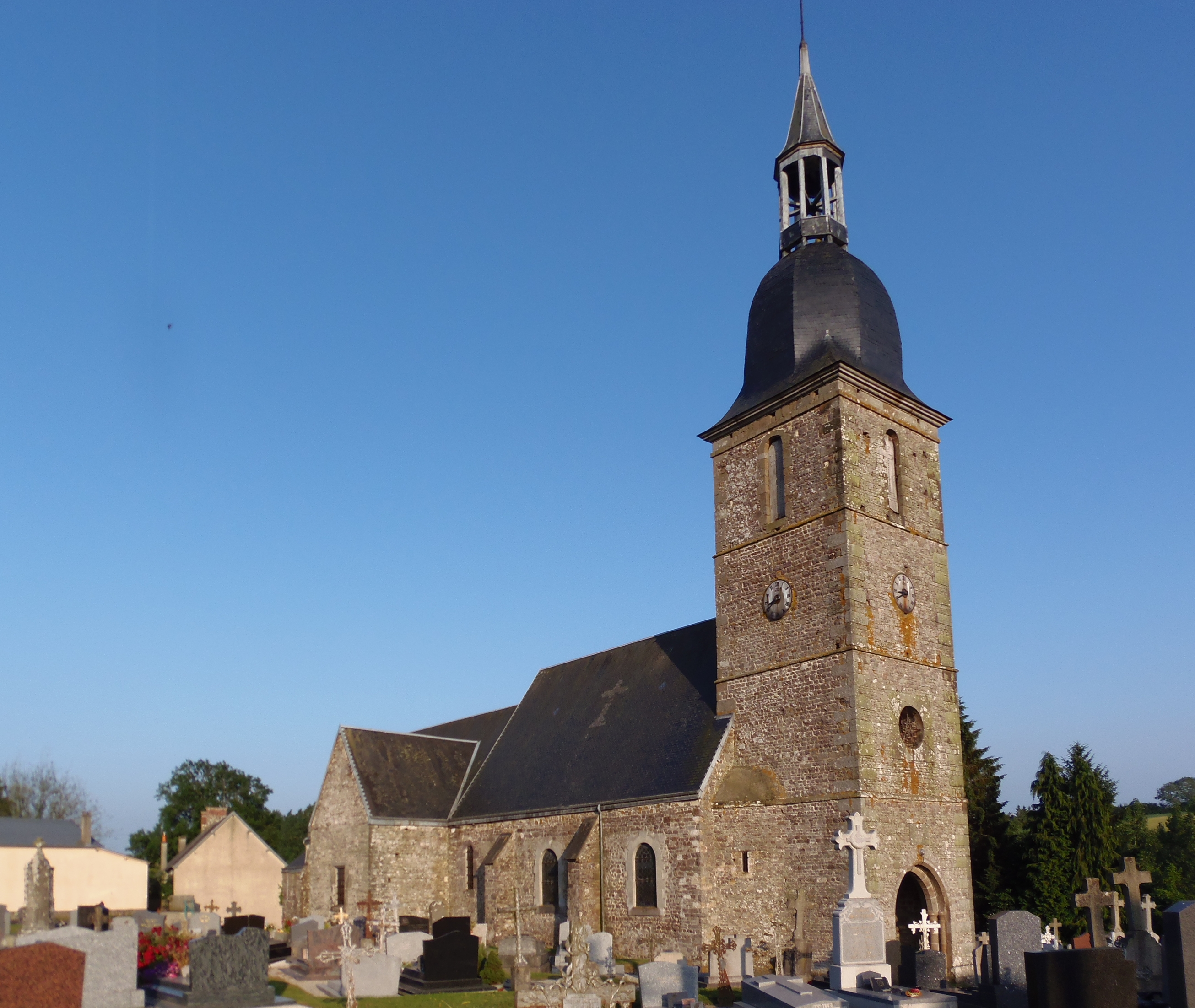
- The church in Lassy
- Location of Terres de Druance
- Location within France Location within Normandy
- Coordinates: 48°54′54″N 0°40′37″W
- Country: France
- Region: Normandy
- Department: Calvados
- Arrondissement: Vire
- Canton: Condé-en-Normandie
- Intercommunality: Intercom de la Vire au Noireau

Government
  - Mayor (2020–2026): Jean Turmel
- Area^{1}: 37.19 km^{2} (14.36 sq mi)
- Population (2023): 906
  - Density: 24.4/km^{2} (63.1/sq mi)
- Time zone: UTC+01:00 (CET)
  - Summer (DST): UTC+02:00 (CEST)
- INSEE/Postal code: 14357 /14770
- ^{1} French Land Register data, which excludes lakes, ponds, glaciers > 1 km^{2} (0.386 sq mi or 247 acres) and river estuaries.

Terres de Druance (French pronunciation: [tɛʁ də dʁyɑ̃s]) is a commune in the department of Calvados, northwestern France. The municipality was established on 1 January 2017 by merger of the former communes of Lassy (the seat), Saint-Jean-le-Blanc and Saint-Vigor-des-Mézerets.

== Geography ==
The commune is part of the area known as Suisse Normande.

The commune is made up of the following collection of villages and hamlets, Saint-Jean-le-Blanc, La Moissonnière, Gournay, Terres de Druance and Saint-Vigor-des-Mézerets.

The Commune along with another nine communes shares part of a 5,729 hectare, Natura 2000 conservation area, called the Bassin de la Druance.

The River Druance and four streams, The Pres Carreaux, The Parcs, The Vaux plus the Cresme are the five watercourses flowing through the commune.

== Points of Interest ==
=== National heritage sites ===
Eglise Saint-Vigor de Saint-Vigor-des-Mézerets is a fifteenth century Church that was classed as a Monument historique in 1928.

== See also ==
- Communes of the Calvados department
