= Soutiers =

Commune in Deux-Sèvres, France

- Part of Saint-Pardoux-Soutiers
- Location of Soutiers
- Location within France Location within Nouvelle-Aquitaine
- Coordinates: 46°34′15″N 0°16′40″W
- Country: France
- Region: Nouvelle-Aquitaine
- Department: Deux-Sèvres
- Arrondissement: Parthenay
- Canton: La Gâtine
- Commune: Saint-Pardoux-Soutiers
- Area^{1}: 5.43 km^{2} (2.10 sq mi)
- Elevation: 161 m (528 ft)
- Highest elevation: 208 m (682 ft)
- Lowest elevation: 142 m (466 ft)
- Population (2022): 264
  - Density: 48.6/km^{2} (126/sq mi)
- Time zone: UTC+01:00 (CET)
  - Summer (DST): UTC+02:00 (CEST)
- Postal code: 79310
- ^{1} French Land Register data, which excludes lakes, ponds, glaciers > 1 km^{2} (0.386 sq mi or 247 acres) and river estuaries.

Soutiers (French pronunciation: [sutje]) is a former commune in the Deux-Sèvres department in western France. On 1 January 2019, it was merged into the new commune Saint-Pardoux-Soutiers.

== See also ==
- Communes of the Deux-Sèvres department
