= Saint-Pardoux-Soutiers =

- Commune
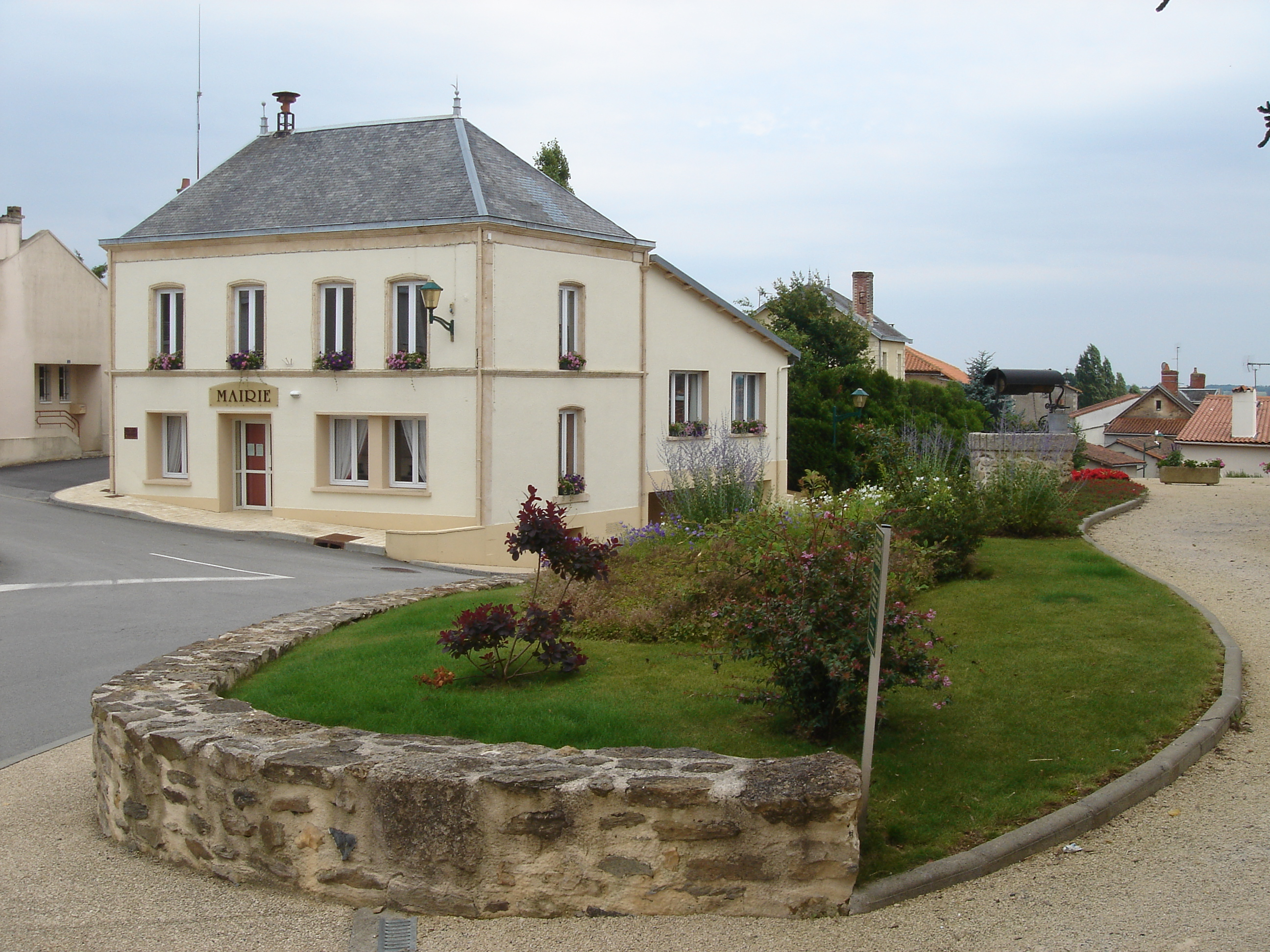
- Town hall
- Location of Saint-Pardoux-Soutiers
- Location within France Location within Nouvelle-Aquitaine
- Coordinates: 46°34′21″N 0°18′17″W
- Country: France
- Region: Nouvelle-Aquitaine
- Department: Deux-Sèvres
- Arrondissement: Parthenay
- Canton: La Gâtine
- Intercommunality: Val de Gâtine

Government
  - Mayor (2020–2026): Johann Baranger
- Area^{1}: 39.67 km^{2} (15.32 sq mi)
- Highest elevation: 232 m (761 ft)
- Lowest elevation: 142 m (466 ft)
- Population (2023): 1,869
  - Density: 47.11/km^{2} (122.0/sq mi)
- Time zone: UTC+01:00 (CET)
  - Summer (DST): UTC+02:00 (CEST)
- INSEE/Postal code: 79285 /79310
- ^{1} French Land Register data, which excludes lakes, ponds, glaciers > 1 km^{2} (0.386 sq mi or 247 acres) and river estuaries.

Saint-Pardoux-Soutiers (French pronunciation: [sɛ̃ paʁdu sutje]) is a commune in the Deux-Sèvres department in western France. It was established on 1 January 2019 by merger of the former communes of Saint-Pardoux (the seat) and Soutiers.

== See also ==
- Communes of the Deux-Sèvres department
