= Saint-Pardoux, Deux-Sèvres =

Saint-Pardoux
- Part of Saint-Pardoux-Soutiers
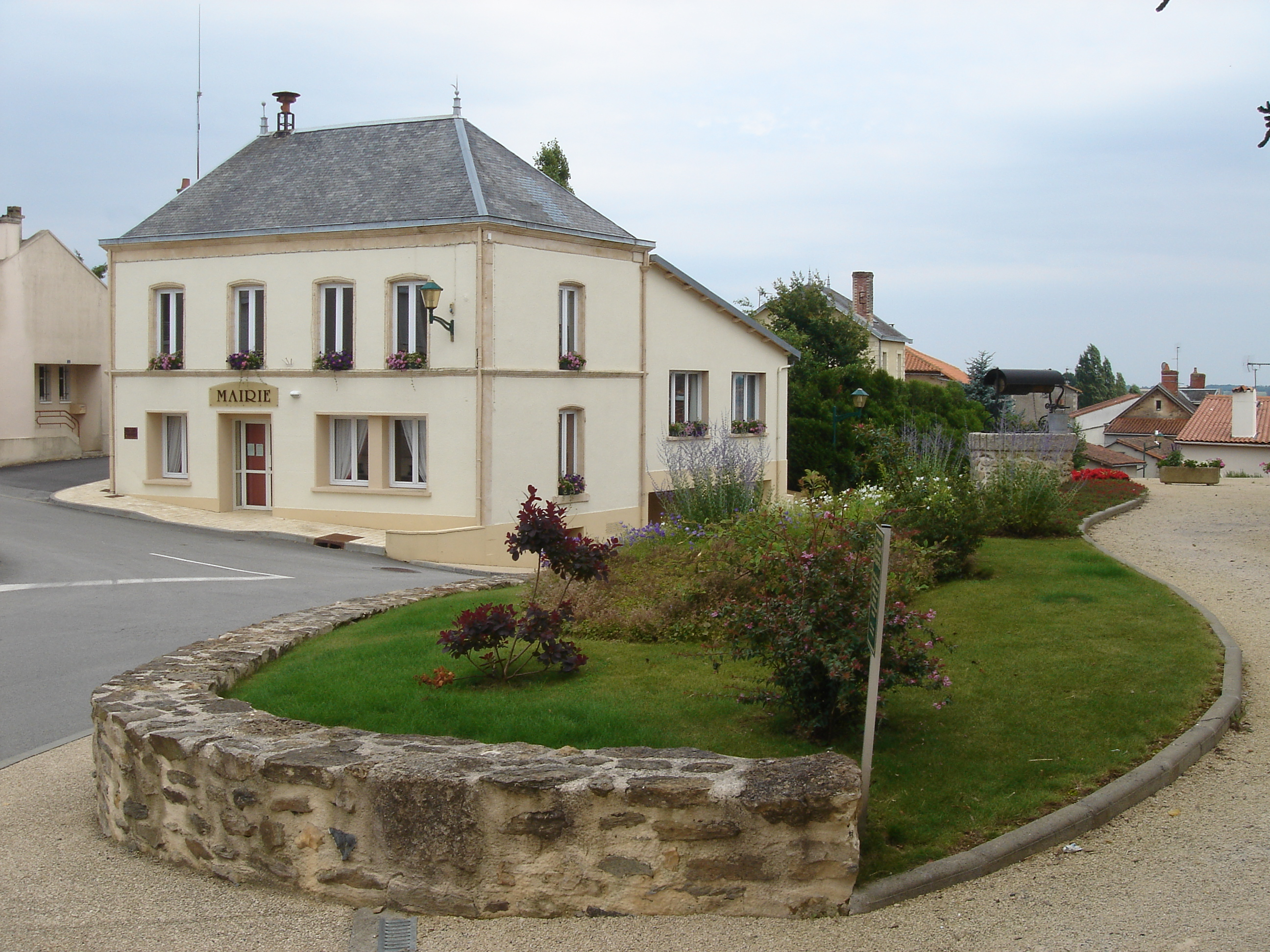
- Town hall of Saint-Pardoux
- Location of Saint-Pardoux
- Location within France Location within Nouvelle-Aquitaine
- Coordinates: 46°34′21″N 0°18′17″W
- Country: France
- Region: Nouvelle-Aquitaine
- Department: Deux-Sèvres
- Arrondissement: Parthenay
- Canton: La Gâtine
- Commune: Saint-Pardoux-Soutiers
- Area^{1}: 34.24 km^{2} (13.22 sq mi)
- Elevation: 232 m (761 ft)
- Highest elevation: 232 m (761 ft)
- Lowest elevation: 150 m (490 ft)
- Population (2022): 1,608
  - Density: 46.96/km^{2} (121.6/sq mi)
- Time zone: UTC+01:00 (CET)
  - Summer (DST): UTC+02:00 (CEST)
- Postal code: 79310
- ^{1} French Land Register data, which excludes lakes, ponds, glaciers > 1 km^{2} (0.386 sq mi or 247 acres) and river estuaries.

Saint-Pardoux (French pronunciation: [sɛ̃ paʁdu]) is a former commune in the Deux-Sèvres department in western France. On 1 January 2019, it was merged into the new commune Saint-Pardoux-Soutiers.

== See also ==
- Communes of the Deux-Sèvres department
