= Saint-Vigor-des-Mézerets =

- Part of Terres de Druance
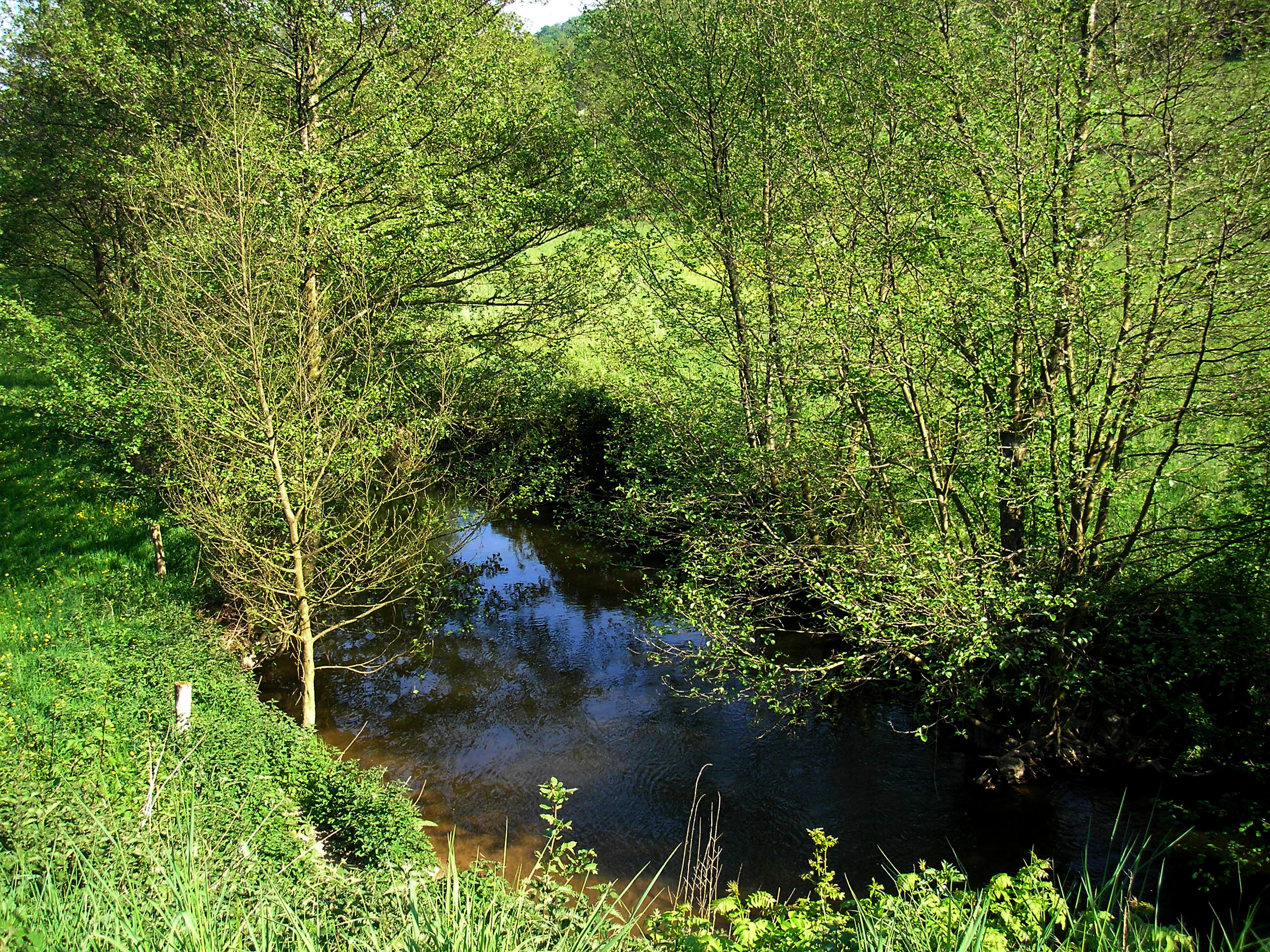
- The Druance
- Location of Saint-Vigor-des-Mézerets
- Location within France Location within Normandy
- Coordinates: 48°54′34″N 0°38′27″W
- Country: France
- Region: Normandy
- Department: Calvados
- Arrondissement: Vire
- Canton: Condé-en-Normandie
- Commune: Terres de Druance
- Area^{1}: 9.47 km^{2} (3.66 sq mi)
- Elevation: 194 m (636 ft)
- Highest elevation: 237 m (778 ft)
- Lowest elevation: 117 m (384 ft)
- Population (2023): 246
  - Density: 26.0/km^{2} (67.3/sq mi)
- Time zone: UTC+01:00 (CET)
  - Summer (DST): UTC+02:00 (CEST)
- Postal code: 14770
- ^{1} French Land Register data, which excludes lakes, ponds, glaciers > 1 km^{2} (0.386 sq mi or 247 acres) and river estuaries.

Saint-Vigor-des-Mézerets (French pronunciation: [sɛ̃ viɡɔʁ de mezʁɛ]) is a former commune in the Calvados department in the Normandy region in northwestern France. On 1 January 2017, it was merged into the new commune Terres de Druance.

The former commune is part of the area known as Suisse Normande.

== See also ==
- Communes of the Calvados department
