= Ochey =

- Commune
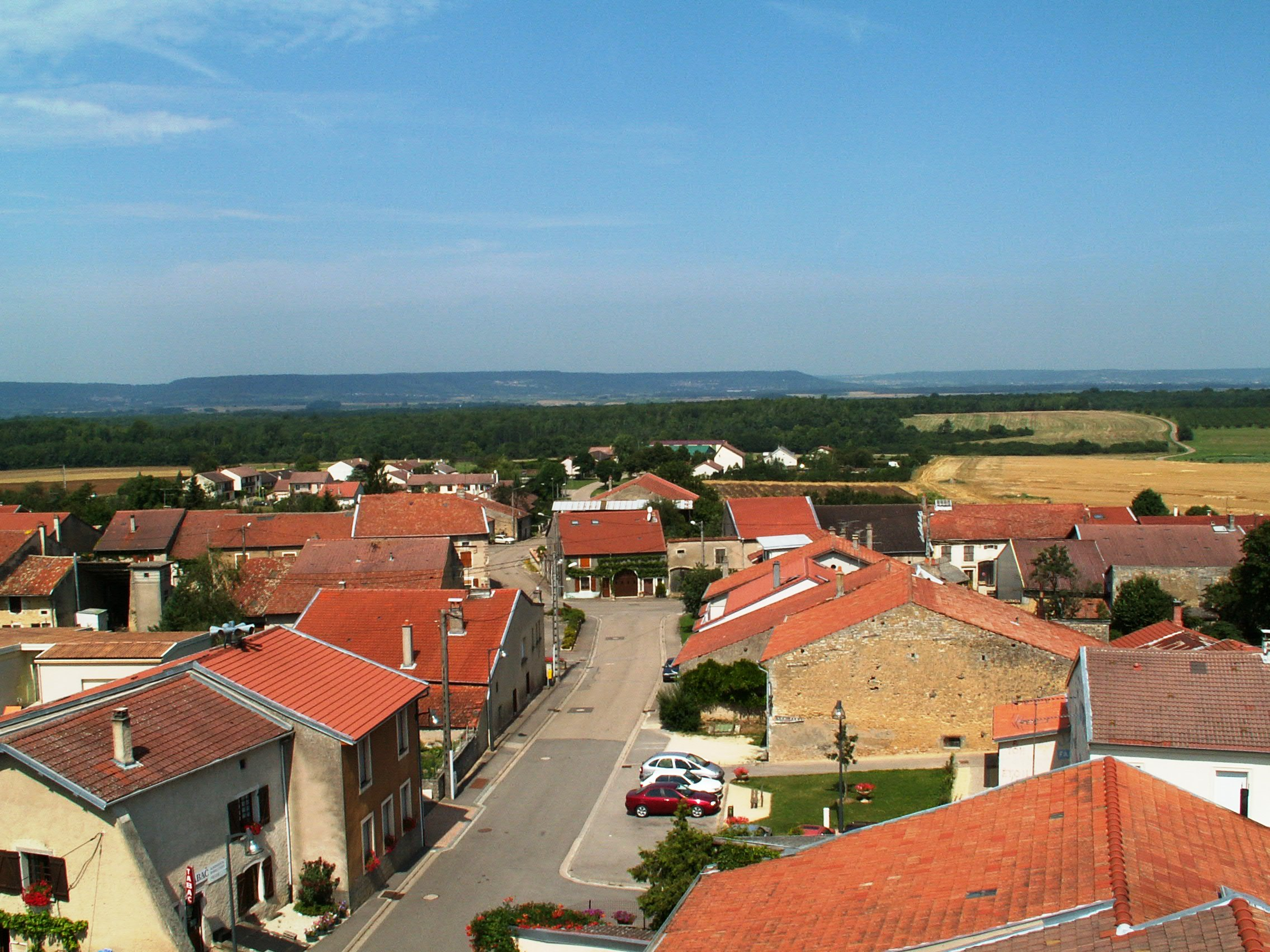
- A view within Ochey

- Coat of arms
- Location of Ochey
- Location within France Location within Grand Est
- Coordinates: 48°34′59″N 5°56′36″E
- Country: France
- Region: Grand Est
- Department: Meurthe-et-Moselle
- Arrondissement: Toul
- Canton: Meine au Saintois
- Intercommunality: CC Pays de Colombey et Sud Toulois

Government
  - Mayor (2020–2026): Philippe Parmentier
- Area^{1}: 18.06 km^{2} (6.97 sq mi)
- Elevation: 310 m (1,020 ft)
- Highest elevation: 345 m (1,132 ft)
- Lowest elevation: 234 m (768 ft)
- Population (2023): 518
  - Density: 28.7/km^{2} (74.3/sq mi)
- Time zone: UTC+01:00 (CET)
  - Summer (DST): UTC+02:00 (CEST)
- INSEE/Postal code: 54405 /54170
- ^{1} French Land Register data, which excludes lakes, ponds, glaciers > 1 km^{2} (0.386 sq mi or 247 acres) and river estuaries.

Ochey (French pronunciation: [ɔʃɛ]) is a commune in the Meurthe-et-Moselle department in north-eastern France.

== See also ==
- Communes of the Meurthe-et-Moselle department
- Nancy – Ochey Air Base
