= La Meyze =

- Commune
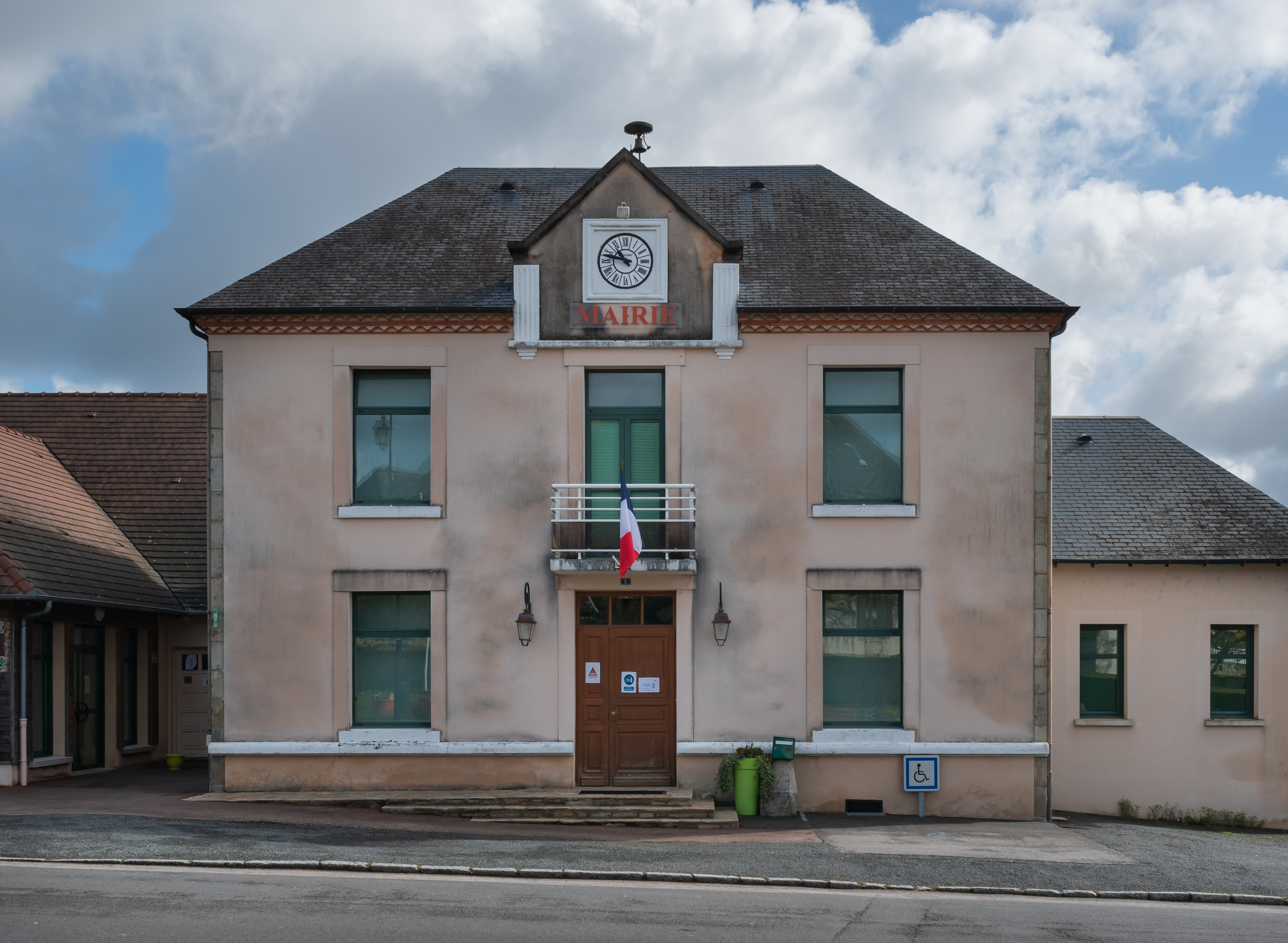
- Town hall of La Meyze

- Coat of arms
- Location of La Meyze
- Location within France Location within Nouvelle-Aquitaine
- Coordinates: 45°37′03″N 1°12′54″E
- Country: France
- Region: Nouvelle-Aquitaine
- Department: Haute-Vienne
- Arrondissement: Limoges
- Canton: Saint-Yrieix-la-Perche
- Intercommunality: Pays de Saint-Yrieix

Government
  - Mayor (2020–2026): Pierre Roux
- Area^{1}: 28.11 km^{2} (10.85 sq mi)
- Highest elevation: 411 m (1,348 ft)
- Lowest elevation: 315 m (1,033 ft)
- Population (2023): 842
  - Density: 30.0/km^{2} (77.6/sq mi)
- Time zone: UTC+01:00 (CET)
  - Summer (DST): UTC+02:00 (CEST)
- INSEE/Postal code: 87096 /87800
- ^{1} French Land Register data, which excludes lakes, ponds, glaciers > 1 km^{2} (0.386 sq mi or 247 acres) and river estuaries.

La Meyze (French pronunciation: [la mɛz]; Occitan: La Meisa) is a commune in the Haute-Vienne department in the Nouvelle-Aquitaine region in west-central France. La Meyze station has rail connections to Brive-la-Gaillarde and Limoges.

Inhabitants are known as Meyzais.

== See also ==
- Communes of the Haute-Vienne department
