= Saint-Jean-le-Blanc, Calvados =

Saint-Jean-le-Blanc
- Part of Terres de Druance
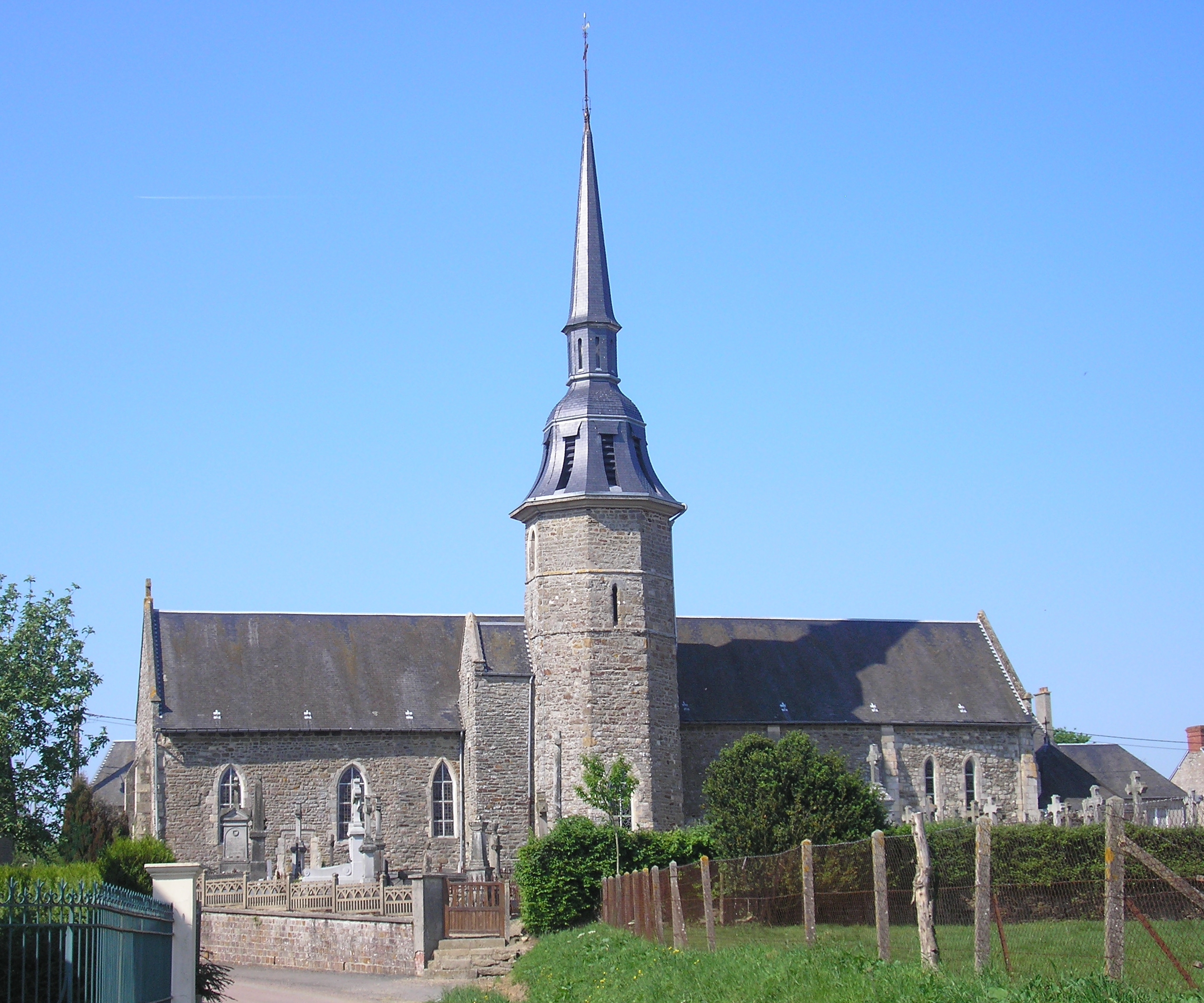
- Location of Saint-Jean-le-Blanc
- Location within France Location within Normandy
- Coordinates: 48°56′11″N 0°39′09″W
- Country: France
- Region: Normandy
- Department: Calvados
- Arrondissement: Vire
- Canton: Condé-en-Normandie
- Commune: Terres de Druance
- Area^{1}: 15.1 km^{2} (5.8 sq mi)
- Elevation: 223 m (732 ft)
- Highest elevation: 290 m (950 ft)
- Lowest elevation: 137 m (449 ft)
- Population (2023): 337
  - Density: 22.3/km^{2} (57.8/sq mi)
- Time zone: UTC+01:00 (CET)
  - Summer (DST): UTC+02:00 (CEST)
- Postal code: 14770
- ^{1} French Land Register data, which excludes lakes, ponds, glaciers > 1 km^{2} (0.386 sq mi or 247 acres) and river estuaries.

Saint-Jean-le-Blanc (French pronunciation: [sɛ̃ ʒɑ̃ lə blɑ̃]) is a former commune in the Calvados department in the Normandy region in northwestern France. On 1 January 2017, it was merged into the new commune Terres de Druance.

The former commune is part of the area known as Suisse Normande.

== See also ==
- Communes of the Calvados department
