= Saint-Pardoux, Haute-Vienne =

Saint-Pardoux
- Part of Saint-Pardoux-le-Lac
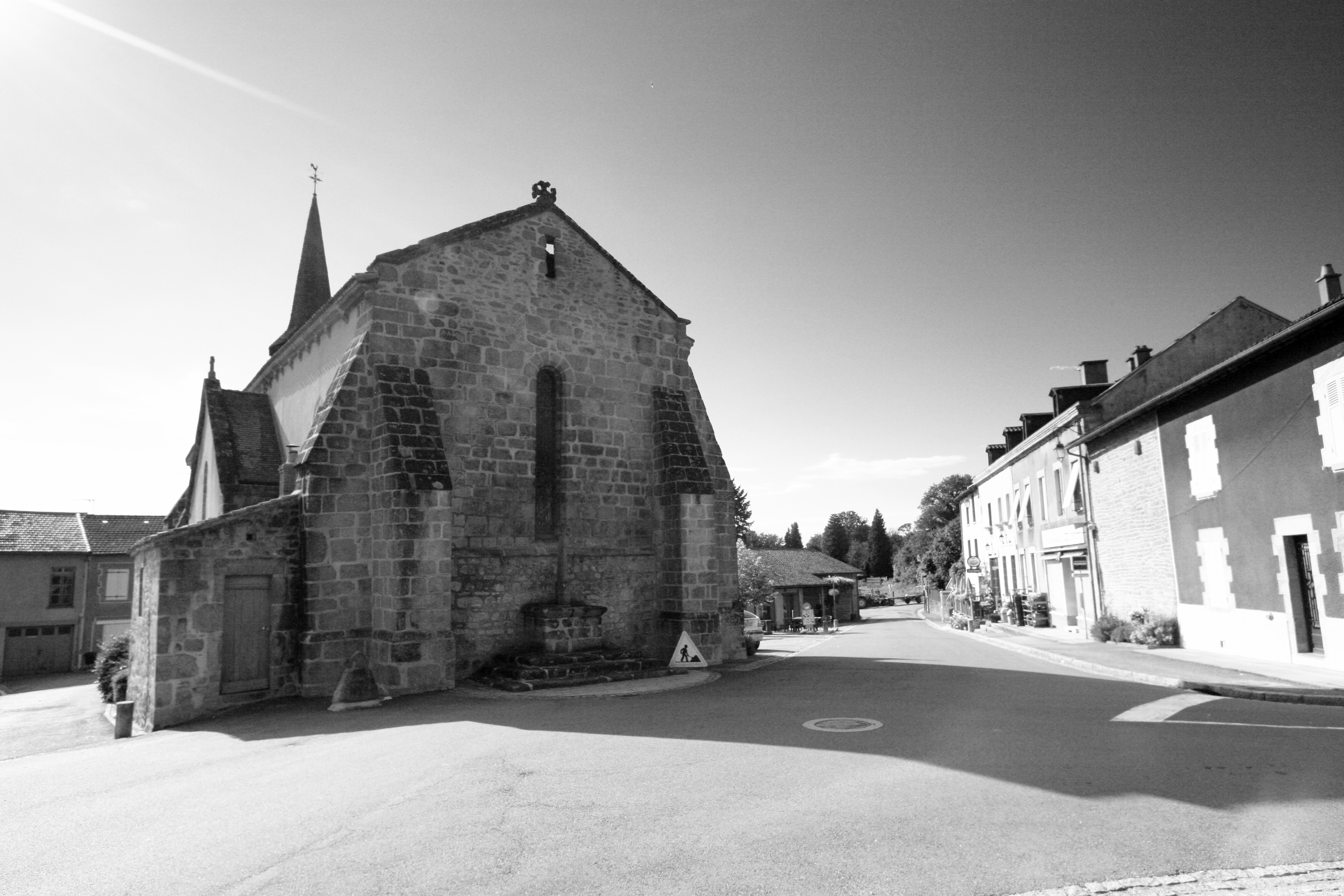
- The church in Saint-Pardoux

- Coat of arms
- Location of Saint-Pardoux
- Location within France Location within Nouvelle-Aquitaine
- Coordinates: 46°03′32″N 1°16′56″E
- Country: France
- Region: Nouvelle-Aquitaine
- Department: Haute-Vienne
- Arrondissement: Bellac
- Canton: Ambazac
- Commune: Saint-Pardoux-le-Lac
- Area^{1}: 23.23 km^{2} (8.97 sq mi)
- Highest elevation: 533 m (1,749 ft)
- Lowest elevation: 327 m (1,073 ft)
- Population (2022): 668
  - Density: 28.8/km^{2} (74.5/sq mi)
- Time zone: UTC+01:00 (CET)
  - Summer (DST): UTC+02:00 (CEST)
- Postal code: 87250
- ^{1} French Land Register data, which excludes lakes, ponds, glaciers > 1 km^{2} (0.386 sq mi or 247 acres) and river estuaries.

Saint-Pardoux (French pronunciation: [sɛ̃ paʁdu]; Limousin: Sent Perdos) is a former commune in the Haute-Vienne department in the Nouvelle-Aquitaine region in west-central France. On 1 January 2019, it was merged into the new commune Saint-Pardoux-le-Lac.

== See also ==
- Communes of the Haute-Vienne department
