= 2012 Tour de France, Prologue to Stage 10 =

Prologue to Stage 10 of the 2012 Tour de France

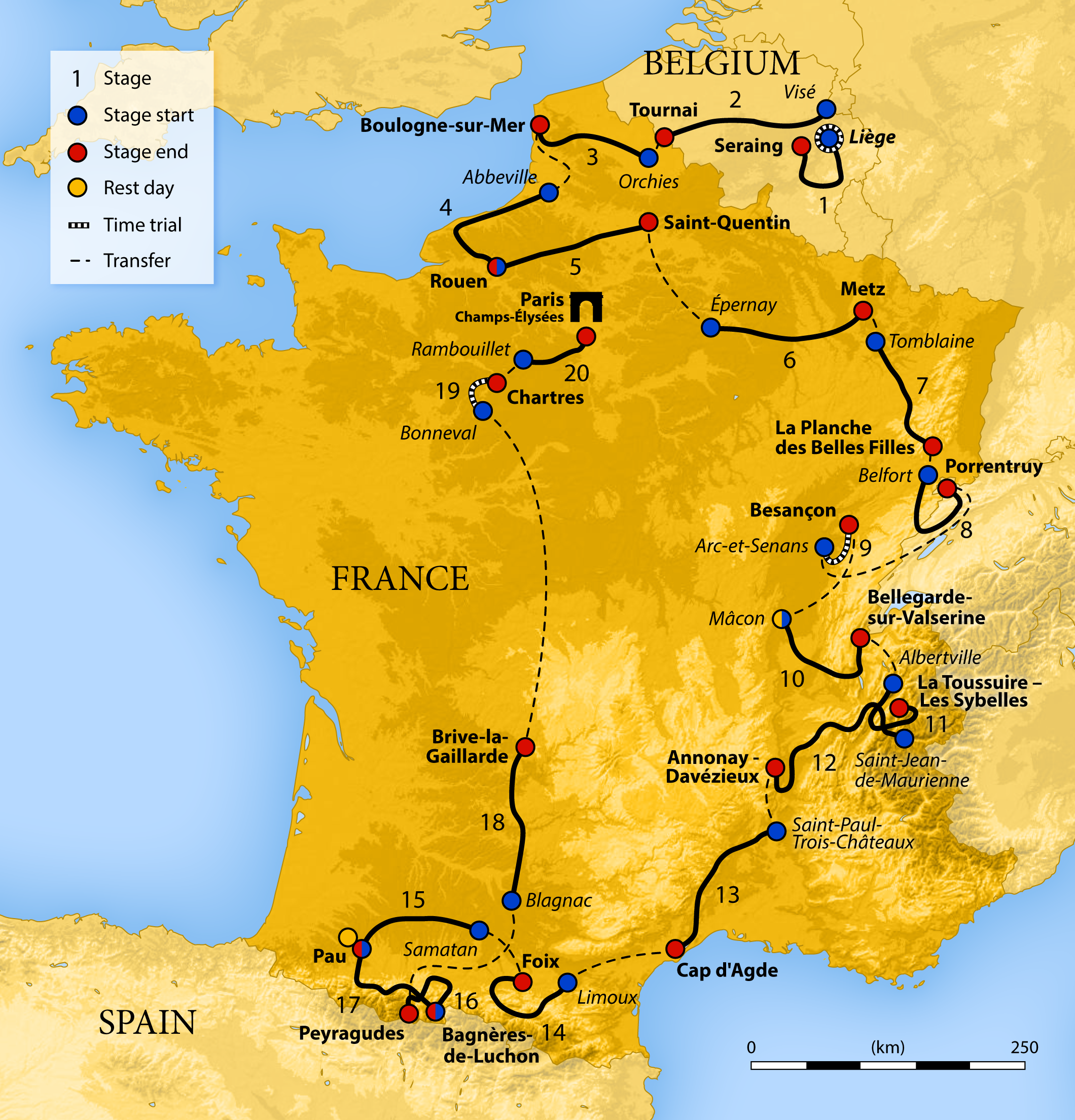
Overview of the stages; black lines represent distances covered in the individual stages, while dashed lines are the distances covered in transfers between the stages.

The 2012 Tour de France began on 30 June, and stage 10 occurred on 11 July. The 2012 edition began with a prologue – a short individual time trial stage – where each member of the starting peloton of 198 riders competed against the clock – in Liège, Belgium with two more stages held in the country before moving back into France. The race resumed in Orchies for the start of the third stage; also during the first half of the race, the peloton visited Switzerland for the finish to the eighth stage in Porrentruy, and contested another individual time trial stage – having returned to France – the following day.

Fabian Cancellara held the lead of the race throughout its opening Belgian leg; having won the race-commencing prologue, Cancellara defended it on the following two stages before the race returned to France. Cancellara maintained his overall lead for the rest of the race's first week, before eventually losing time on the first true mountain stage of the race – stage seven – as he was dropped on the closing climb to La Planche des Belles Filles. As a result, Bradley Wiggins assumed the maillot jaune, becoming the first British rider to wear the jersey since 2000. Wiggins maintained the lead for the following three stages, including his first victory at the Tour during the ninth stage individual time trial in Besançon. Wiggins held a lead of almost two minutes in the overall standings with the more mountainous second half of the Tour still to race. Two riders won multiple stages during the first half of the race; Peter Sagan, in his first Tour de France, won three stages and also held the lead of the points classification, while André Greipel took back-to-back stage victories on the fourth and fifth stages. World champion Mark Cavendish achieved one stage victory, while French riders Thibaut Pinot and Thomas Voeckler each took breakaway victories.

The race was also marked by several large crashes, most notably on the sixth stage, when the majority of the field crashed with around 25 km (15.5 mi) remaining. In total, twelve riders had to abandon the race due to injuries suffered during the crash. During the race's first rest day – held after the ninth stage individual time trial – the team hotel of the Cofidis squad, in Bourg-en-Bresse, was searched by French police and gendarmerie. One of team's riders in the Tour, Rémy Di Gregorio, was arrested in relation to an ongoing anti-doping case, and was immediately suspended by the French team; although the case had been open since 2011, when Di Gregorio was a member of the Astana team.

== Classification standings ==
Legend (Note: Jerseys appearing in the table on the left of the page indicate those worn by the cyclist during the particular stage, while those appearing in the table on the right of the page indicate those awarded to the cyclist after the stage.)
Yellow jersey	Denotes the leader of the general classification	Green jersey	Denotes the leader of the points classification
Polka dot jersey	Denotes the leader of the mountains classification	White jersey	Denotes the leader of the young rider classification
Jersey with a yellow background on the number bib.	Denotes the leader of the team classification (Note: The bibs are designated to all remaining riders within the leading team.)		

== Prologue ==
30 June 2012 — Liège (Belgium), 6.4 km (4.0 mi), (ITT)

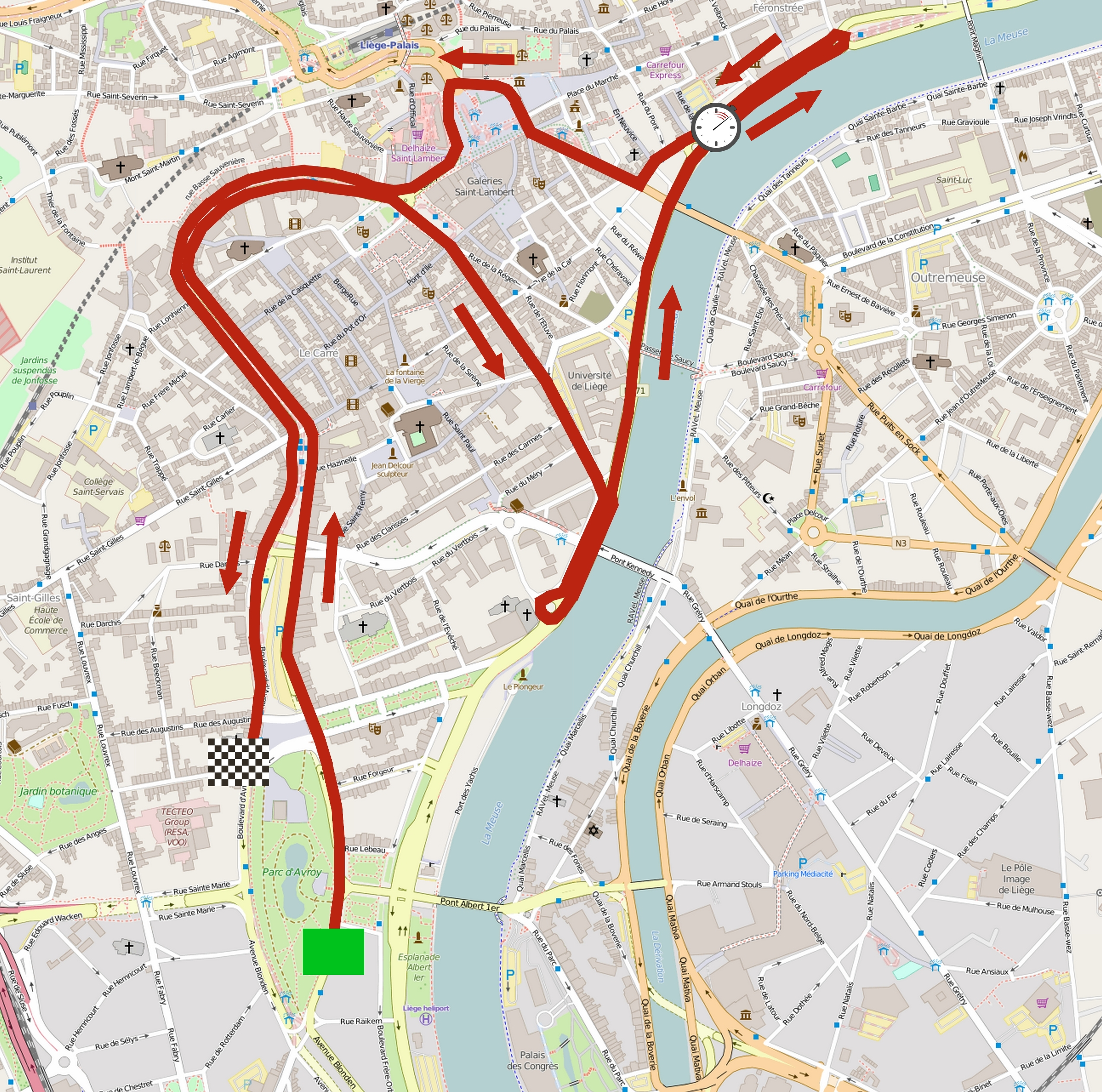
Prologue route

The prologue was a short and fairly flat circuit around Liège, with expected stage times to be about eight minutes. The start ramp was located at Avenue Rogier next to the Parc d'Avroy; the riders then headed north by the Boulevard d'Avroy and Boulevard de la Sauvenière. They then followed the Quai Roosevelt, along the Meuse, until the midway point when they returned on the opposite carriageway, before turning right towards Place Saint-Lambert, in front of the Palais des Princes-Évêques. From there, the riders rejoined the original route on the opposite carriageway of Boulevard de la Sauvenière before the finish line located on Boulevard d'Avroy on the opposite side of the Parc d'Avroy from the start.

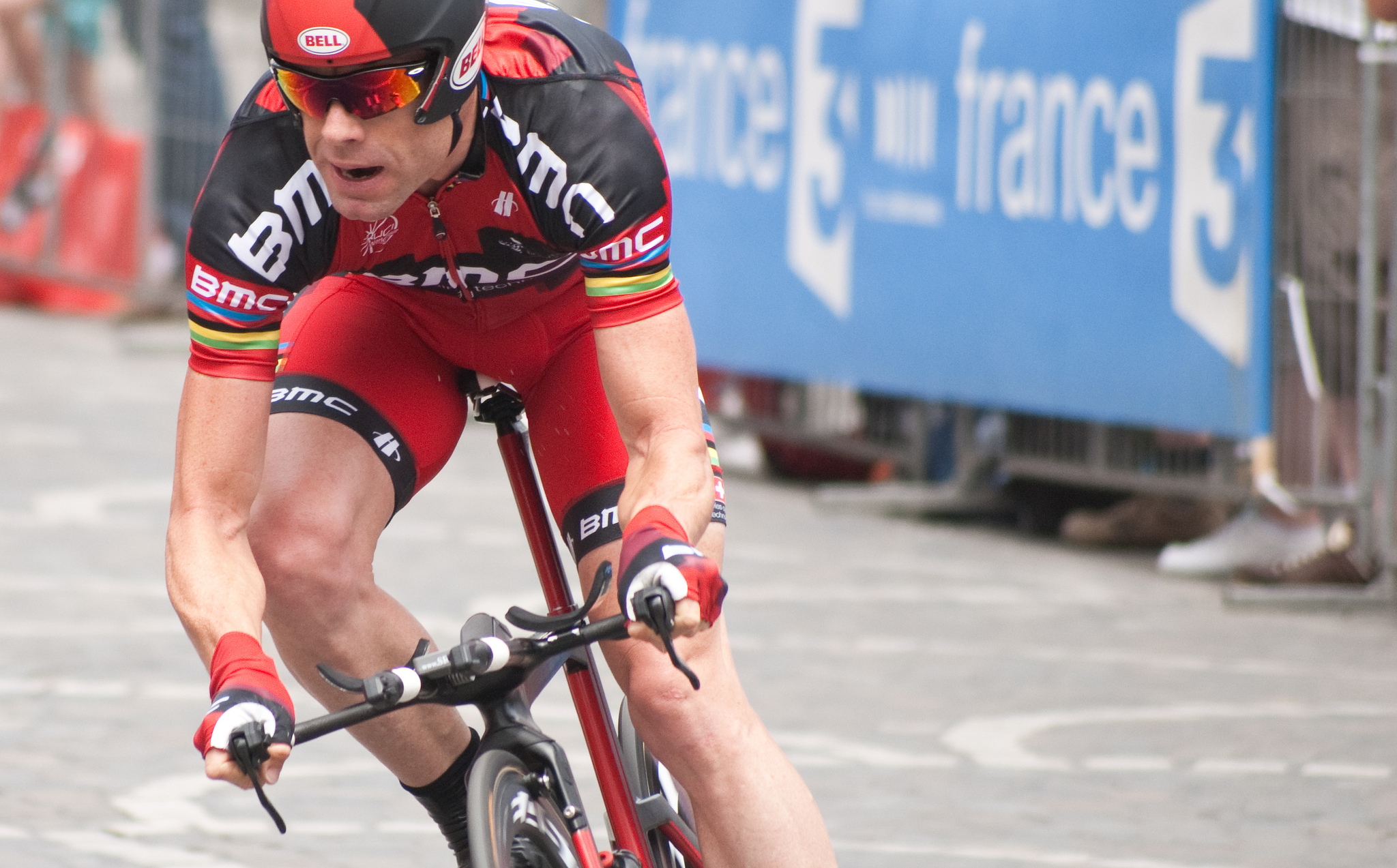
BMC Racing Team's Cadel Evans, the defending champion, warming up before the stage. He eventually finished the stage in thirteenth place, seventeen seconds down on stage winner Fabian Cancellara (RadioShack–Nissan).

With several tight corners, the prologue was expected to favour riders with good bike handling skills. The first rider to leave the start house in Liège was Argos–Shimano's Tom Veelers, with most of the general classification contenders going towards the end of the starting order, as rain was not scheduled to disrupt the race. Veelers set a time of 7' 47" for the course – which was near-identical to the 2004 prologue held in the city, won by then-Fassa Bortolo rider Fabian Cancellara, over a 6.1 km (3.8 mi) parcours – but this was immediately beaten by Orica–GreenEDGE rider Simon Gerrans, who went five seconds quicker around the course. Gerrans' lead was also not to last for long, as Ukrainian national champion Andriy Hryvko (Astana) bettered his mark by 14 seconds; the time was ultimately good enough for tenth place in the stage results. Hryvko held the lead for over an hour, as no other rider could get within three seconds of his time at that point.

It was not until Gerrans' teammate Brett Lancaster, a former prologue winner at the Giro d'Italia, that Hryvko's time was beaten; Lancaster recorded a time four seconds quicker, crossing the line at 7' 24". Team Sky rider Edvald Boasson Hagen marginally bettered Lancaster's time to assume the lead for a time, but French champion Sylvain Chavanel (Omega Pharma–Quick-Step) set a mark of 7' 20" for the course. His time held until the final ten riders to take to the course; Bradley Wiggins (Team Sky) trailed Chavanel by six seconds at the intermediate time-check – coming around halfway through the test – but paced the second half better to negate the deficit, and beat the time of Chavanel by around half a second. Cancellara, the pre-stage favourite, recorded the fastest time of 3' 35" to the intermediate point, and extended his eventual stage-winning margin to seven seconds by the finish; in the process, Cancellara won his fifth Tour prologue stage, a record.

Of other overall contenders, defending champion Cadel Evans (BMC Racing Team), Liquigas–Cannondale's Vincenzo Nibali and Garmin–Sharp rider Ryder Hesjedal, the winner of May's Giro d'Italia, all placing solidly inside the top twenty riders. Nibali's teammate Peter Sagan and world time trial champion Tony Martin (Omega Pharma–Quick-Step), who both had been tipped as favourites to win the stage, both encountered difficulties on the course during their respective runs. Sagan lost time after he overshot one of the 180-degree hairpin bends and had to clip out of the pedals, while Martin – who had set a similar time to teammate Chavanel at the intermediate time-check – suffered a puncture, and ultimately finished 23 seconds down on Cancellara's time.

Prologue result and general classification after the prologue
Rank	Rider	Team	Time
1	Fabian Cancellara (SUI)	RadioShack–Nissan	7' 13"
2	Bradley Wiggins (GBR)	Team Sky	+ 7"
3	Sylvain Chavanel (FRA)	Omega Pharma–Quick-Step	+ 7"
4	Tejay van Garderen (USA)	BMC Racing Team	+ 10"
5	Edvald Boasson Hagen (NOR)	Team Sky	+ 11"
6	Brett Lancaster (AUS)	Orica–GreenEDGE	+ 11"
7	Patrick Gretsch (GER)	Argos–Shimano	+ 12"
DSQ	~~Denis Menchov (RUS)~~ (Note: In July 2014, Denis Menchov was retroactively disqualified from the 2012 Tour de France by cycling's governing body, Union Cycliste Internationale, for "abnormalities in his biological passport". The riders positioned below Menchov were not upgraded.)	~~Team Katusha~~	~~+ 13"~~
9	Philippe Gilbert (BEL)	BMC Racing Team	+ 13"
10	Andriy Hryvko (UKR)	Astana	+ 15"

== Stage 1 ==
1 July 2012 — Liège (Belgium) to Seraing (Belgium), 198 km (123.0 mi)

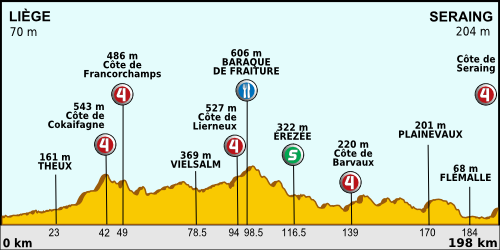
Stage one profile

The Tour remained in Belgium for the first full day's racing with a stage through the rolling countryside of the Ardennes. After four Category 4 climbs en route, the race finished at Seraing, a municipality just outside Liège. The finish was at the top of a long and fairly steep drag – the Côte de Seraing – rising for 2.4 km (1.5 mi) at an average of 4.7%, which was expected to suit the race's puncheurs such as BMC Racing Team rider Philippe Gilbert, who won a similar finish in the opening stage of the 2011 Tour at Mont des Alouettes.

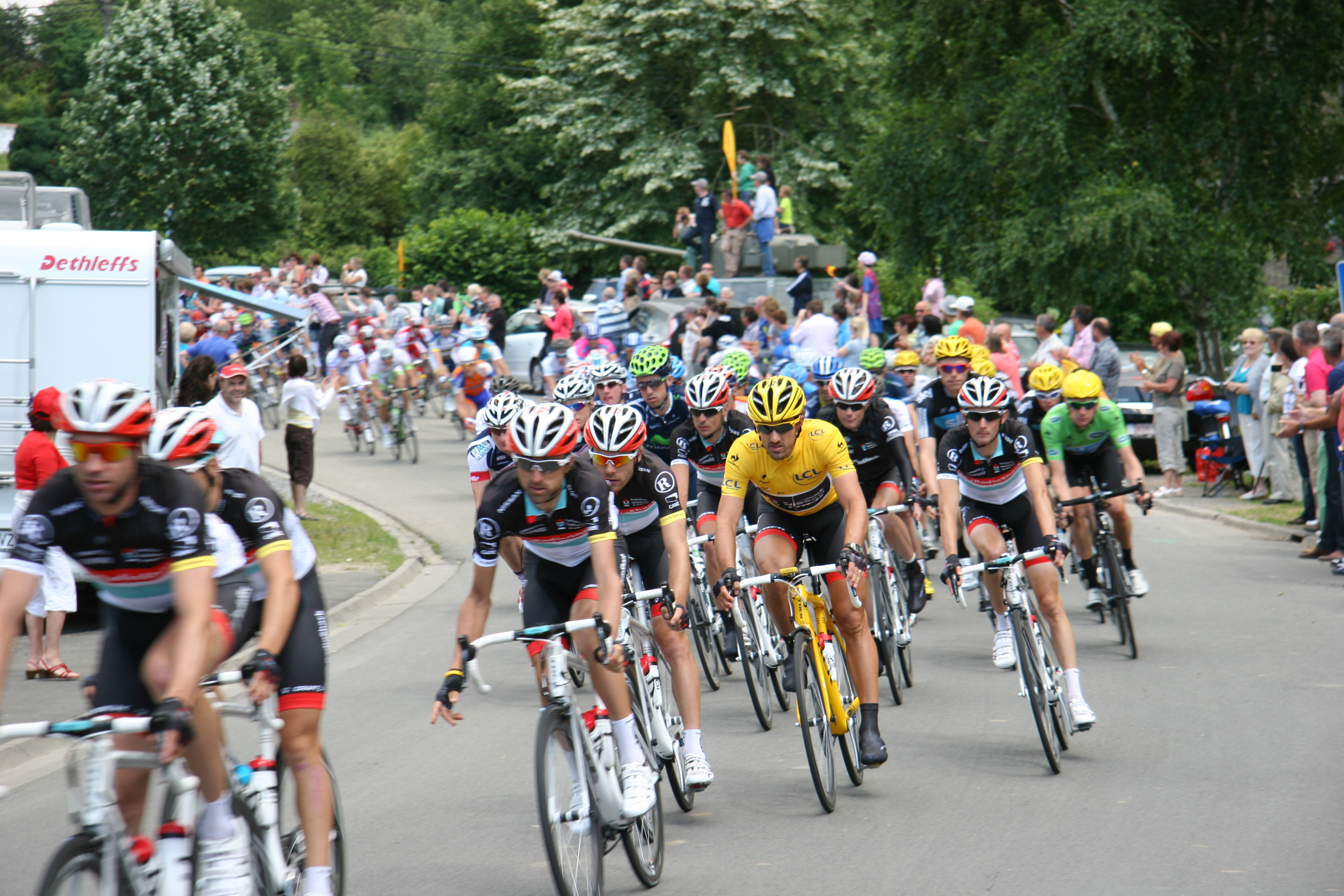
The peloton passing through Hotton, Belgium, in the first stage. Fabian Cancellara (RadioShack–Nissan) can be seen wearing the race leader's yellow jersey.

Six riders – Yohann Gène (Team Europcar), Euskaltel–Euskadi rider Pablo Urtasun, Ag2r–La Mondiale's Maxime Bouet, Nicolas Edet of Cofidis, Anthony Delaplace (Saur–Sojasun) and Saxo Bank–Tinkoff Bank rider Michael Mørkøv – advanced clear of the main field in the early running of the stage; the sextet managed to extend their advantage to a maximum of almost five minutes around a quarter of the way through the stage. By this point, Mørkøv and Urtasun had both scored a point towards the mountains classification, having led over the Côte de Cokaifagne and the Côte de Francorchamps respectively. Overall leader Fabian Cancellara was being paced by his RadioShack–Nissan teammates, and help to stabilise the gap to the leaders at around three minutes. Mørkøv then proceeded to win the two remaining climbs on the day, to take the race's first polka-dot jersey, becoming only the third Danish rider to have held the lead of that classification.

The breakaway also scored the major points at the stage's intermediate sprint point in Érezée, where Gène took the honours ahead of Urtasun and Edet, while in the main field, Orica–GreenEDGE's Matthew Goss out-sprinted his former teammates Mark Cavendish (Team Sky) and André Greipel (Lotto–Belisol) for seventh place. RadioShack–Nissan were joined by Gilbert's BMC Racing Team squad in order to reduce the lead advantage; it was cut to around a minute with 30 km (18.6 mi) to go, and the break was eventually caught inside of 10 km (6.2 mi) remaining. The field remained together onto the Côte de Seraing, but halfway up the climb, Cancellara attacked and only Peter Sagan (Liquigas–Cannondale) could hold pace with him. Team Sky's Edvald Boasson Hagen later bridged up to the duo, and it was left to the three riders to fight it out for the stage win, with the reduced peloton chasing behind. Cancellara attacked first, but Sagan came around the outside and freewheeled to his fourteenth victory of 2012, ahead of Cancellara – who maintained his overall lead – and Boasson Hagen. Gilbert led home the peloton in fourth, as 22-year-old Sagan became the youngest rider to win a Tour stage since Lance Armstrong in 1993.

Stage 1 result
Rank	Rider	Team	Time
1	Peter Sagan (SVK)	Liquigas–Cannondale	4h 58' 19"
2	Fabian Cancellara (SUI)	RadioShack–Nissan	+ 0"
3	Edvald Boasson Hagen (NOR)	Team Sky	+ 0"
4	Philippe Gilbert (BEL)	BMC Racing Team	+ 0"
5	Bauke Mollema (NED)	Rabobank	+ 0"
6	Alejandro Valverde (ESP)	Movistar Team	+ 0"
7	Robert Gesink (NED)	Rabobank	+ 0"
8	Dan Martin (IRL)	Garmin–Sharp	+ 0"
9	Ryder Hesjedal (CAN)	Garmin–Sharp	+ 0"
10	Dries Devenyns (BEL)	Omega Pharma–Quick-Step	+ 0"

General classification after stage 1
Rank	Rider	Team	Time
1	Fabian Cancellara (SUI)	RadioShack–Nissan	5h 05' 32"
2	Bradley Wiggins (GBR)	Team Sky	+ 7"
3	Sylvain Chavanel (FRA)	Omega Pharma–Quick-Step	+ 7"
4	Tejay van Garderen (USA)	BMC Racing Team	+ 10"
5	Edvald Boasson Hagen (NOR)	Team Sky	+ 11"
DSQ	~~Denis Menchov (RUS)~~	~~Team Katusha~~	~~+ 13"~~
7	Philippe Gilbert (BEL)	BMC Racing Team	+ 13"
8	Cadel Evans (AUS)	BMC Racing Team	+ 17"
9	Vincenzo Nibali (ITA)	Liquigas–Cannondale	+ 18"
10	Ryder Hesjedal (CAN)	Garmin–Sharp	+ 18"

== Stage 2 ==
2 July 2012 — Visé (Belgium) to Tournai (Belgium), 207.5 km (128.9 mi)

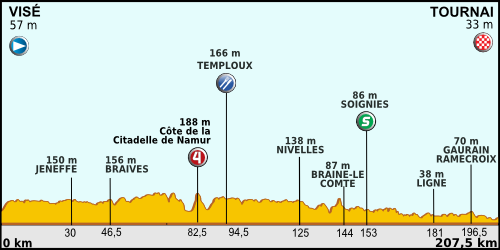
Stage two profile

The race remained in Belgium for one more day with a flat course heading almost due west from Visé. There was one fourth-category climb of the Côte de la Citadelle de Namur during the stage, but it was expected to ultimately result in a sprint finish in Tournai. Three riders – French pairing Anthony Roux of FDJ–BigMat and Team Europcar rider Christophe Kern, along with Michael Mørkøv (Saxo Bank–Tinkoff Bank), wearing the polka-dot jersey as mountains classification leader following his part in the breakaway on the first stage – went clear around 25 km (15.5 mi) after the start of the stage, making the early breakaway from the field, and the trio managed to extend their advantage over the main field to around eight minutes, around 20 km (12.4 mi) later.

RadioShack–Nissan took up duties at the front of the peloton in order to reduce the gap that the leaders had held; although by the time that Mørkøv scored the point for crossing the summit of the Côte de la Citadelle de Namur first, around 40 km (24.9 mi) later, the lead had only been reduced to around six-and-a-half minutes. Again, the breakaway took top points on offer at the intermediate sprint point in Soignies, with Kern taking maximum points for Team Europcar for the second successive day. None of the trio elected to contest the sprint, while back in the main field, Matthew Goss (Orica–GreenEDGE) again won the sprint contest for fourth place ahead of Rabobank rider Mark Renshaw, Mark Cavendish of Team Sky and the previous day's stage winner, Liquigas–Cannondale's Peter Sagan. With around 30 km (18.6 mi) remaining of the stage, Roux attacked his two fellow breakaway companions, going off on his own as Mørkøv and Kern allowed themselves to fall back into the confines of the main field.

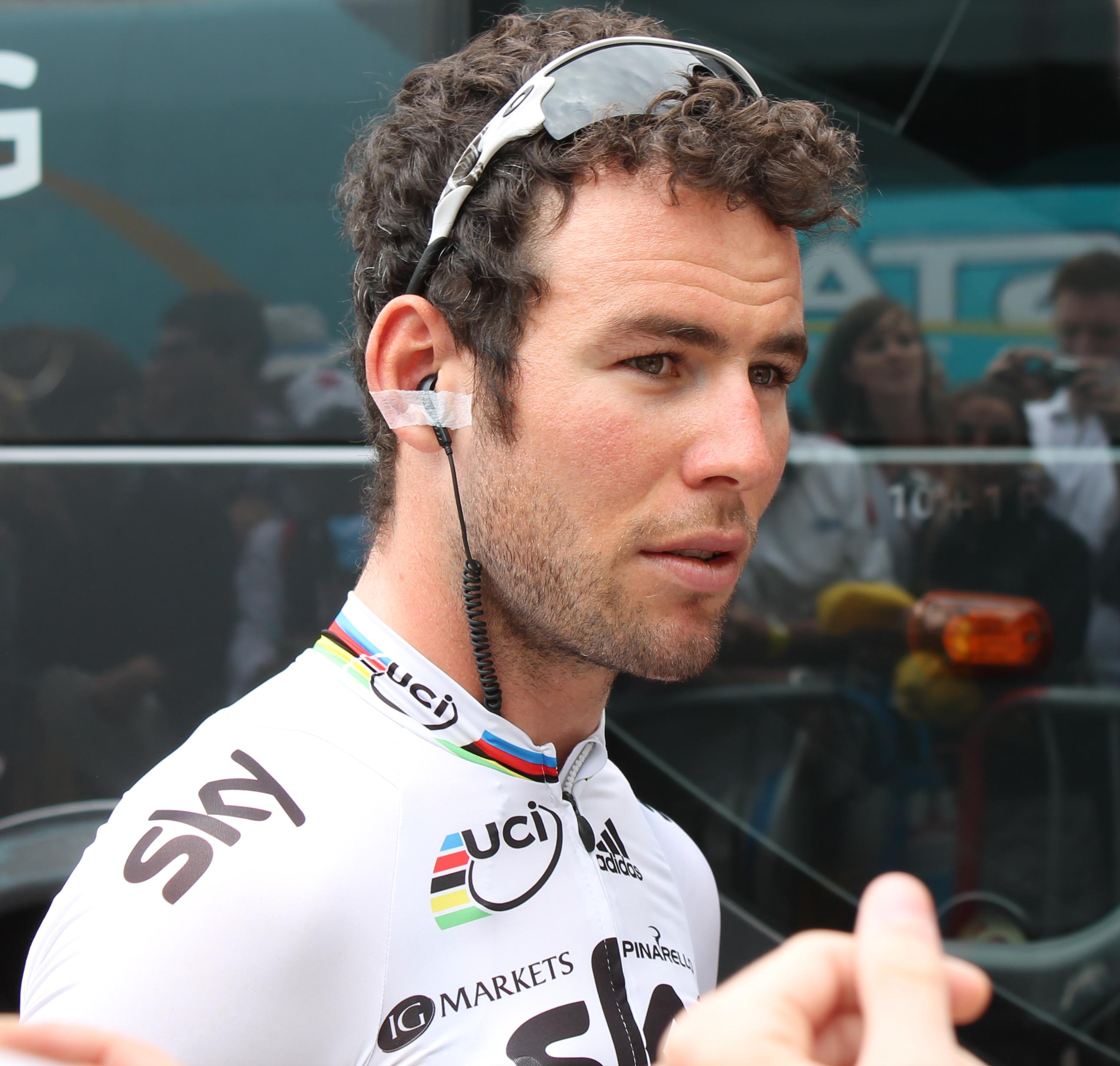
Team Sky's Mark Cavendish (pictured in stage eighteen) won the second stage from a bunch sprint.

Roux managed to gain an advantage of almost a minute, but he too was brought back by the main field inside the final 15 km (9.3 mi) of the stage. Orica–GreenEDGE, Omega Pharma–Quick-Step and Lotto–Belisol held the front with Argos–Shimano sprinter Marcel Kittel falling off the back of the field, as he was suffering from stomach problems; instead their focus would be left with his lead-out man Tom Veelers. The field remained together for the sprint finish in Tournai; Lotto–Belisol led it out for Greipel, with Sagan just behind. Cavendish moved up the order, behind two other riders – Orica–GreenEDGE's Daryl Impey and Team Katusha rider Óscar Freire – and slid in behind Greipel with around 300 m (980 ft) to go. Cavendish launched his sprint off Greipel's wheel with 200 m (660 ft) left, and got the better of him by half a wheel to take his 21st Tour stage victory, moving out of a tie with Luxembourg's Nicolas Frantz for sixth place on the all-time Tour stage wins list. Greipel, Goss, Veelers and Lampre–ISD's Alessandro Petacchi completed the top five on the stage, with Sagan taking the points classification lead, and the green jersey, from RadioShack–Nissan's Fabian Cancellara with sixth place. Cancellara maintained his seven-second overall lead over Cavendish's teammate Bradley Wiggins.

Stage 2 result
Rank	Rider	Team	Time
1	Mark Cavendish (GBR)	Team Sky	4h 56' 59"
2	André Greipel (GER)	Lotto–Belisol	+ 0"
3	Matthew Goss (AUS)	Orica–GreenEDGE	+ 0"
4	Tom Veelers (NED)	Argos–Shimano	+ 0"
5	Alessandro Petacchi (ITA)	Lampre–ISD	+ 0"
6	Peter Sagan (SVK)	Liquigas–Cannondale	+ 0"
7	Yauheni Hutarovich (BLR)	FDJ–BigMat	+ 0"
8	Juan José Haedo (ARG)	Saxo Bank–Tinkoff Bank	+ 0"
9	Mark Renshaw (AUS)	Rabobank	+ 0"
10	Tyler Farrar (USA)	Garmin–Sharp	+ 0"

General classification after stage 2
Rank	Rider	Team	Time
1	Fabian Cancellara (SUI)	RadioShack–Nissan	10h 02' 31"
2	Bradley Wiggins (GBR)	Team Sky	+ 7"
3	Sylvain Chavanel (FRA)	Omega Pharma–Quick-Step	+ 7"
4	Tejay van Garderen (USA)	BMC Racing Team	+ 10"
5	Edvald Boasson Hagen (NOR)	Team Sky	+ 11"
DSQ	~~Denis Menchov (RUS)~~	~~Team Katusha~~	~~+ 13"~~
7	Philippe Gilbert (BEL)	BMC Racing Team	+ 13"
8	Cadel Evans (AUS)	BMC Racing Team	+ 17"
9	Vincenzo Nibali (ITA)	Liquigas–Cannondale	+ 18"
10	Ryder Hesjedal (CAN)	Garmin–Sharp	+ 18"

== Stage 3 ==
3 July 2012 — Orchies to Boulogne-sur-Mer, 197 km (122.4 mi)

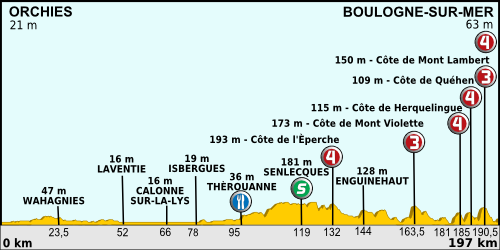
Stage three profile

Following its three-day opening salvo in Belgium, the Tour moved back to France, starting in Orchies – where the fifth stage team time trial of the 1982 race was abandoned in progress due to industrial action – before heading west towards Boulogne-sur-Mer. There were six climbs within the closing 65 km (40.4 mi) of the parcours – all 1.7 km (1.1 mi) long or shorter – including the final 700 m (2,300 ft) long climb up to the finish, with an average gradient of 7.4%. Like the first stage, the course was ideally favoured towards the puncheurs.

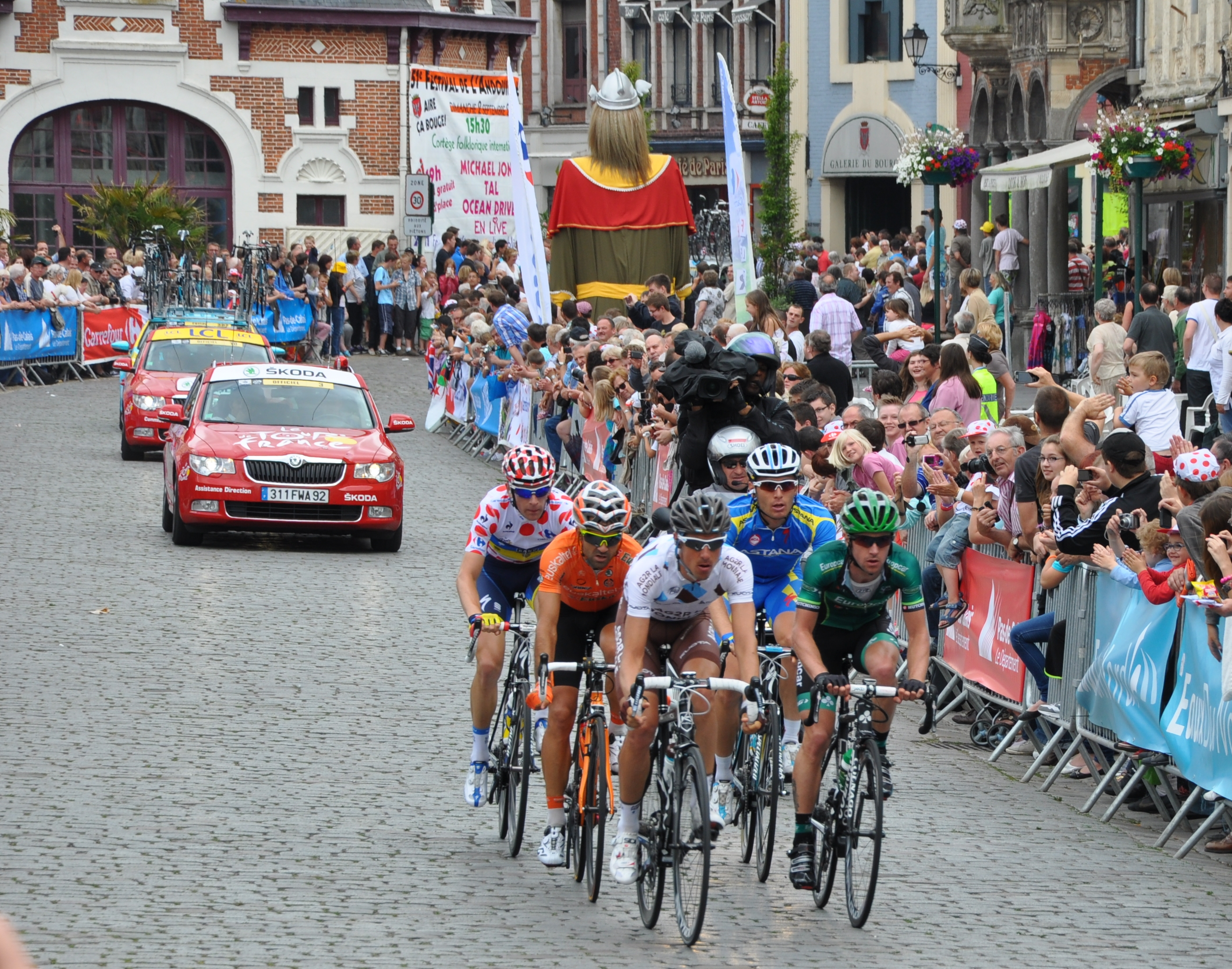
The breakaway in the commune of Aire-sur-la-Lys, around a third into the stage. Sébastien Minard leads Giovanni Bernaudeau, Rubén Pérez, Andriy Hryvko and Michael Mørkøv.

There was a fast-paced start to the stage with several short and punchy attacks, but were closed down immediately. However, a five-rider move was allowed to be initiated after 8 km (5.0 mi), with Ag2r–La Mondiale's Sébastien Minard, Rubén Pérez of Euskaltel–Euskadi, Andriy Hryvko representing the Astana team, Saxo Bank–Tinkoff Bank rider Michael Mørkøv – continuing his run of being in the breakaway in each of the road stages so far – and Giovanni Bernaudeau of Team Europcar all breaking free, quickly gaining a lead of around two minutes. Their lead eventually reached a maximum of over five-and-a-half minutes before RadioShack–Nissan and Liquigas–Cannondale made their presence at the front of the peloton, for their respective classification leaders Fabian Cancellara (overall) and Peter Sagan (points). The breakaway again scored the major points at the intermediate sprint point in Senlecques; Team Sky rider Mark Cavendish won the bunch sprint for sixth place, despite being boxed in by Vacansoleil–DCM's Kenny van Hummel, with the two riders later exchanging words.

Mørkøv extended his mountains lead by crossing each of the first two climbs ahead of his rivals, while behind, several large crashes in the peloton took down a number of riders. Two riders suffered fractures and had to abandon on the route: Team Sky's Kanstantsin Sivtsov (tibia) and Movistar Team's José Joaquín Rojas (collarbone). Mørkøv and Hryvko dropped their breakaway companions, and managed to hold off until 10 km (6.2 mi) to go when Mørkøv cracked on the Côte du Mont Lambert. Hryvko held off until the top of the climb, where he was then caught himself. Omega Pharma–Quick-Step's Sylvain Chavanel attacked with 5.5 km (3.4 mi) to go, and at one point, put fifteen seconds between himself and the field, but he was caught 450 m (1,480 ft) before the finish by the BMC Racing Team-led field. Sagan comfortably took the sprint for the line, holding enough of a lead to free-wheel the closing metres and performing a "running man" salute akin to Tom Hanks's character in 1994 film Forrest Gump. A one-second time difference between Sagan and the field – led home by Team Sky's Edvald Boasson Hagen, Peter Velits (Omega Pharma–Quick-Step) and Cancellara – was announced by the organisers, with all riders that were delayed in a crash in the closing metres, given the same time as Boasson Hagen et al.

Stage 3 result
Rank	Rider	Team	Time
1	Peter Sagan (SVK)	Liquigas–Cannondale	4h 42' 58"
2	Edvald Boasson Hagen (NOR)	Team Sky	+ 1"
3	Peter Velits (SVK)	Omega Pharma–Quick-Step	+ 1"
4	Fabian Cancellara (SUI)	RadioShack–Nissan	+ 1"
5	Michael Albasini (SUI)	Orica–GreenEDGE	+ 1"
6	Cadel Evans (AUS)	BMC Racing Team	+ 1"
7	Nicolas Roche (IRL)	Ag2r–La Mondiale	+ 1"
8	Samuel Sánchez (ESP)	Euskaltel–Euskadi	+ 1"
9	Bauke Mollema (NED)	Rabobank	+ 1"
10	Vincenzo Nibali (ITA)	Liquigas–Cannondale	+ 1"

General classification after stage 3
Rank	Rider	Team	Time
1	Fabian Cancellara (SUI)	RadioShack–Nissan	14h 45' 30"
2	Bradley Wiggins (GBR)	Team Sky	+ 7"
3	Sylvain Chavanel (FRA)	Omega Pharma–Quick-Step	+ 7"
4	Tejay van Garderen (USA)	BMC Racing Team	+ 10"
5	Edvald Boasson Hagen (NOR)	Team Sky	+ 11"
DSQ	~~Denis Menchov (RUS)~~	~~Team Katusha~~	~~+ 13"~~
7	Cadel Evans (AUS)	BMC Racing Team	+ 17"
8	Vincenzo Nibali (ITA)	Liquigas–Cannondale	+ 18"
9	Ryder Hesjedal (CAN)	Garmin–Sharp	+ 18"
10	Andreas Klöden (GER)	RadioShack–Nissan	+ 19"

== Stage 4 ==
4 July 2012 — Abbeville to Rouen, 214.5 km (133.3 mi)

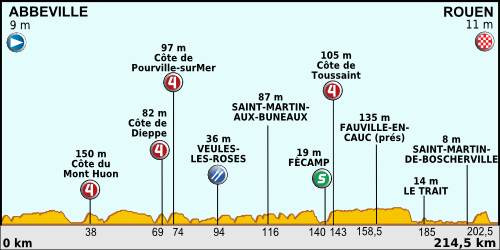
Stage four profile

The first half of the stage followed the coast of Picardy and Normandy along the English Channel through Dieppe to the intermediate sprint point of Fécamp, before turning inland towards the finish at Rouen, with four fourth-category climbs during the 214.5 km (133.3 mi) parcours. The wind on the coast was expected to have an influence on the race, while the two tight turns to get over the Guillaume le Conquérant Bridge with 1 km (0.6 mi) to go, were potentially disruptive for the lead-outs ahead of an expected sprint finish along the quayside in Rouen.

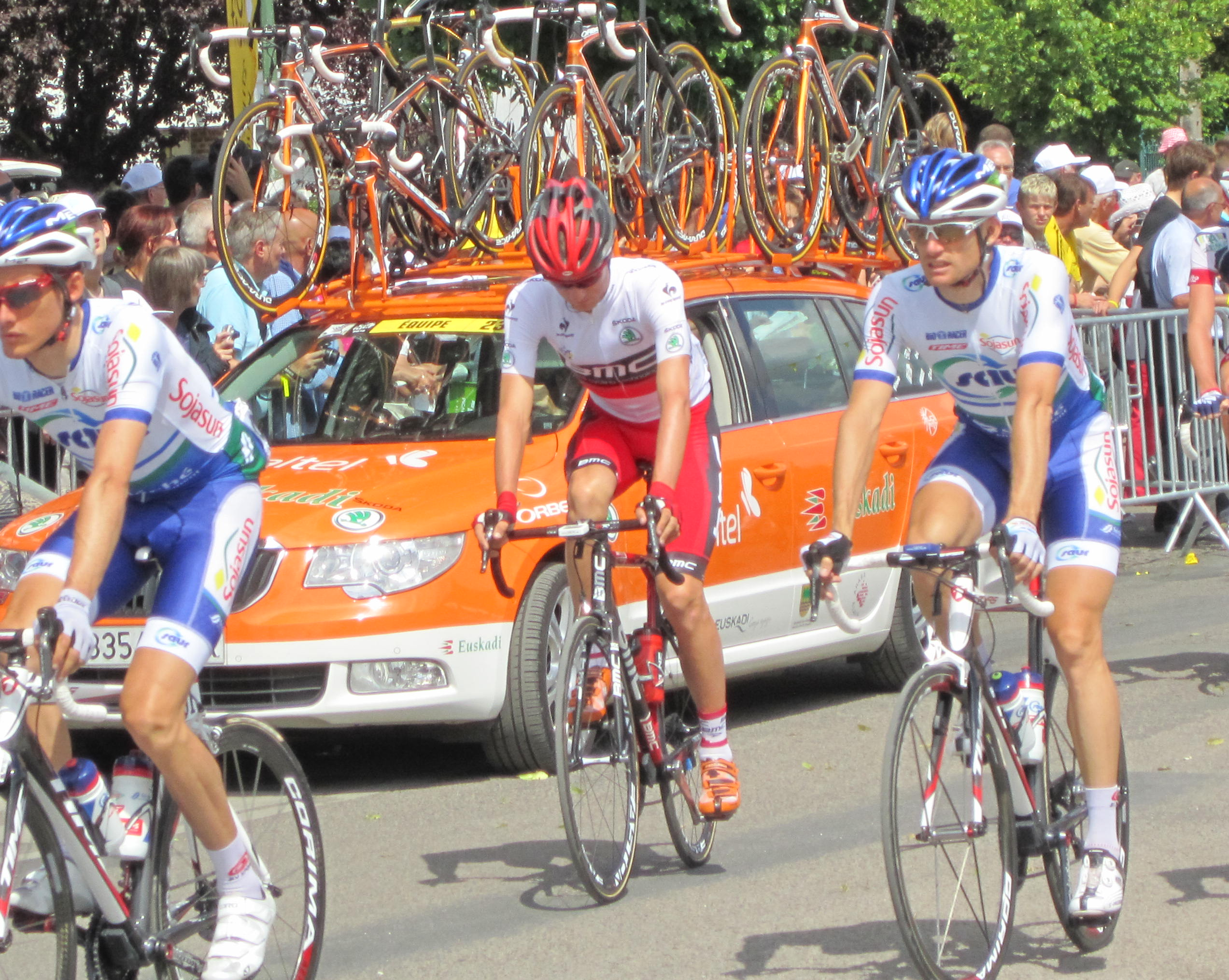
Fourth placed overall and young rider classification leader Tejay van Garderen (center) of BMC Racing Team before the start of the stage

A three-rider breakaway was formed in the early kilometres of the stage, with the riders all representing French-licensed Professional Continental teams. Home riders David Moncoutié (Cofidis) and Anthony Delaplace (Saur–Sojasun) were joined by Japan's Yukiya Arashiro representing Team Europcar, as they set about gaining an advantage of over eight-and-a-half minutes from the main field. On the day, Moncoutié and Delaplace would ultimately share the four categorised climbs between them, each scoring two points towards the mountains classification; while Arashiro, the best sprinter among the trio, took maximum points at Fécamp. The now-customary bunch sprint for the minor points was again taken by Team Sky's Mark Cavendish, after launching his sprint off the rear wheel of Orica–GreenEDGE's Matthew Goss. Rabobank's Mark Renshaw just edged out points leader Peter Sagan of Liquigas–Cannondale for sixth place points. A light rain shower hit the race with around 50 km (31.1 mi) remaining, before the first crash of the day with Saxo Bank–Tinkoff Bank's Jonathan Cantwell and Sagan's teammate Vincenzo Nibali among those delayed, but both would later rejoin the main field.

The lead gap continued to dwindle as the race wore on, with Delaplace eventually leaving his breakaway companions behind with 10 km (6.2 mi) to go. Six more riders looked to join the leading trio but all riders were eventually brought back 3.5 km (2.2 mi) ahead of the finish. Inside the final 3 km (1.9 mi), another crash took down a number of riders including Cavendish and lead-out man Bernhard Eisel, as well as the Garmin–Sharp duo Robert Hunter and Tyler Farrar. The final sprint was between the sprint trains of Lotto–Belisol, Argos–Shimano and Orica–GreenEDGE; Jürgen Roelandts, Marcel Sieberg and Greg Henderson set the tempo for André Greipel to lead it out from the front, and Greipel achieved a stage victory at the Tour for the second consecutive year, the first such occurrence for a German rider since Erik Zabel. Alessandro Petacchi (Lampre–ISD) beat Argos–Shimano's Tom Veelers to the line for second, with Goss and Sagan – the latter despite being delayed by the late-stage crash – rounding out the top five.

Stage 4 result
Rank	Rider	Team	Time
1	André Greipel (GER)	Lotto–Belisol	5h 18' 32"
2	Alessandro Petacchi (ITA)	Lampre–ISD	+ 0"
3	Tom Veelers (NED)	Argos–Shimano	+ 0"
4	Matthew Goss (AUS)	Orica–GreenEDGE	+ 0"
5	Peter Sagan (SVK)	Liquigas–Cannondale	+ 0"
6	Jonathan Cantwell (AUS)	Saxo Bank–Tinkoff Bank	+ 0"
7	Daryl Impey (RSA)	Orica–GreenEDGE	+ 0"
8	Kris Boeckmans (BEL)	Vacansoleil–DCM	+ 0"
9	Edvald Boasson Hagen (NOR)	Team Sky	+ 0"
10	Rubén Pérez (ESP)	Euskaltel–Euskadi	+ 0"

General classification after stage 4
Rank	Rider	Team	Time
1	Fabian Cancellara (SUI)	RadioShack–Nissan	20h 04' 02"
2	Bradley Wiggins (GBR)	Team Sky	+ 7"
3	Sylvain Chavanel (FRA)	Omega Pharma–Quick-Step	+ 7"
4	Tejay van Garderen (USA)	BMC Racing Team	+ 10"
5	Edvald Boasson Hagen (NOR)	Team Sky	+ 11"
DSQ	~~Denis Menchov (RUS)~~	~~Team Katusha~~	~~+ 13"~~
7	Cadel Evans (AUS)	BMC Racing Team	+ 17"
8	Vincenzo Nibali (ITA)	Liquigas–Cannondale	+ 18"
9	Ryder Hesjedal (CAN)	Garmin–Sharp	+ 18"
10	Andreas Klöden (GER)	RadioShack–Nissan	+ 19"

== Stage 5 ==
5 July 2012 — Rouen to Saint-Quentin, 196.5 km (122.1 mi)

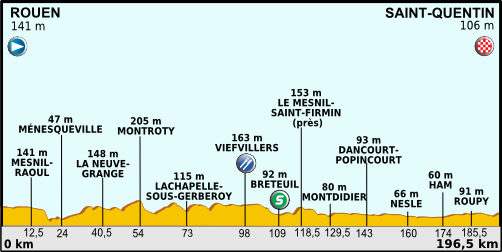
Stage five profile

This was a very flat day's racing heading in a north-easterly direction with no rated climbs, with a wide straight finish in the Champs-Élysées Park. As a result, the stage was expected to favour the sprinters. Almost immediately after the peloton rolled out of the start in Rouen, FDJ–BigMat's Mathieu Ladagnous, was the first rider to break the confines of the main field and was allowed to go clear without resistance. He was joined by three more riders over the next few kilometres, as Pablo Urtasun of Euskaltel–Euskadi, Saur–Sojasun's Julien Simon and Cofidis rider Jan Ghyselinck provided assistance, and soon the quartet held an advantage of 5' 30" after 40 km (24.9 mi) of the stage.

It was at that point that Marcel Kittel, Argos–Shimano's main sprinter, abandoned the race due to his ongoing gastroenteritis. The leaders held an advantage of around three minutes as they approached the intermediate sprint point in Breteuil, coming after 107.5 km (66.8 mi) of the parcours. Ladagnous took the maximum points on offer, as the four leaders rolled through the line without competition. As it was the previous day, Mark Cavendish (Team Sky) led the main field across the line, ahead of Orica–GreenEDGE's Matthew Goss and Rabobank rider Mark Renshaw. The gap remained around the three-minute mark until 40 km (24.9 mi) to go, when it was gradually brought back by the peloton. At 3 km (1.9 mi), the lead quartet held a lead of 20 seconds, while in the peloton, another big crash occurred; among those hitting the tarmac were points leader Peter Sagan (Liquigas–Cannondale) and Garmin–Sharp's Tyler Farrar.

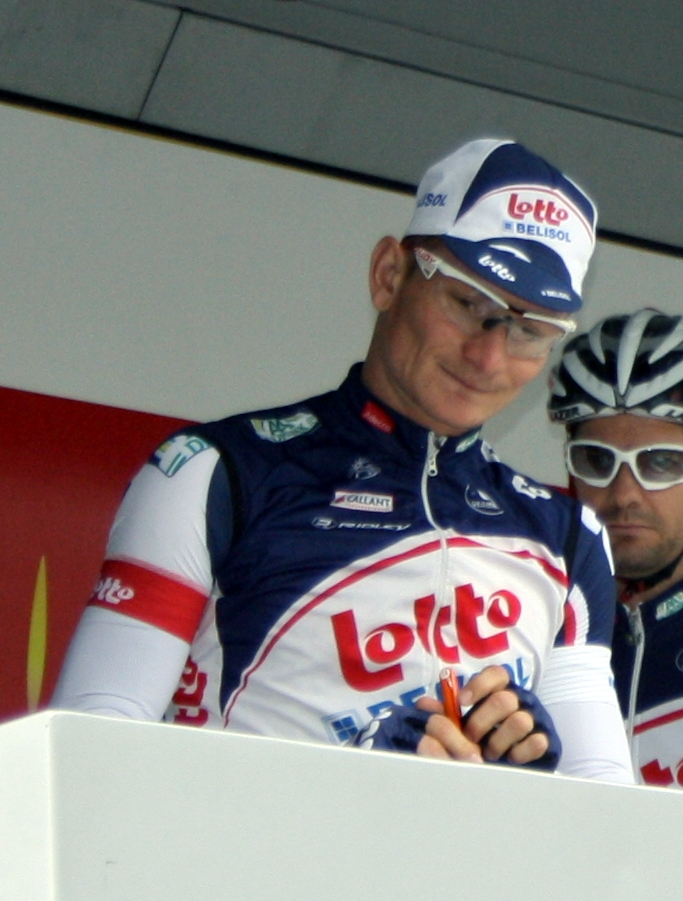
Lotto–Belisol rider André Greipel (pictured in 2012) gained a second successive win in the fifth stage.

Farrar, suffering his fourth crash of the race, fell after a clash of elbows with Argos–Shimano rider Tom Veelers; after the stage, an angered Farrar tried to board the Argos–Shimano team bus to voice his feelings towards Veelers, but was escorted away by Garmin–Sharp staff, including general manager Jonathan Vaughters. Ghyselinck attacked with just 1.1 km (0.7 mi) remaining, gaining some space from his three breakaway companions. He faded on the finishing incline, as Urtasun and Ladagnous both passed him; Urtasun was ultimately passed by the sprinters with 200 m (660 ft) to go. Goss launched his sprint first, with Ghyselinck's teammate Samuel Dumoulin on his wheel; but for the second stage running, it was André Greipel (Lotto–Belisol) who took victory ahead of Goss, Saxo Bank–Tinkoff Bank's Juan José Haedo, Dumoulin and Cavendish. RadioShack–Nissan's Fabian Cancellara maintained the yellow jersey – earning the 27th of his career – which set a record for a rider not to have won the Tour, surpassing France's René Vietto.

Stage 5 result
Rank	Rider	Team	Time
1	André Greipel (GER)	Lotto–Belisol	4h 41' 30"
2	Matthew Goss (AUS)	Orica–GreenEDGE	+ 0"
3	Juan José Haedo (ARG)	Saxo Bank–Tinkoff Bank	+ 0"
4	Samuel Dumoulin (FRA)	Cofidis	+ 0"
5	Mark Cavendish (GBR)	Team Sky	+ 0"
6	Tom Veelers (NED)	Argos–Shimano	+ 0"
7	Óscar Freire (ESP)	Team Katusha	+ 0"
8	Alessandro Petacchi (ITA)	Lampre–ISD	+ 0"
9	Sébastien Hinault (FRA)	Ag2r–La Mondiale	+ 0"
10	Yohann Gène (FRA)	Team Europcar	+ 0"

General classification after stage 5
Rank	Rider	Team	Time
1	Fabian Cancellara (SUI)	RadioShack–Nissan	24h 45' 32"
2	Bradley Wiggins (GBR)	Team Sky	+ 7"
3	Sylvain Chavanel (FRA)	Omega Pharma–Quick-Step	+ 7"
4	Tejay van Garderen (USA)	BMC Racing Team	+ 10"
5	Edvald Boasson Hagen (NOR)	Team Sky	+ 11"
DSQ	~~Denis Menchov (RUS)~~	~~Team Katusha~~	~~+ 13"~~
7	Cadel Evans (AUS)	BMC Racing Team	+ 17"
8	Vincenzo Nibali (ITA)	Liquigas–Cannondale	+ 18"
9	Ryder Hesjedal (CAN)	Garmin–Sharp	+ 18"
10	Andreas Klöden (GER)	RadioShack–Nissan	+ 19"

== Stage 6 ==
6 July 2012 — Épernay to Metz, 205 km (127.4 mi)

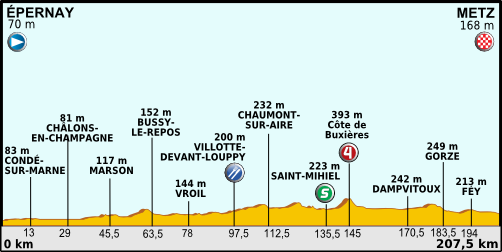
Stage six profile

This was the last flat stage before the race entered the mountains; during the 205 km (127.4 mi) parcours, there was one fourth-category climb of the Côte de Buxières, around 10 km (6.2 mi) after the intermediate sprint point, coming at 135.5 km (84.2 mi) in the commune of Saint-Mihiel. The race finished near the Centre Pompidou where another bunch sprint was expected. Once again, it was a four-rider breakaway that was allowed to be instigated in the early kilometres. David Zabriskie (Garmin–Sharp) was the first rider to go off the front, and he was later bolstered by Team Europcar's Davide Malacarne, Cofidis rider Romain Zingle and Saxo Bank–Tinkoff Bank's Karsten Kroon, who joined him after around 10 km (6.2 mi) of racing. They later established a maximum lead of around six-and-a-half minutes early in the stage.

Around 35 km (21.7 mi) into the stage, there was a minor crash involving the winner of the previous two stages, André Greipel (Lotto–Belisol), and overall contenders Robert Gesink (Rabobank) and Alejandro Valverde (Movistar Team) amongst others. Greipel suffered a dislocated shoulder in the crash, although all riders would later rejoin the main field; Greipel did not contest the intermediate sprint for points, where Kroon led over the line in the breakaway, while behind, it was Orica–GreenEDGE's Matthew Goss that took the most available points from the main field – eleven for fifth – ahead of Team Sky's Mark Cavendish and points leader Peter Sagan of Liquigas–Cannondale. Zabriskie crossed the summit of the Côte de Buxières first to claim the point on offer for the mountains classification, while in the peloton, there was another minor crash; Greipel was involved again, as were his teammate Jelle Vanendert and Rabobank's Bauke Mollema. Again, the peloton splintered due to the crashes, but due to a reduction in pace, those delayed were able to rejoin the main field.

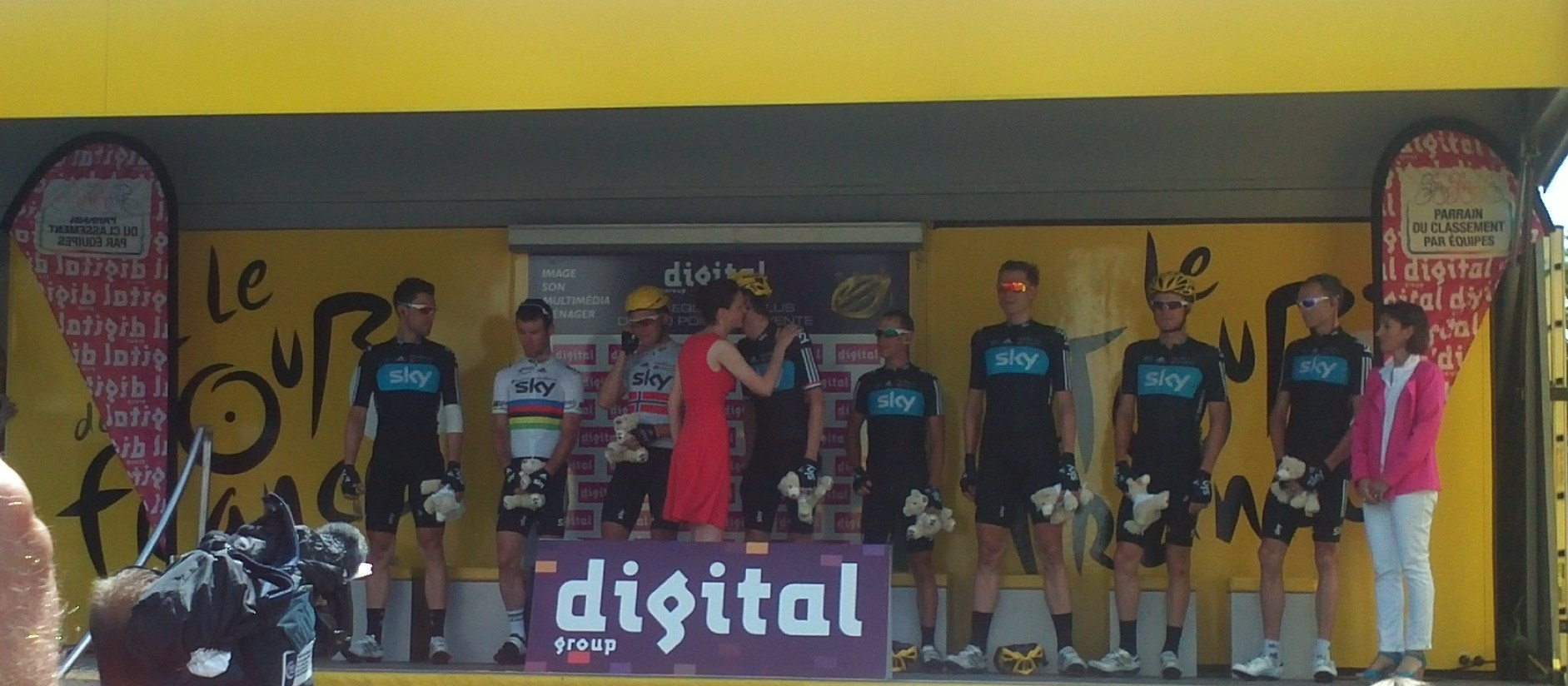
The leaders of the team classification Team Sky being awarded after the stage

With 25 km (15.5 mi) of the day's stage remaining, a much larger crash delayed the majority of the field. According to Lampre–ISD's Danilo Hondo, the crash was caused by his teammate Davide Viganò while adjusting his jersey and fell into a ditch, causing other riders to stack up behind. Amongst the riders that were delayed by the crash were Fränk Schleck (RadioShack–Nissan), Steven Kruijswijk (Rabobank), Gesink, Mollema, Valverde, Vanendert, Lampre–ISD's Michele Scarponi, Team Europcar's Pierre Rolland and the entire Garmin–Sharp team with the exception of Zabriskie. Cavendish was also delayed, but although he was able to avoid the crash, he picked up a puncture in the process. Four riders abandoned the race on the route due to injuries suffered; Garmin–Sharp's Tom Danielson – who had already been racing with a separated shoulder – suffered trauma to his other shoulder, hip and arm, and was sent to hospital; he was joined there by Viganò (damaged shoulder), Euskaltel–Euskadi's Mikel Astarloza (dislocated elbow), and Vacansoleil–DCM's Wout Poels, who tried to ride on for 10 km (6.2 mi) but eventually had to abandon; he was later diagnosed with a ruptured spleen and kidney, as well as three broken ribs and bruised lungs. After completing the stage, Team Katusha's Óscar Freire (broken rib and punctured lung), Imanol Erviti of the Movistar Team ("loss of muscle mass"), and Maarten Wynants of Rabobank (broken ribs and punctured lung) had to withdraw as well.

After the crash, the race had split into many distinct groups; the breakaway still held a minute's lead over a reduced peloton of around sixty riders, with those delayed in several more groups a few minutes and more behind. With nearly all of their riders able to get through the chaos, Orica–GreenEDGE took up pace-making on the front of the peloton, in the hopes of getting Goss the stage victory. The breakaway held a 15-second lead with 10 km (6.2 mi) to go, but it took until the final 2.5 km (1.6 mi) to catch them, with Zabriskie holding off to 1.3 km (0.8 mi) remaining. This set up the sprint, with Goss going first, while Sagan was nearly boxed in by Vacansoleil–DCM's Kris Boeckmans as he suffered a snapped chain with 400 m (1,300 ft) to go; he made it round him and soon passed Greipel, who faded in the closing stages, and he picked up his third stage victory of his début Tour, becoming the fifteenth rider to do so. With Edvald Boasson Hagen (Team Sky) and Ryder Hesjedal (Garmin–Sharp) among those delayed, Sagan moved into the top ten overall along with Maxime Monfort (RadioShack–Nissan), as Monfort's teammate Fabian Cancellara maintained the overall lead once again.

Stage 6 result
Rank	Rider	Team	Time
1	Peter Sagan (SVK)	Liquigas–Cannondale	4h 37' 00"
2	André Greipel (GER)	Lotto–Belisol	+ 0"
3	Matthew Goss (AUS)	Orica–GreenEDGE	+ 0"
4	Kenny van Hummel (NED)	Vacansoleil–DCM	+ 0"
5	Juan José Haedo (ARG)	Saxo Bank–Tinkoff Bank	+ 0"
6	Greg Henderson (NZL)	Lotto–Belisol	+ 0"
7	Alessandro Petacchi (ITA)	Lampre–ISD	+ 0"
8	Luca Paolini (ITA)	Team Katusha	+ 0"
9	Daryl Impey (RSA)	Orica–GreenEDGE	+ 0"
10	Brett Lancaster (AUS)	Orica–GreenEDGE	+ 4"

General classification after stage 6
Rank	Rider	Team	Time
1	Fabian Cancellara (SUI)	RadioShack–Nissan	29h 22' 36"
2	Bradley Wiggins (GBR)	Team Sky	+ 7"
3	Sylvain Chavanel (FRA)	Omega Pharma–Quick-Step	+ 7"
4	Tejay van Garderen (USA)	BMC Racing Team	+ 10"
DSQ	~~Denis Menchov (RUS)~~	~~Team Katusha~~	~~+ 13"~~
6	Cadel Evans (AUS)	BMC Racing Team	+ 17"
7	Vincenzo Nibali (ITA)	Liquigas–Cannondale	+ 18"
8	Peter Sagan (SVK)	Liquigas–Cannondale	+ 19"
9	Andreas Klöden (GER)	RadioShack–Nissan	+ 19"
10	Maxime Monfort (BEL)	RadioShack–Nissan	+ 22"

== Stage 7 ==
7 July 2012 — Tomblaine to La Planche des Belles Filles, 199 km (123.7 mi)

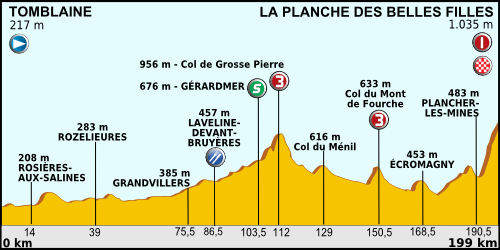
Stage seven profile

The race entered the high mountains with a first-time finish at 1,035 m (3,396 ft) at the ski resort of La Planche des Belles Filles in the Vosges. After two third-category climbs, the final climb was 5.9 km (3.7 mi) long and averaged 8.5% with places of the climbs reaching 14–20% in the closing stages. Following on from the crash the previous day, five more riders abandoned the race prior to the stage; Giro d'Italia winner Ryder Hesjedal of Garmin–Sharp (hip and leg), was joined on the sidelines by teammate Robert Hunter (vertebrae), Ag2r–La Mondiale's Hubert Dupont (sprained ankle, fractures to vertebrae and radius), Movistar Team's Iván Gutiérrez (knee), and Euskaltel–Euskadi's Amets Txurruka, who fractured his collarbone.

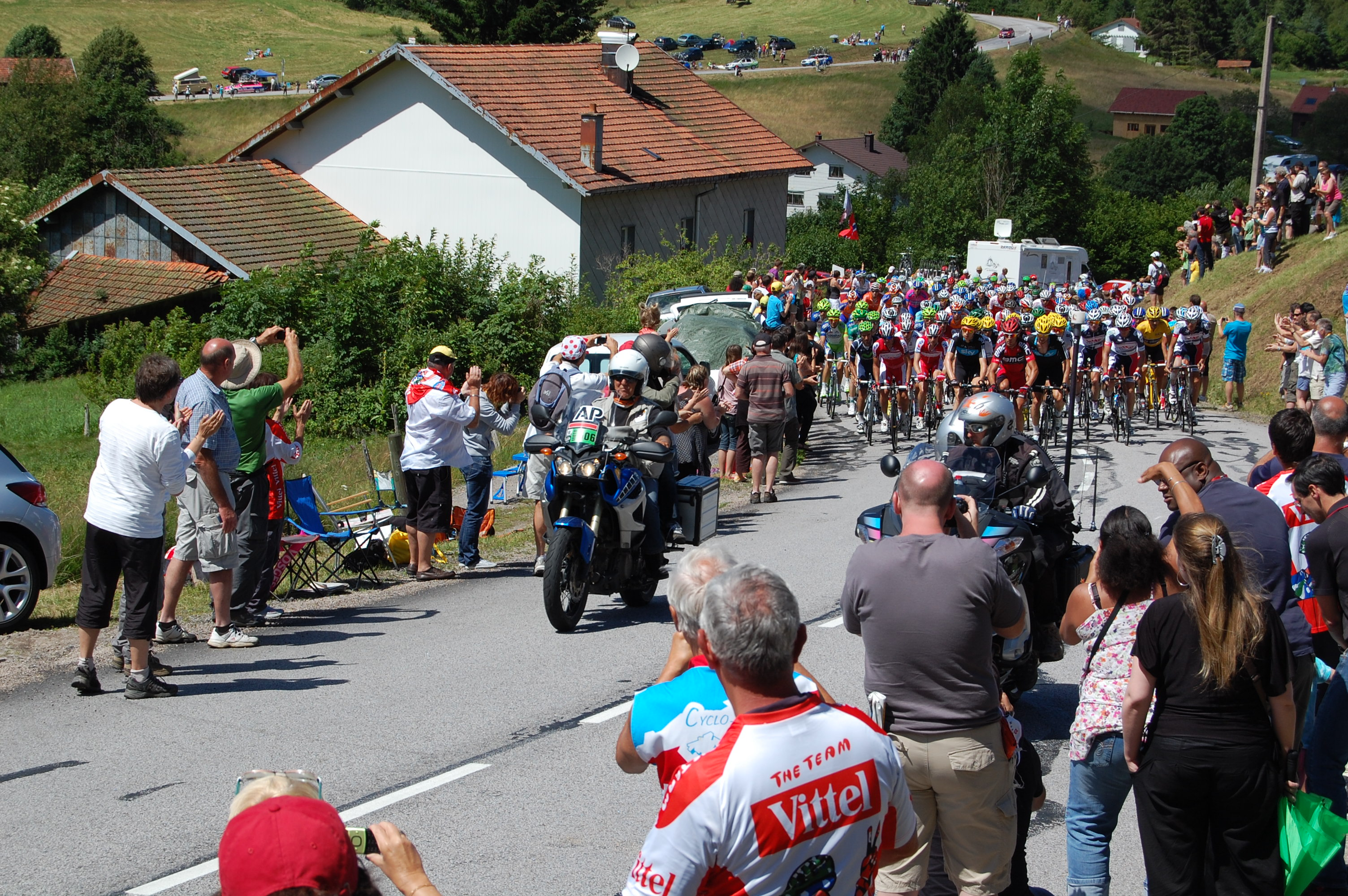
The peloton climbing the Col de Grosse Pierre on the seventh stage

An initial breakaway of nineteen riders went clear after 11 km (6.8 mi), but it was eventually reduced to seven riders, representing seven different teams, by the time the race reached the 20 km (12.4 mi) mark. They eventually established a lead of nearly six minutes around a third of the way through the stage; by the intermediate sprint point in Gérardmer, it had been reduced by a minute, as Cyril Gautier (Team Europcar) took the twenty points for first over the line, and Peter Sagan (Liquigas–Cannondale) extended his points lead by one, as he beat Matthew Goss (Orica–GreenEDGE) in the main field sprint, for eighth place. Saxo Bank–Tinkoff Bank's Chris Anker Sørensen crossed both of the third-category climbs first ahead of Rabobank's Luis León Sánchez, but the peloton started reducing their advantage by each passing kilometre. Astana's Dmitry Fofonov launched an attack at the front, which dislodged Gautier from the lead group; the peloton remained a minute in arrears, with Team Sky holding station and setting the tempo, protecting Bradley Wiggins from any danger.

Jurgen Van den Broeck of Lotto–Belisol, Movistar Team rider Alejandro Valverde, and Rabobank's Robert Gesink encountered difficulties at this point, and would lose over a minute by the end of the day. Sørensen and Orica–GreenEDGE's Michael Albasini were the last of the leaders to be caught, with just over 5 km (3.1 mi) remaining. Team Sky continued to break the peloton apart, and by the time the leaders had reached the flamme rouge, only five riders remained at the front – Wiggins and his teammate Chris Froome, BMC Racing Team's Cadel Evans, Liquigas–Cannondale rider Vincenzo Nibali and Rein Taaramäe of Cofidis – for the closing kilometre. Evans hit the final corner first, but Froome looked strongest on the steepest part of the climb, and he eventually went past him and Wiggins, accelerating away to a two-second time gap over his rivals. With RadioShack–Nissan's Fabian Cancellara losing almost two minutes on the day, he surrendered the yellow jersey to Wiggins, who became the fifth British rider to wear the jersey, and first since David Millar in 2000. Froome assumed the polka-dot jersey thanks to the stage victory, while Taaramäe took the white jersey from Evans' teammate Tejay van Garderen.

Stage 7 result
Rank	Rider	Team	Time
1	Chris Froome (GBR)	Team Sky	4h 58' 35"
2	Cadel Evans (AUS)	BMC Racing Team	+ 2"
3	Bradley Wiggins (GBR)	Team Sky	+ 2"
4	Vincenzo Nibali (ITA)	Liquigas–Cannondale	+ 7"
5	Rein Taaramäe (EST)	Cofidis	+ 19"
6	Haimar Zubeldia (ESP)	RadioShack–Nissan	+ 44"
7	Pierre Rolland (FRA)	Team Europcar	+ 46"
8	Janez Brajkovič (SLO)	Astana	+ 46"
DSQ	~~Denis Menchov (RUS)~~	~~Team Katusha~~	~~+ 50"~~
10	Maxime Monfort (BEL)	RadioShack–Nissan	+ 56"

General classification after stage 7
Rank	Rider	Team	Time
1	Bradley Wiggins (GBR)	Team Sky	34h 21' 20"
2	Cadel Evans (AUS)	BMC Racing Team	+ 10"
3	Vincenzo Nibali (ITA)	Liquigas–Cannondale	+ 16"
4	Rein Taaramäe (EST)	Cofidis	+ 32"
DSQ	~~Denis Menchov (RUS)~~	~~Team Katusha~~	~~+ 54"~~
6	Haimar Zubeldia (ESP)	RadioShack–Nissan	+ 59"
7	Maxime Monfort (BEL)	RadioShack–Nissan	+ 1' 09"
8	Nicolas Roche (IRL)	Ag2r–La Mondiale	+ 1' 22"
9	Chris Froome (GBR)	Team Sky	+ 1' 32"
10	Michael Rogers (AUS)	Team Sky	+ 1' 40"

== Stage 8 ==
8 July 2012 — Belfort to Porrentruy (Switzerland), 157.5 km (97.9 mi)

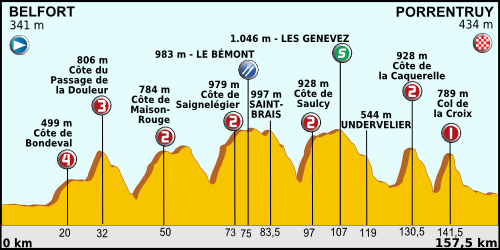
Stage eight profile

The race entered Switzerland after 65 km (40.4 mi) of the parcours, going through the Jura Mountains with a total of seven rated climbs including the first-category Col de la Croix – the summit of which was at 789 m (2,589 ft) after a 3.7 km (2.3 mi), 9.2% average gradient climb – 16 km (9.9 mi) before the finish in Porrentruy. Ten riders made the immediate breakaway from the peloton, but the gap that they had achieved was closed down by the Astana team ahead of the day's first climb, the Côte de Bondeval. Jens Voigt of RadioShack–Nissan attacked off the front of the lead group to take the point on offer for the mountains classification, and was joined by several more riders on the descent; however, the group only held a gap of twenty seconds at the 50 km (31.1 mi) mark.

Jérémy Roy attacked from the peloton for FDJ–BigMat, and soon caught and passed Voigt on the road; while in the peloton, Samuel Sánchez (Euskaltel–Euskadi) had to abandon the race, after crashing with teammate Jorge Azanza and Movistar Team's Alejandro Valverde, and suffered a fractured metacarpal in his left hand. Roy was joined by Astana rider Fredrik Kessiakoff on the day's fourth climb, the Côte de Saignelégier, while a 22-rider chase group formed behind the duo. Steven Kruijswijk (Rabobank) and Omega Pharma–Quick-Step's Kevin De Weert left that group, and soon joined up with the two leaders on the Côte de Saulcy, before Kessiakoff left them behind, after attacking once again. He held a lead of 1' 45" over the dwindling chase group on the penultimate climb, the Côte de la Caquerelle, and eventually the group had reduced to just French pairing Tony Gallopin (RadioShack–Nissan) and Roy's teammate Thibaut Pinot, the youngest rider in the Tour.

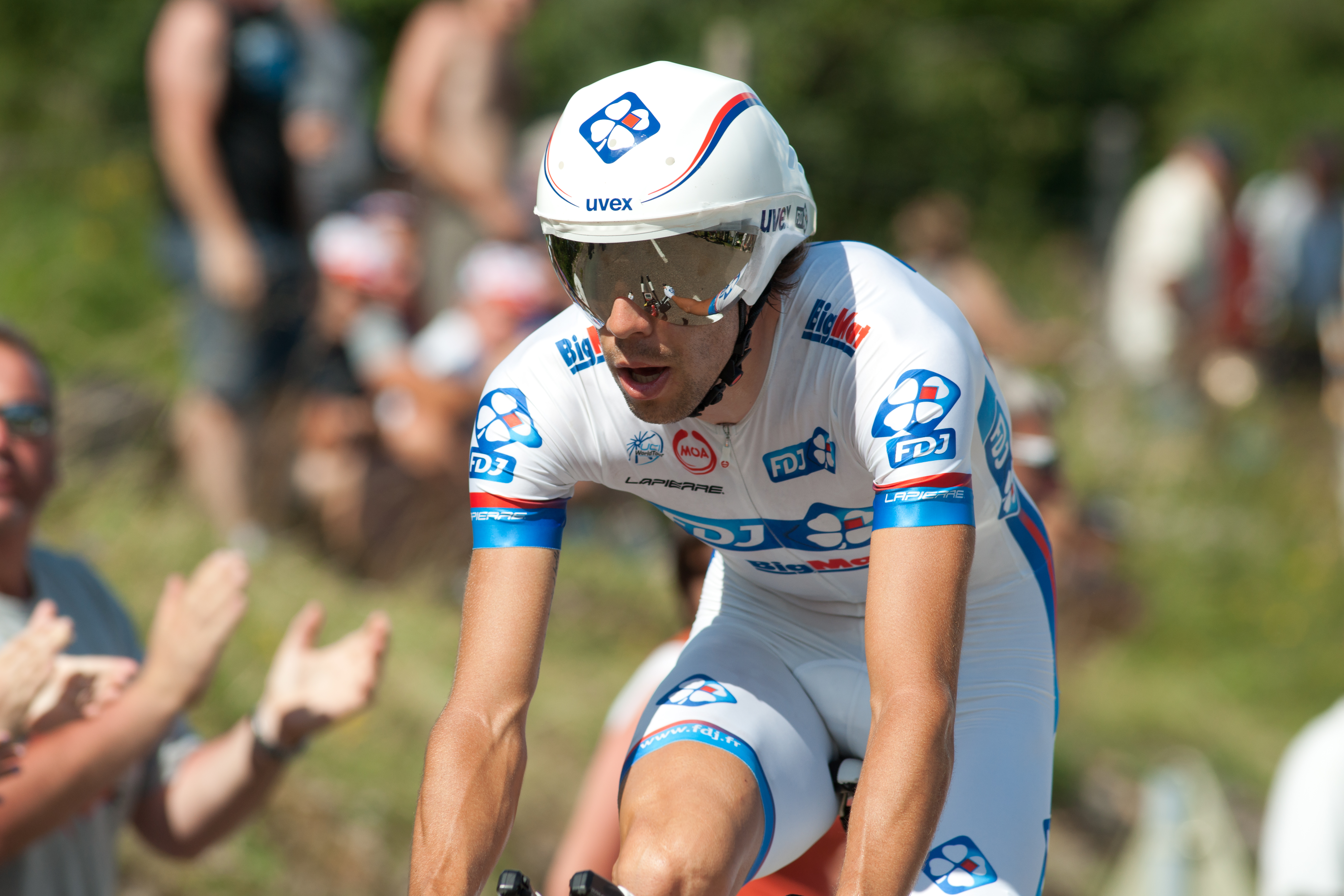
FDJ–BigMat's Thibaut Pinot (pictured in the next stage), the winner of stage eight

Gallopin lost ground to Pinot on the final climb, and soon Pinot was chasing after Kessiakoff on the climb itself; he ultimately caught him towards the summit of the climb. Kessiakoff could not stick with Pinot on the climb, with Pinot crossing the summit with a 12-second advantage over Kessiakoff. The group of overall contenders had also been reduced, with Lotto–Belisol's Jelle Vanendert setting the tempo for teammate Jurgen Van den Broeck, around a minute-and-a-half behind Pinot. With boisterous support from his team manager Marc Madiot, Pinot maintained an advantage of a minute into the final 5 km (3.1 mi), as Kessiakoff was swept up by the small chasing group. Van Den Broeck and Cadel Evans (BMC Racing Team) looked to go clear in the closing stages, but they were brought back; while at the front, Pinot soloed to a 26-second margin of victory, ahead of Evans, Gallopin and the rest of the group. Kessiakoff took the polka-dot jersey from Chris Froome (Team Sky), as Froome's teammate Bradley Wiggins maintained the overall lead into the following day's individual time trial.

Stage 8 result
Rank	Rider	Team	Time
1	Thibaut Pinot (FRA)	FDJ–BigMat	3h 56' 10"
2	Cadel Evans (AUS)	BMC Racing Team	+ 26"
3	Tony Gallopin (FRA)	RadioShack–Nissan	+ 26"
4	Bradley Wiggins (GBR)	Team Sky	+ 26"
5	Vincenzo Nibali (ITA)	Liquigas–Cannondale	+ 26"
6	Jurgen Van den Broeck (BEL)	Lotto–Belisol	+ 26"
7	Chris Froome (GBR)	Team Sky	+ 26"
DSQ	~~Denis Menchov (RUS)~~	~~Team Katusha~~	~~+ 26"~~
9	Haimar Zubeldia (ESP)	RadioShack–Nissan	+ 26"
10	Fränk Schleck (LUX)	RadioShack–Nissan	+ 30"

General classification after stage 8
Rank	Rider	Team	Time
1	Bradley Wiggins (GBR)	Team Sky	38h 17' 56"
2	Cadel Evans (AUS)	BMC Racing Team	+ 10"
3	Vincenzo Nibali (ITA)	Liquigas–Cannondale	+ 16"
DSQ	~~Denis Menchov (RUS)~~	~~Team Katusha~~	~~+ 54"~~
5	Haimar Zubeldia (ESP)	RadioShack–Nissan	+ 59"
6	Chris Froome (GBR)	Team Sky	+ 1' 32"
7	Maxime Monfort (BEL)	RadioShack–Nissan	+ 2' 08"
8	Jurgen Van den Broeck (BEL)	Lotto–Belisol	+ 2' 11"
9	Nicolas Roche (IRL)	Ag2r–La Mondiale	+ 2' 21"
10	Rein Taaramäe (EST)	Cofidis	+ 2' 27"

== Stage 9 ==
9 July 2012 — Arc-et-Senans to Besançon, 41.5 km (25.8 mi), (ITT)

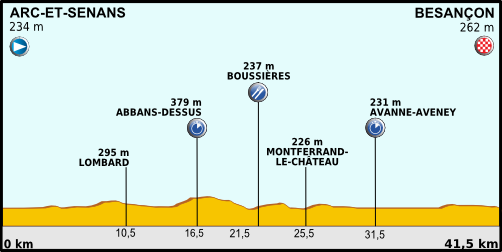
Stage nine profile

The first of two lengthy individual time trial stages was fairly flat with rolling hills in the early kilometres before the parcours entered the valley of the River Doubs at Boussières. It was expected that the main contenders for the general classification were to emerge after this stage. As was customary of time trial stages, the riders set off in reverse order from where they were ranked in the general classification at the end of the previous stage. Thus, Brice Feillu of Saur–Sojasun, who, in 178th place, trailed overall leader Bradley Wiggins (Team Sky) by one hour, eleven minutes and thirty-nine seconds, was the first rider to set off on the stage. Feillu ultimately recorded a time of 57' 33" for the course, which was not bettered until the thirteenth rider to complete the course, Vacansoleil–DCM rider Gustav Larsson, who recorded a time over three minutes quicker than Feillu.

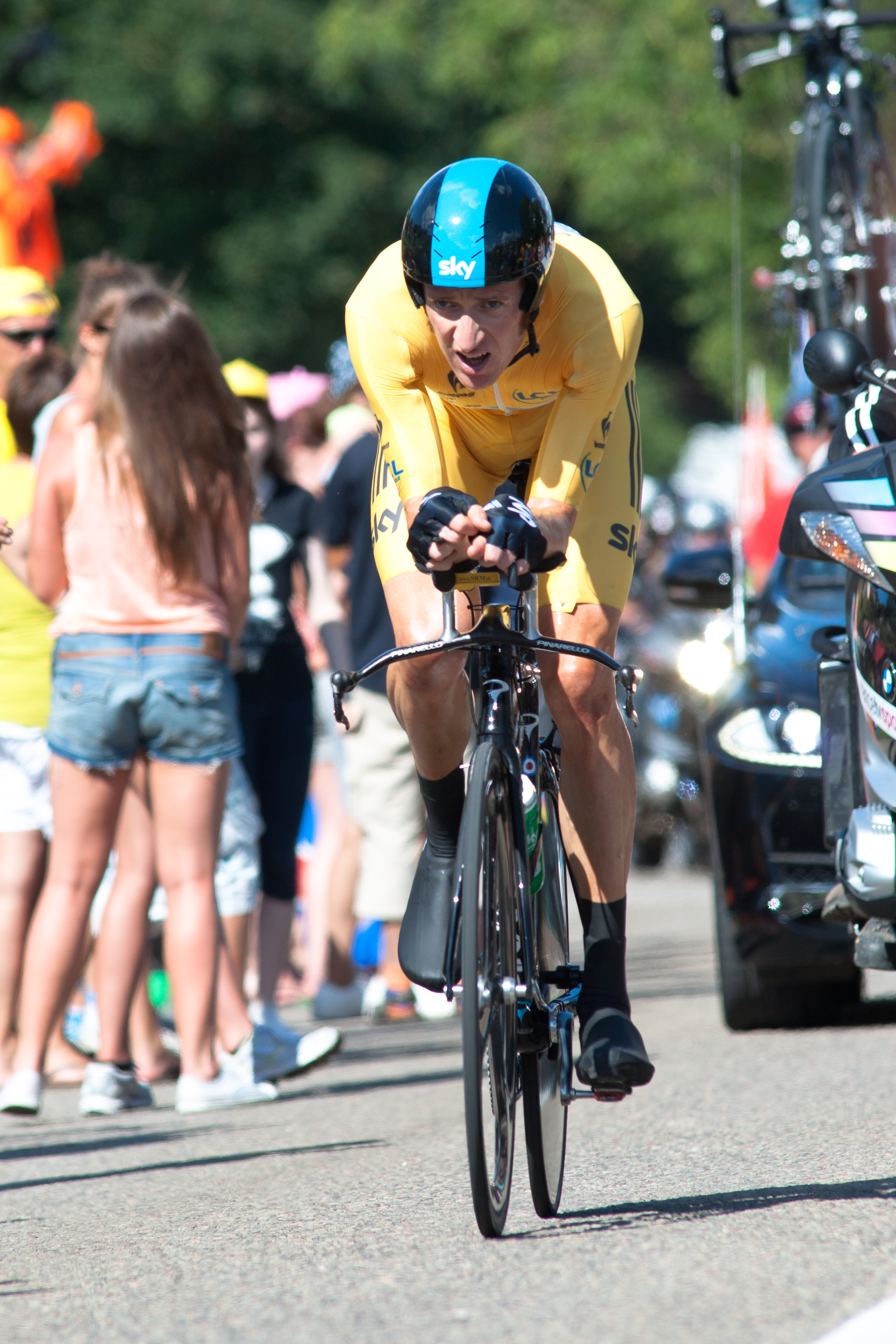
Overall leader Bradley Wiggins won his first career Tour de France stage, and as a result, he extended his lead in the general classification to 1' 53" over BMC Racing Team's Cadel Evans.

He completed the course in a time of 54' 19", and his time held for around an hour before his teammate Lieuwe Westra assumed top spot; despite being ten seconds down on Larsson at the second intermediate time point, Westra completed the final portion of the course some twenty seconds quicker, and recorded a time of 54' 09". Omega Pharma–Quick-Step's Tony Martin, the world champion, was the next rider to assume the top spot, setting the first time underneath 54 minutes; he set a time of 53' 40", despite riding with a fractured scaphoid bone in his left wrist and suffering a flat tyre in the opening 5 km (3.1 mi) of the stage. Fabian Cancellara of RadioShack–Nissan improved the quickest time benchmark; he set the fastest time at each of the two intermediate time points on the stage, and having passed the rider who started three minutes before him on the road, Rabobank's Bauke Mollema, Cancellara established a time for the course of 52' 21", beating Martin's time by 1' 19".

His time was threatened by BMC Racing Team rider Tejay van Garderen, as he went beneath the time of Cancellara at each of the intermediate time checks, but faded towards the end and fell nine seconds outside of his target. Ultimately, only two riders beat Cancellara's time, both riding for Team Sky. Chris Froome improved upon van Garderen's times at the splits, but maintained his pace until the end, setting a time half a second inside 52 minutes, beating Cancellara's time by 22 seconds. Wiggins went even quicker and by the time he had finished, he had put 35 seconds into his teammate with a time of 51' 24", winning his first Tour stage. Wiggins also put substantial time into his major general classification rivals, as the margin on the day ranged between 1' 43" for Cadel Evans (BMC Racing Team) who finished sixth on the stage, and 3' 29" for Cofidis rider Rein Taaramäe, who was 28th and lost the white jersey as leader of the young rider classification to van Garderen.

Stage 9 result
Rank	Rider	Team	Time
1	Bradley Wiggins (GBR)	Team Sky	51' 24"
2	Chris Froome (GBR)	Team Sky	+ 35"
3	Fabian Cancellara (SUI)	RadioShack–Nissan	+ 57"
4	Tejay van Garderen (USA)	BMC Racing Team	+ 1' 06"
5	Sylvain Chavanel (FRA)	Omega Pharma–Quick-Step	+ 1' 24"
6	Cadel Evans (AUS)	BMC Racing Team	+ 1' 43"
7	Peter Velits (SVK)	Omega Pharma–Quick-Step	+ 1' 59"
8	Vincenzo Nibali (ITA)	Liquigas–Cannondale	+ 2' 07"
DSQ	~~Denis Menchov (RUS)~~	~~Team Katusha~~	~~+ 2' 08"~~
10	Andreas Klöden (GER)	RadioShack–Nissan	+ 2' 09"

General slassification after stage 9
Rank	Rider	Team	Time
1	Bradley Wiggins (GBR)	Team Sky	39h 09' 20"
2	Cadel Evans (AUS)	BMC Racing Team	+ 1' 53"
3	Chris Froome (GBR)	Team Sky	+ 2' 07"
4	Vincenzo Nibali (ITA)	Liquigas–Cannondale	+ 2' 23"
DSQ	~~Denis Menchov (RUS)~~	~~Team Katusha~~	~~+ 3' 02"~~
6	Haimar Zubeldia (ESP)	RadioShack–Nissan	+ 3' 19"
7	Maxime Monfort (BEL)	RadioShack–Nissan	+ 4' 23"
8	Tejay van Garderen (USA)	BMC Racing Team	+ 5' 14"
9	Jurgen Van den Broeck (BEL)	Lotto–Belisol	+ 5' 20"
10	Nicolas Roche (IRL)	Ag2r–La Mondiale	+ 5' 29"

== Stage 10 ==
11 July 2012 — Mâcon to Bellegarde-sur-Valserine, 194.5 km (120.9 mi)

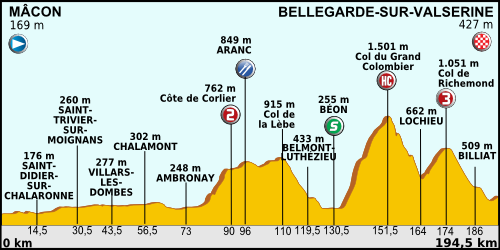
Stage ten profile

After a rest day, the Tour remained in the Jura Mountains, with much of the day's route the same as that followed on stage five of the 2012 Critérium du Dauphiné, including the Tour's first passage over the hors catégorie climb of the Col du Grand Colombier; a 17.4 km (10.8 mi) long climb, reaching an altitude of 1,501 m (4,925 ft) at an average gradient of 7.1%, but with sections in excess of 12%. The Tour then passed over the 1,051 m (3,448 ft) Col de Richemond, 20.5 km (12.7 mi) before the finish; the race descended towards Billiat before a gradual uphill finish in Bellegarde-sur-Valserine.

Several small attacks occurred in the early kilometres of the stage, and the peloton allowed the riders to establish an advantage off the front of the main field. It eventually amounted to some twenty-five riders in the breakaway, including Lampre–ISD rider Michele Scarponi – the highest-placed rider in the group, some ten minutes in arrears of race leader Bradley Wiggins (Team Sky) – and the top two riders in the points classification, Liquigas–Cannondale's Peter Sagan and Matthew Goss of Orica–GreenEDGE. After Saxo Bank–Tinkoff Bank's Michael Mørkøv took maximum points over the first climb of the day, the Côte de Corlier, the next focus was on the intermediate sprint point at Béon; Sagan launched his sprint first but was beaten to the line by both Goss and FDJ–BigMat's Yauheni Hutarovich, with Goss reducing Sagan's lead in the standings to 27 points. The breakaway group split apart on the Col du Grand Colombier; only Scarponi, Team Europcar's Thomas Voeckler, Rabobank rider Luis León Sánchez and Dries Devenyns of Omega Pharma–Quick-Step remained at the front.

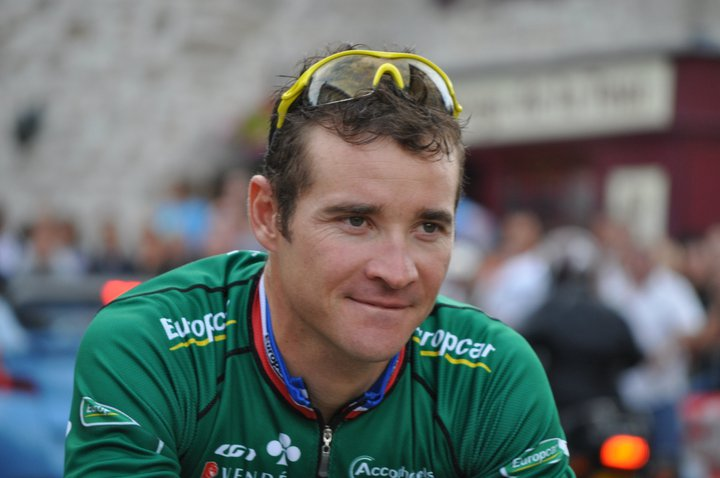
Stage ten winner, Thomas Voeckler of Team Europcar (pictured in 2011)

Voeckler crossed the summit of the climb first, taking the 25 points on offer for the hors catégorie climb. The peloton crossed five-and-a-half minutes later. Voeckler also took maximum points at the Col de Richemond, and as a result, took the polka-dot jersey for the mountains classification lead from Astana rider Fredrik Kessiakoff. Sagan had dropped back to aid his teammate Vincenzo Nibali, who had attacked on the descent of the Col du Grand Colombier, but both riders were not to stay in front ahead of the Team Sky-led peloton. RadioShack–Nissan's Jens Voigt made up a minute on the lead quartet to join them, with around 10 km (6.2 mi) remaining; Devenyns looked to go clear in the closing stages, but Voeckler had kept most in hand to take his third career Tour stage victory, three seconds ahead of Scarponi and seven ahead of Voigt. Wiggins remained on the wheel of his closest rival, Cadel Evans of the BMC Racing Team, to maintain his 1' 53" lead in the general classification into the Alps.

Stage 10 result
Rank	Rider	Team	Time
1	Thomas Voeckler (FRA)	Team Europcar	4h 46' 26"
2	Michele Scarponi (ITA)	Lampre–ISD	+ 3"
3	Jens Voigt (GER)	RadioShack–Nissan	+ 7"
4	Luis León Sánchez (ESP)	Rabobank	+ 23"
5	Dries Devenyns (BEL)	Omega Pharma–Quick-Step	+ 30"
6	Sandy Casar (FRA)	FDJ–BigMat	+ 2' 44"
7	Egoi Martínez (ESP)	Euskaltel–Euskadi	+ 2' 44"
8	Pierre Rolland (FRA)	Team Europcar	+ 2' 44"
9	Jurgen Van den Broeck (BEL)	Lotto–Belisol	+ 2' 44"
10	Dmitry Fofonov (KAZ)	Astana	+ 2' 52"

General classification after stage 10
Rank	Rider	Team	Time
1	Bradley Wiggins (GBR)	Team Sky	43h 59' 02"
2	Cadel Evans (AUS)	BMC Racing Team	+ 1' 53"
3	Chris Froome (GBR)	Team Sky	+ 2' 07"
4	Vincenzo Nibali (ITA)	Liquigas–Cannondale	+ 2' 23"
DSQ	~~Denis Menchov (RUS)~~	~~Team Katusha~~	~~+ 3' 02"~~
6	Haimar Zubeldia (ESP)	RadioShack–Nissan	+ 3' 19"
7	Maxime Monfort (BEL)	RadioShack–Nissan	+ 4' 23"
8	Jurgen Van den Broeck (BEL)	Lotto–Belisol	+ 4' 48"
9	Nicolas Roche (IRL)	Ag2r–La Mondiale	+ 5' 29"
10	Tejay van Garderen (USA)	BMC Racing Team	+ 5' 31"

== Notes and references ==
=== Sources ===
- "Race regulations" (PDF). Tour de France. Amaury Sport Organisation. 2015. Archived from the original (PDF) on 14 July 2015.
