= Casemate de Marckolsheim Sud =

- Part of Maginot Line Rhine fortifications
- Northeast France
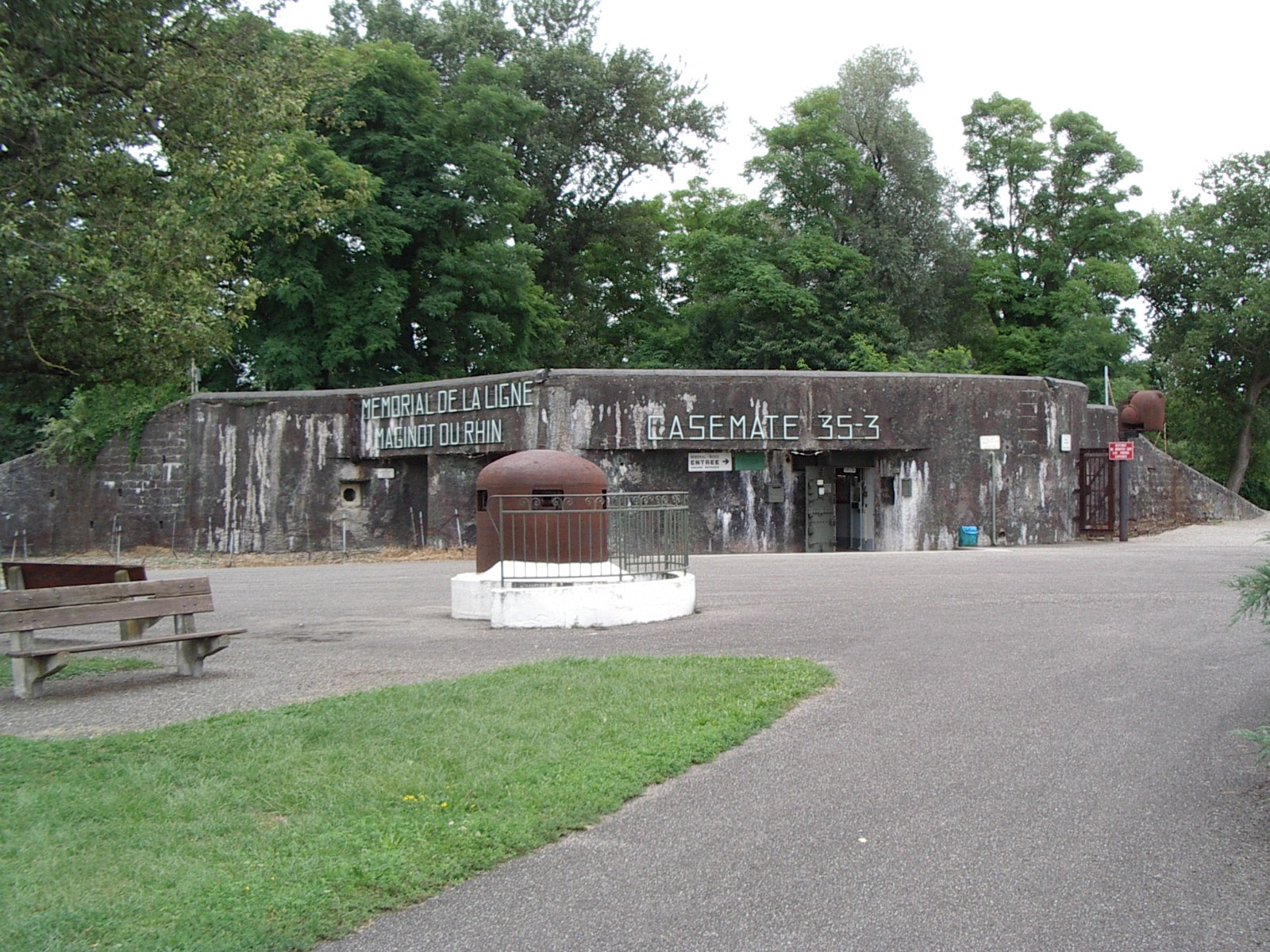

Site information
- Controlled by: France
- Open to the public: Yes
- Condition: Preserved

Location
- Coordinates: 48.15774°N 7.55589°E

Site history
- Built by: CORF
- Materials: Concrete, steel
- Battles/wars: Battle of France

The Casemate de Marckolsheim Sud is a pre-World War II fortified position near the Rhine river in eastern France. The casemate was part of an extension of the Maginot Line fortifications along France's border with Germany. As a unit of the Fortified Sector of Colmar, the casemate was part of French defenses during the German assault of 15–18 June 1940, Operation Kleiner Bär. It has been preserved and is part of a museum focusing on the Rhine section of the Maginot Line. The museum is located at the eastern edge of the town of Marckolsheim.

== Concept and design ==
Marckolsheim Sud's numerical designator was 35/3, referring to its place in the third, or "village" line of fortifications, about 2 kilometres (1.2 mi) back from the river bank. It was built in the mid-1930s by the Commission d'Organisation des Régions Fortifiées (CORF), which was responsible for the major fortifications of the Maginot Line.

Unlike other portions of the Maginot Line, the Rhine defenses were not interconnected, consisting of individual casemates or blockhouses a few hundred meters apart, arranged to fire along the length of the defended frontier. The Marckolsheim Sud casemate is a double casemate, designed to fire laterally in either direction along the front, supporting its neighbors to the north and south. The position was armed with two twin heavy machine guns, type JM and, two 47mm anti-tank gun/JM combinations, one of each firing laterally. The faces of these firing positions were defended by two automatic rifle embrasures. A further automatic rifle position defended the casemate's entrance. On top of the fort, two cupolas or cloches were situated to fire in all directions, with a JM cloche mounted centrally and a GFM automatic rifle cloche to one side. The Marckolsheim Sud casemate, and its companion, Marckolsheim Nord, were not typical of the sector, being somewhat larger than most, with two cloches rather than the usual single GFM cloche. The design category was "SBFM special."

== 1940 ==
See Fortified Sector of Colmar for a broader discussion of the Colmar sector of the French defenses.

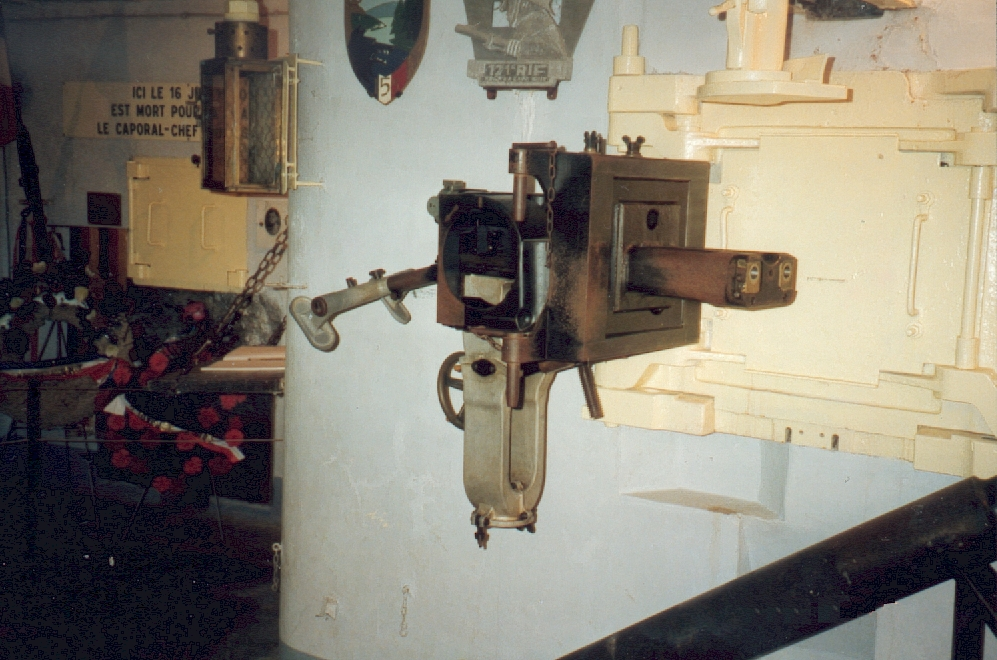
JM machine gun

Marckolsheim Sud was commanded in 1940 by Lieutenant Marois of the French 42nd Fortress Infantry Regiment. On 15–17 June, the sector was attacked by German forces of the German 360th Infantry Regiment, 221st Infantry Division. Marckolsheim Sud and Nord put up particularly fierce resistance to German attack. The Germans brought up 8.8 cm guns, disabling one cloche, and called in Stuka attacks, which buried the other in debris from bomb blasts. Without the means to defend itself in all directions, and with German assault teams throwing explosives into the casemate openings, the garrison was forced to surrender on the 17th.

== Museum ==
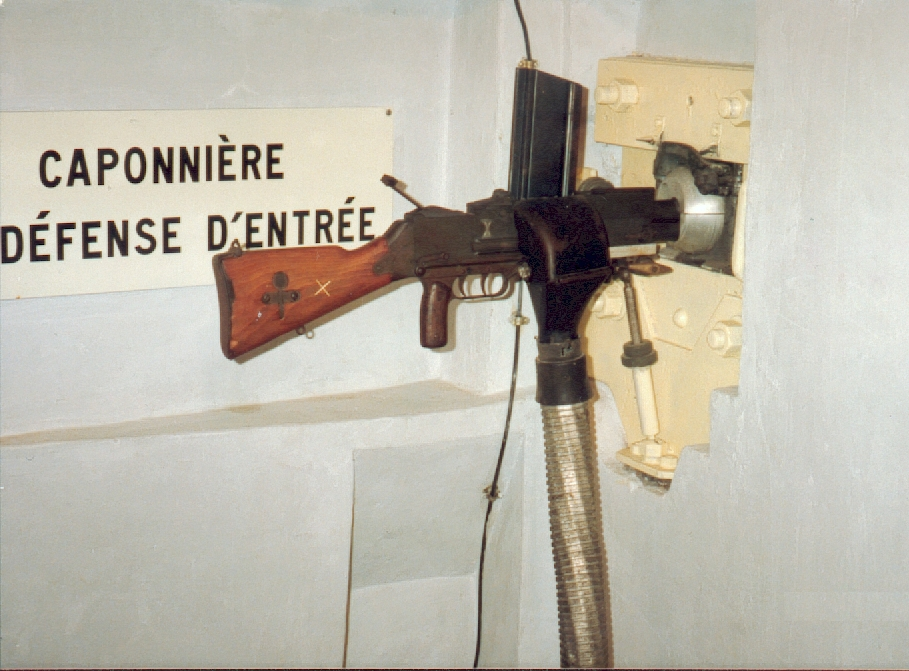
Automatic rifle embrasure

Marckolsheim Sud was restored in 1972 and houses a museum, the Musée Mémorial de la Ligne Maginot du Rhin.

== Bibliography ==
- Allcorn, William. The Maginot Line 1928-45. Oxford: Osprey Publishing, 2003. ISBN 1-84176-646-1
- Degon, André; Zylberyng, Didier, "La Ligne Maginot: Guide des Forts à Visiter," Editions Ouest-France, 2014. ISBN 978-2-7373-6080-0 (in French)
- Kaufmann, J.E. and Kaufmann, H.W. Fortress France: The Maginot Line and French Defenses in World War II, Stackpole Books, 2006. ISBN 0-275-98345-5
- Kaufmann, J.E., Kaufmann, H.W., Jancovič-Potočnik, A. and Lang, P. The Maginot Line: History and Guide, Pen and Sword, 2011. ISBN 978-1-84884-068-3
- Mary, Jean-Yves; Hohnadel, Alain; Sicard, Jacques. Hommes et Ouvrages de la Ligne Maginot, Tome 1. Paris, Histoire & Collections, 2001. ISBN 2-908182-88-2 (in French)
- Mary, Jean-Yves; Hohnadel, Alain; Sicard, Jacques. Hommes et Ouvrages de la Ligne Maginot, Tome 2. Paris, Histoire & Collections, 2003. ISBN 2-908182-97-1 (in French)
- Mary, Jean-Yves; Hohnadel, Alain; Sicard, Jacques. Hommes et Ouvrages de la Ligne Maginot, Tome 3. Paris, Histoire & Collections, 2003. ISBN 2-913903-88-6 (in French)
- Mary, Jean-Yves; Hohnadel, Alain; Sicard, Jacques. Hommes et Ouvrages de la Ligne Maginot, Tome 5. Paris, Histoire & Collections, 2009. ISBN 978-2-35250-127-5 (in French)
