= Fortified Sector of Mulhouse =

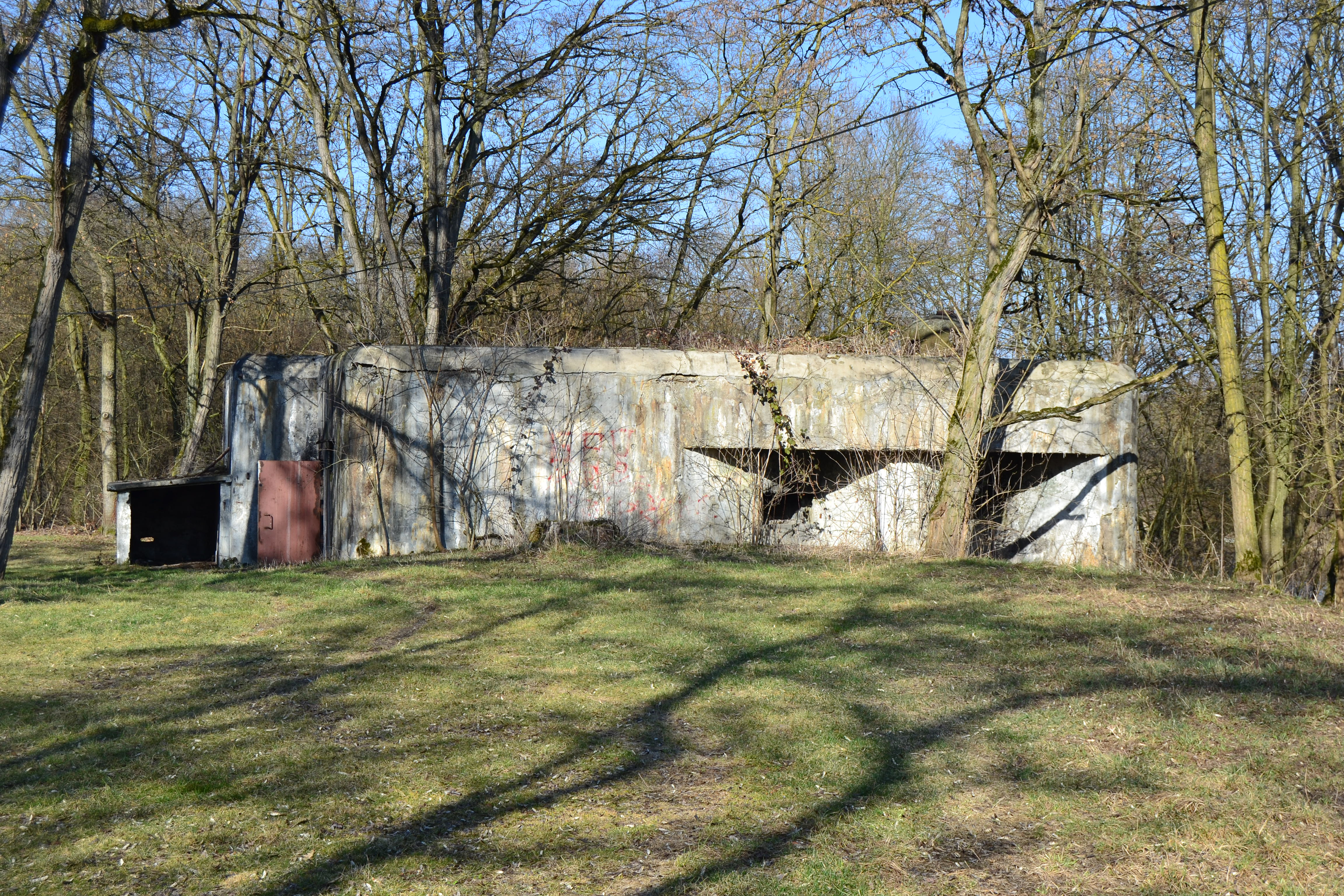
Casemate 11/1 Chalampé-Berge-Nord.

The Fortified Sector of Mulhouse (Secteur Fortifié de Mulhouse) was the French military organization that in 1940 controlled the section of the French frontier with Germany in the vicinity of Mulhouse. The sector's principal defense was the Rhine itself, which could be crossed only by boat or by seizing a bridge crossing. The sector's fortifications chiefly took the form of casemates and blockhouses. The sector did not see significant action during the Battle of France, since the German crossings of the Rhine took place further north, near Colmar. The fortifications in the sector were built as part of the overall plan for the Maginot Line, but did not include the major fortified positions that characterized the Maginot Line of northeastern France. The sector did not see significant fighting in World War II. It was bordered to the north by the Fortified Sector of Colmar and on the south by the Fortified Sector of Altkirch.

== Concept and organization ==
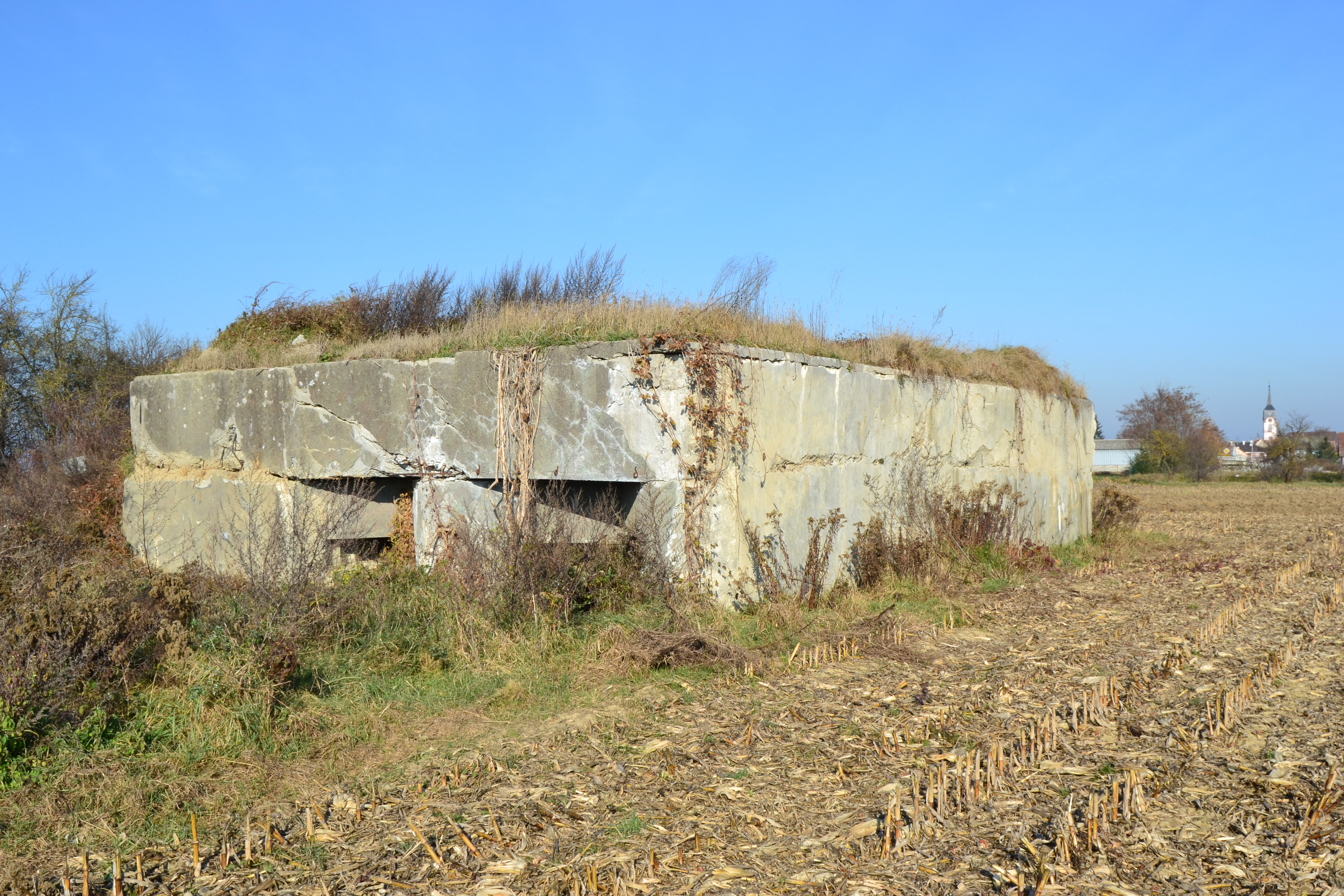
Casemate de Bantzenheim

The fortifications of the Mulhouse sector were laid out in two major lines, one right on the Rhine, and another to the rear on the eastern edge of the Hardt forest. No fortifications were established south of Hombourg, owing to the provisions of the 1815 Congress of Vienna treaty, which forbade permanent fortifications within 12 kilometres (7.5 mi) of Basel. Two positions were placed between the front and rear lines, and were considered a second line. The fortifications consisted entirely of casemates and blockhouses, constructed by the Commission d'Organisation des Régions Fortifiées (CORF), CORF was responsible for the major fortifications of the Maginot Line, but in this area no major positions or ouvrages were built. The Hardt forest was regarded as a significant obstacle between the third line and Mulhouse.

The riverbank fortifications were of a basic nature, with protection only up to 155mm caliber, machine gun armament and no electrical system. The second and third lines were more robust in construction and equipment, with electric generators and anti-tank weapons. The heaviest concentration of fortifications were in the area of Neuf-Brisach, itself a preserved fortress from the Vauban era. Neuf-Brisach guarded a strategic bridge across the Rhine.

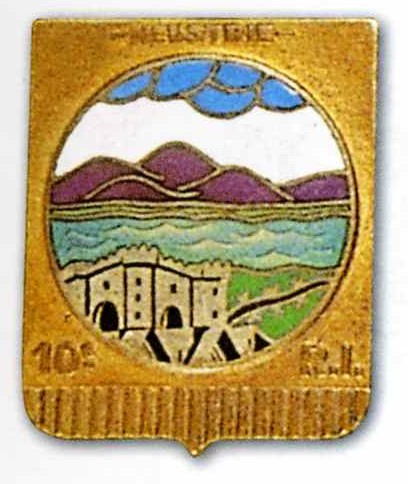
Insignia of the 10th RIF.

== Command ==
The Mulhouse sector was under the overall command of the French 8th Army, which was in turn under the French 3rd Army Group. The SF Mulhouse was commanded by General Didio, with a command post at Rixheim. The fortifications were manned by the 10th Fortress Infantry Regiment. The interval troops, the army formations that were to provide the mobile defense for the sector, to support and be supported by the fixed defenses, were under the command of the 13th Corps (13e Corps d'Armee), General Misserey, commander. Artillery support for the sector was provided by the 159th Position Artillery Regiment (Régiment d'Artillerie de Position (RAP)).

From 16 March 1940 the SF Mulhouse was designated the 105th Fortress Infantry Division, or "Mulhouse Division." At the midpoint of the Battle of France on 1 June 1940, the fortress troops of the 105th DIF amounted to one fortress infantry regiment (10th RIF) in three battalions, comprising 135 officers and 4,500 men.

== Description ==
The sector includes, in order from north to south, the following significant casemates and infantry shelters (abris) in each sub-sector:

=== Sub-sector of Schliebach ===
10th Fortress Infantry Regiment (10e Régiment d'Infanterie de Forteresse (RIF)), Lt. Colonel Thiervoz

==== First line ====
- Casemate de Chalampé-le-Bas (14/1)
- Casemate de Ameisengründ (13b/1)
- Casemate de Chalampé-Berge Nord (11/1)
- Abri du Pont-de-Bateaux-de-Chalampé (10/1)
- Abri du Pont-Rail-de-Chalampé (8b/1)
- Abri du Pont-Rail-de-Chalampé Nord (8/1)
- Abri du Pont-Rail-de-Chalampé Sud(7/1)
- Casemate de Chalampé-Berge-Sud (6/1)

==== Second line ====
- Casemate Nord-Ouest (34/2)
- Casemate Sud-Ouest (35/2)

==== Third Line ====
- Casemate de Rumesheim Nord (56/3)
- Casemate de Rumersheim Sud (57/3)
- Casemate de Bantzenheim Nord (58/3)
- Casemate de Bantzenheim Sud (59/3)
- Casemate d'Ottmarsheim Nord (60/3)
- Casemate d'Ottmarsheim Sud (61/3)
- Casemate de Hombourg Nord (62/3)
- Casemate de Hombourg Sud (63/3)
- Blockhaus de Hardt Sud (76)
- Blockhaus de Sauruntz (77)

Peacetime barracks and support: Boutzenheim and Kembs

== Battle of France ==
The German offensive (Operation Kleiner Bär) across the Rhine was concentrated in the area near and to the north of Colmar, with little fighting in the Altkirch sector. The offensive, launched on 15 June, was rendered unimportant when the German XIX Corps under General Heinz Guderian reached the Swiss border on 17 June, behind the main French line.

The riverside positions were evacuated on 16 June, with a general withdrawal of the 105th DIF into the Vosges on 18 June, regrouping in the Markstein area. An attempt was made to defend Kruth, but were dislodged with many captured by the Germans. Remnants fell back to the Col de Stiftkopf on the 22nd, then the Rouge-Gazon farm where they were finally captured on 26 June.

=== Units ===
The 10th Fortress Infantry Regiment was the principal operational unit in the SF Mulhouse, and its operations in June mirrored those of its parent unit, the 105th DIF.

== Present situation ==
Most of the Rhine defenses were simply abandoned after World War II. Most of the first line of blockhouses on the banks of the river were destroyed when the river was widened as part of navigational improvements in the 1970s.

== Bibliography ==
- Allcorn, William. The Maginot Line 1928-45. Oxford: Osprey Publishing, 2003. ISBN 1-84176-646-1
- Degon, André; Zylberyng, Didier, La Ligne Maginot: Guide des Forts à Visiter, Editions Ouest-France, 2014. ISBN 978-2-7373-6080-0 (in French)
- Kaufmann, J.E. and Kaufmann, H.W. Fortress France: The Maginot Line and French Defenses in World War II, Stackpole Books, 2006. ISBN 0-275-98345-5
- Kaufmann, J.E., Kaufmann, H.W., Jancovič-Potočnik, A. and Lang, P. The Maginot Line: History and Guide, Pen and Sword, 2011. ISBN 978-1-84884-068-3
- Mary, Jean-Yves; Hohnadel, Alain; Sicard, Jacques. Hommes et Ouvrages de la Ligne Maginot, Tome 1. Paris, Histoire & Collections, 2001. ISBN 2-908182-88-2 (in French)
- Mary, Jean-Yves; Hohnadel, Alain; Sicard, Jacques. Hommes et Ouvrages de la Ligne Maginot, Tome 3. Paris, Histoire & Collections, 2003. ISBN 2-913903-88-6 (in French)
- Mary, Jean-Yves; Hohnadel, Alain; Sicard, Jacques. Hommes et Ouvrages de la Ligne Maginot, Tome 5. Paris, Histoire & Collections, 2009. ISBN 978-2-35250-127-5 (in French)
- Romanych, Marc; Rupp, Martin. Maginot Line 1940: Battles on the French Frontier. Oxford: Osprey Publishing, 2010. ISBN 1-84176-646-1
