= Fortified Sector of Colmar =

French defense fortifications

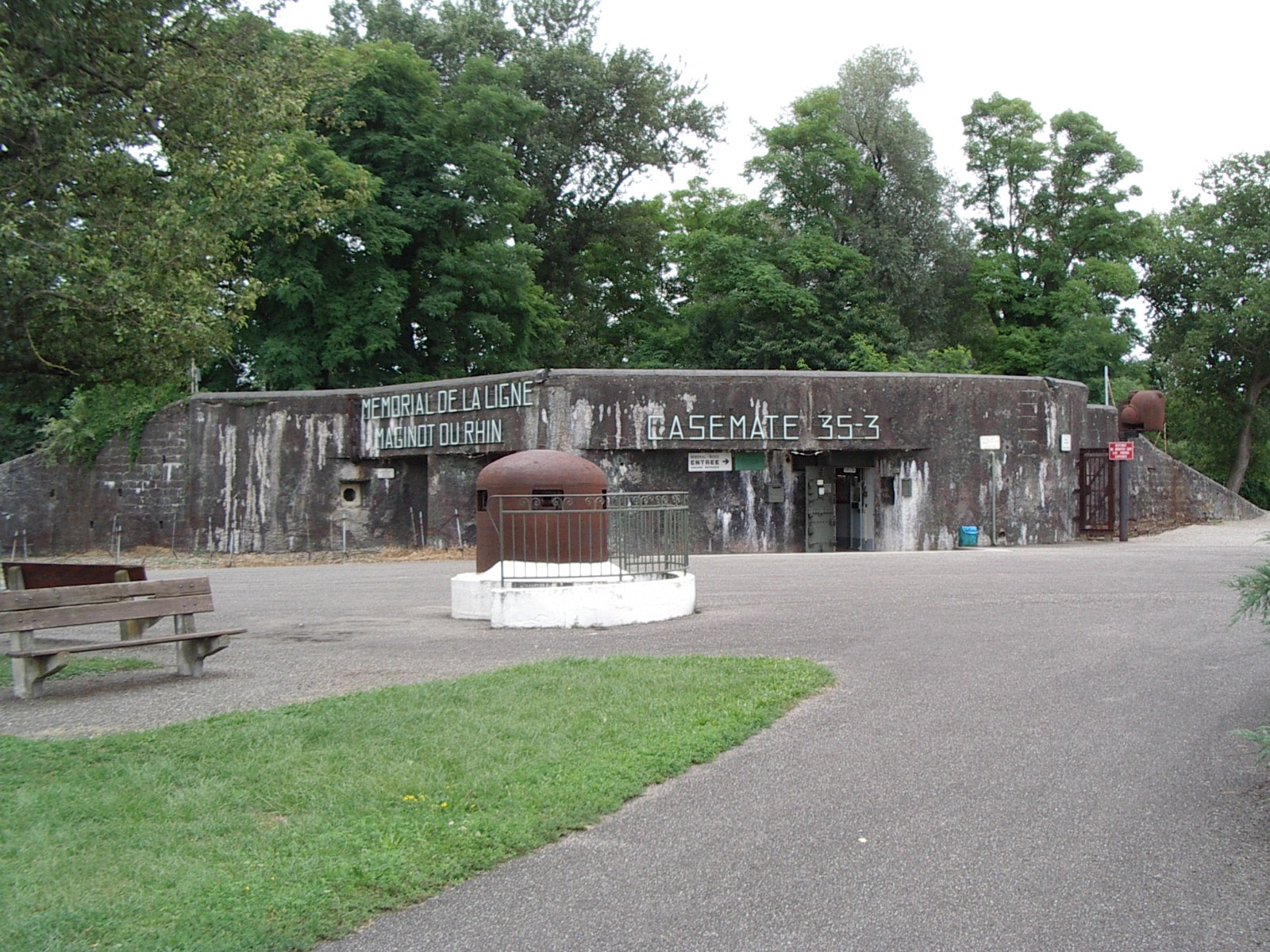
Marckolsheim casemate

The Fortified Sector of Colmar (Secteur Fortifié de Colmar) was the French military organization that in 1940 controlled the section of the French frontier with Germany in the vicinity of Colmar. The fortifications were built as part of France's Maginot Line defensive strategy, but the sector lacks the large interconnected fortifications found along France's land border with Germany. The sector's principal defense was the Rhine itself, which could be crossed only by boat or by seizing a bridge crossing. The sector's fortifications chiefly took the form of casemates and blockhouses. The SF Colmar was flanked to the north by the Fortified Sector of the Lower Rhine to the north and the Fortified Sector of Mulhouse to the south. The Colmar sector was directly attacked by German forces on 15 June 1940, capturing or destroying most of the fortifications in the sector in three days.

== Concept and organization ==
The Maginot Rhine defenses employed three lines of defense, with blockhouses or casemates close to the Rhine (the first line), backed by infantry shelters (the second line). The third line was a strong series of casemates, built on the model of interval casemates in the northeastern sections of the Line, but without lower levels. All of the Colmar fortifications were built in the mid-1930s by the Commission d'Organisation des Régions Fortifiées (CORF). CORF was responsible for the major fortifications of the Maginot Line, but in this area no major positions or ouvrages were built.

The riverbank fortifications were of a basic nature, with protection only up to 155 mm caliber, machine gun armament and no electrical system. The second and third lines were more robust in construction and equipment, with electric generators and anti-tank weapons. The heaviest concentration of fortifications was in the area of Neuf-Brisach, itself a preserved fortress from the Vauban era. Neuf-Brisach guarded a strategic bridge across the Rhine.

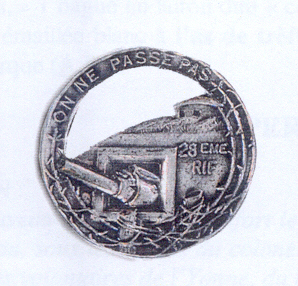
Insignia of the 28th RIF.

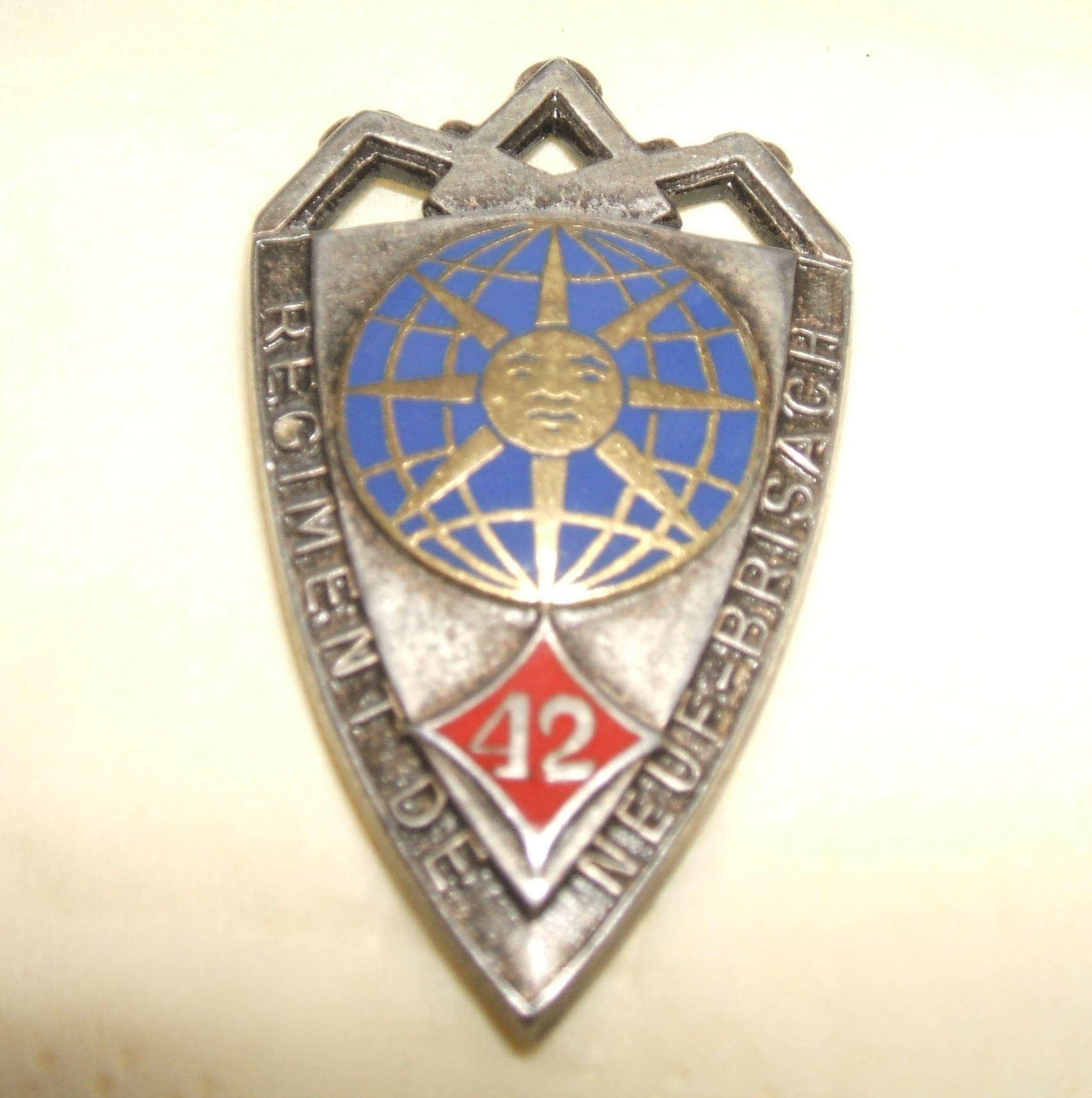
Insignia of the 42nd RIF.

== Command ==
The Colmar sector was under the overall command of the French 8th Army, which was in turn part of Army Group 3 under General Besson. The SF Colmar was commanded by General Coradin, then General Poisot and finally General Cousse from 1 January 1940. The command post was at Colmar. The interval troops, the army formations that were to provide the mobile defense for the sector and to be supported by the fixed defenses, were under the command of the 13th Corps (13e Corps d'Armee), General Misserey, commander. The primary interval formation was the 54th Infantry Division. Artillery support for the sector was provided by the first battalion of the 170th Position Artillery Regiment (Régiment d'Artillerie de Position (RAP)), which controlled both fixed and mobile artillery, commanded by Chef d'Escadron Maigret. The 54th ID was a Class B reserve formation, not suitable for sustained or heavy combat.

From 16 March 1940, the SF Colmar was designated the 104th Fortress Infantry Division, or "Colmar Division," incorporating the 9th and 10th battalions of the Chasseurs Pyrénéens. At the midpoint of the Battle of France on 1 June 1940, the fortress troops of the 104th DIF amounted to two fortress infantry regiments in four battalions and one regular infantry regiment in three battalions, comprising 300 officers and 10,300 men.

== Description ==
The sector includes, in order from west to east, the following major fortified positions, together with the most significant casemates and infantry shelters (abris) in each sub-sector.

=== Sub-sector of Elsenheim ===
42nd Fortress Infantry Regiment (42e Régiment d'Infanterie de Forteresse (RIF)), Lt. Colonel Fonlupt.

==== First line (riverbank line) ====
- Abri de Léopold (53/1)
- Abri de Schoenau Nord (52/1)
- Abri de Schoenau Sud (51/1)
- Casemate de Limbourg Nord (49/1)
- Abri de Limbourg Pont (46a/1)
- Casemate de Limbourg Sud (46/1)
- Casemate de Sponeck Nord (45/1)
- Casemate de Spondeck Pont (44/1) (not built)
- Casemate de Elswaserkopf (40/1)

==== Second line (infantry shelter line) ====
- Abri de Schoenau Petit-Rhin (15/2)
- Abri de Limbourg-Ferme (16/2)
- Abri de Sponeck Auberge (18/2)

==== Third line (village line) ====
- Casemate de Ried (28/3)
- Casemate d'Espereinwald Nord (29/3)
- Casemate d'Espereinwald Sud (30/3)
- Casemate de Nachwidt (30bis/3)
- Casemate de Saasenheim (31/3)
- Casemate de Richtolsheim (32/3)
- Casemate de Marckolsheim Nord (34/3)
- Casemate de Marckolsheim Sud (35/3) 48°09′27.88″N 7°33′21.21″E
- Casemate d'Artzenheim Nord (36/3)
- Casemate d'Artzenheim Sud (37/3)
- Casemate de Baltzenheim (38/3)

Peacetime barracks and support:

- Casernement de Sundhouse
- Casernement de Marckolsheim

=== Sub-sector of Dessenheim ===
28th Fortress Infantry Regiment (28e Régiment d'Infanterie de Forteresse (RIF)), Lt. Colonel Roman

==== First line (riverbank line) ====
- Casemate du Fort-Mortier (32/1)
- Casemate du Pont-de-Bateaux-de-Neuf-Brisach (31/1)
- Casemate du Pont-Rail-de-Neuf-Brisach (30b/1)
- Casemate du Pont-Rail-de-Neuf-Brisach Nord (30/11)
- Casemate du Pont-Rail-de-Neuf-Brisach Sud (29/1)
- Casemate d'Ochsenkopf Nord (27/1)
- Casemate d'Ochsenkopf Sud (24/1)
- Casemate de Geiswasser Nord (23/1)
- Casemate de Geiswasser Sud (22/1)
- Casemate de Nambsheim Rhin (21/1)
- Casemate de Steinhubel (17/1)
- Casemate de Grossegrun (16/1)

==== Second line (infantry shelter line) ====
- Abri du Cimitière-des-Juifs (21/2)
- Abri de la Sirène (23/2)
- Abri de Vogelgrün (24/2)
- Abri de Geiswasser-Village (25/2)
- Abri de Nambsheim-Digue (26/2)

==== Third line (village line) ====
- Casemate de Kunheim Nord (29/3)
- Casemate de Kunheim Sud (40/3)
- Casemate de Biesheim Nord (41/3)
- Casemate de Biesheim Sud (42/3)
- Casemate d'Algolsheim Nord (47/3)
- Casemate d'Algolsheim Sud (Est) (49/3)
- Casemate de Nambsheim Nord (47/3)
- Casemate de Balgau Sud (49/3)
- Casemate de Fessenheim Nord (50/3)
- Casemate de Fessenheim Sud (51/3)
- Casemate de la Chapelle-Ste-Colombe (52/3)
- Casemate de Blodelsheim Nord (53/3)
- Casemate de Blodelsheim Centre (54/3)
- Casemate de Blodelsheim Sud (55/3)

Peacetime barracks and support:

- Casernement de Fessenheim

== History ==
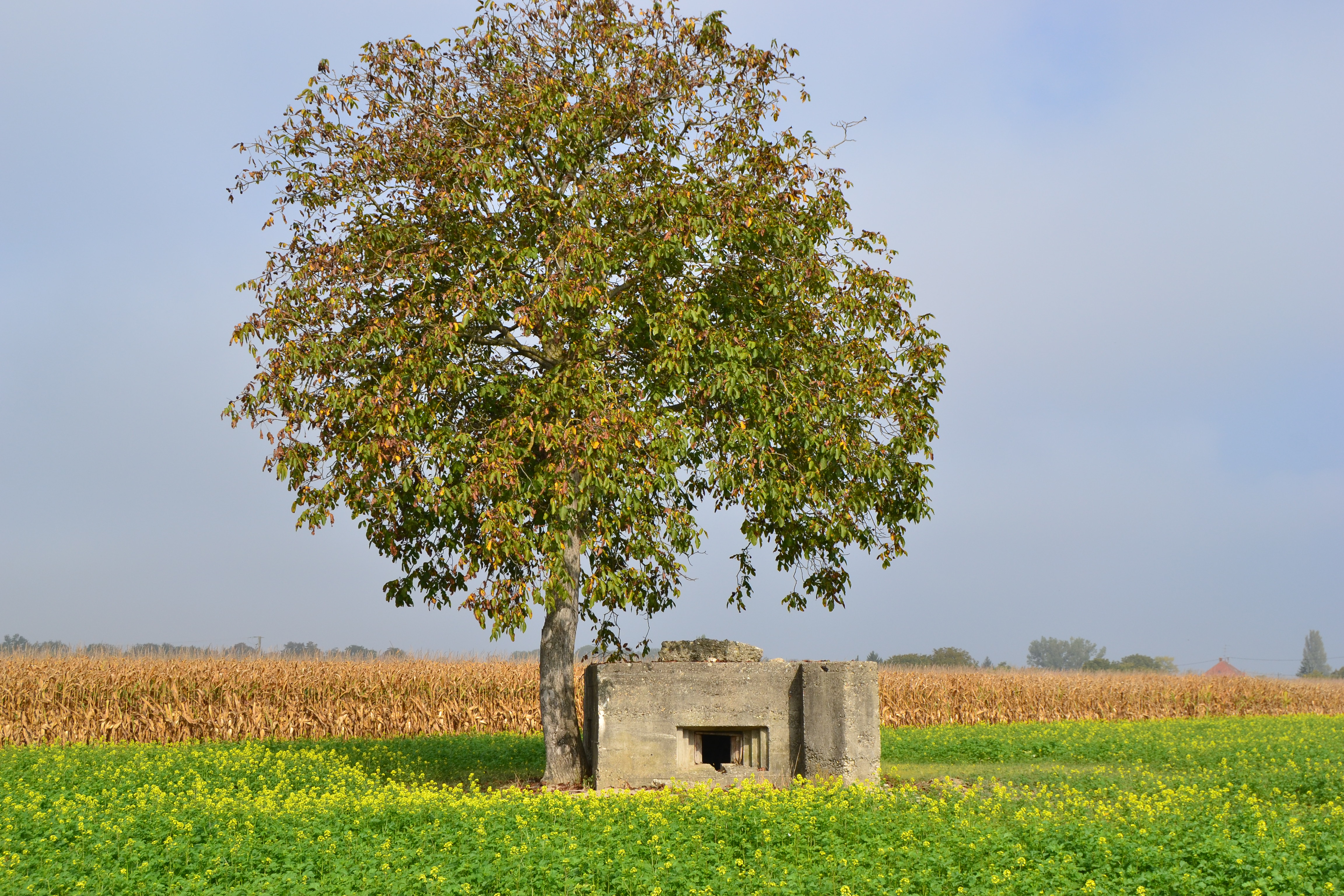
Geiswasser blockhouse

=== Battle of France ===
The French Rhine defenses did not see significant action until the middle of June 1940. By this time the main French army was in full retreat. The casemate lines along the Rhine were not supported by significant mobile forces or field artillery, which had been diverted to more urgent tasks. The casemates were designed to be mutually supporting, with fields of fire along the Rhine rather than across it. The first line was exposed to enemy fire from across the Rhine, a distance of a few hundred meters. German forces, under General Dollmann, amounted to seven divisions of the Seventh Army, supported by about three hundred artillery pieces.

The codename Kleiner Bär ("Little Bear" or "Lesser Bear") was given to the planned German cross-Rhine operation. The initial attack started at 0900 (some sources say 1000) on 15 June with artillery bombardments. 8.8 cm guns concentrated on the French positions just across the river, destroying many in a few minutes. At 0920 the first assault crossed the river, composed of the German 218th Infantry Division at Schoenau, the 221st Infantry Division at Limbourg and the 239th Infantry Division at Sponeck. Supporting operations were carried out by the 554th ID at Neuf-Brisach and the 557th ID at Rhinau in the Lower Rhine sector.

In most locations the French were unable to mount a serious defense, lacking artillery support and mobile forces. Riverbank positions were cleared quickly or destroyed by the Germans. The strongest resistance was posed by Casemate Schoenau Sud, which caused the 218th ID to suspend a portion of its crossing operations. Stronger resistance came from the third defensive line, supported by interval troops. Heavy fighting took place around Neuf-Brisach, where the German 554th ID's 623rd Infantry Regiment encountered Casemate Fort-Mortier and its supporting troops from the 28th RIF. The 623rd was pinned to the riverbank. The 557th ID's attack at Rhinau was intended to be a diversionary attack, but it produced significant success. The artillery bombardment and infantry attack destroyed most French positions, with only Casemate Rhinau Sud holding out through the day. Several positions in the third line were taken by the Germans on the 15th at Rhinau. In all, at the end of 15 June, German forces held a shallow bridgehead 30 kilometres (19 mi) wide, extending to the third line, about 4 kilometres (2.5 mi) back from the riverbank. The Germans used the night to land reinforcements.

16 June opened with another artillery bombardment, followed up by attacks on the third line of casemates, supported by unopposed Stuka attacks. By evening, third-line casemates in the central portion of the front were being captured or were surrendering. The most significant resistance was mounted by Casemates Marckolsheim Sud and Nord, but Sud was captured by evening and Nord the next morning. Apart from some casemate crews left to cover their retreat, the survivors of the 104th and 105th DIF abandoned the remaining fortifications overnight, retreating to new positions in the Vosges mountains. Colmar was occupied on the 17th, but some casemates held out until the 18th. The French Army Group 2, of which the 104th and 105th were a part, was encircled in the Vosges, remaining there until they surrendered at last on 25 June.

==== Units ====
The 28th Fortress Infantry Regiment was positioned in the Dessenheim sub-sector. German fire on the 15th of June forced many riverside casemate garrisons out of their positions, followed up by aerial bombardment the next day. On the 18th the regiment retreated, the first battalion to Hohneck and the second to the Markstein and the Petit-Ballon in the Vosges. By the 21st, the first battalion was pushed back to the Reinkopf, the La Bresse, finally surrendering at Wildensein. The second battalion was surrounded at Markstein, where most of the unit was captured.

The 42nd Fortress Infantry Regiment held the Elsenheim sub-sector. On 17 June the regiment retreated to Kaysersberg in the Vosges, fighting an action against the Germans at the Col du Surceneux. The regiment was captured on 22 June.

=== 1944 ===
As Allied forces approached the Rhine in November 1944, the Germans destroyed many of the bankside fortifications that had escaped damage in 1940.

== Present situation ==
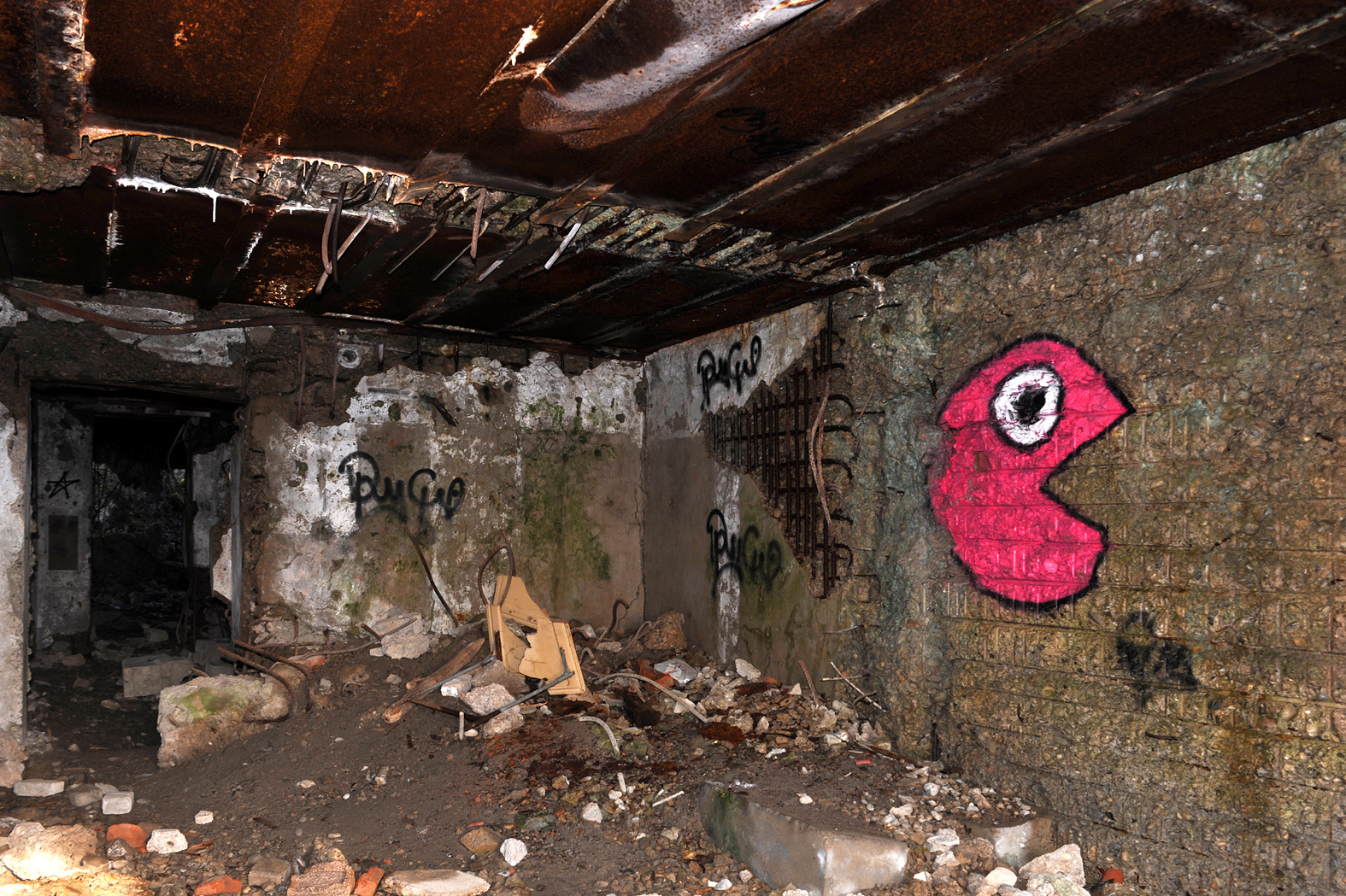
Interior of Saasenheim casemate in 2011

Most of the Rhine defenses were simply abandoned after World War II. Most of the first line of blockhouses on the banks of the river were destroyed when the river was widened as part of navigational improvements in the 1970s. Many village line positions remain, but have been stripped by salvagers.

Marckolsheim Sud (35/3) casemate was preserved in 1972 and is operated as the Memorial Museum of the Maginot Line of the Rhine (Musée Mémorial de la Ligne Maginot du Rhin). The STG blockhouses at Aschenbach and des Vernes are preserved as well.

== See also ==
- Colmar Pocket, formed by retreating German forces in 1944

== Bibliography ==
- Allcorn, William. The Maginot Line 1928-45. Oxford: Osprey Publishing, 2003. ISBN 1-84176-646-1
- Kaufmann, J.E. and Kaufmann, H.W. Fortress France: The Maginot Line and French Defenses in World War II, Stackpole Books, 2006. ISBN 0-275-98345-5
- Kaufmann, J.E., Kaufmann, H.W., Jancovič-Potočnik, A. and Lang, P. The Maginot Line: History and Guide, Pen and Sword, 2011. ISBN 978-1-84884-068-3
- Mary, Jean-Yves; Hohnadel, Alain; Sicard, Jacques. Hommes et Ouvrages de la Ligne Maginot, Tome 1. Paris, Histoire & Collections, 2001. ISBN 2-908182-88-2 (in French)
- Mary, Jean-Yves; Hohnadel, Alain; Sicard, Jacques. Hommes et Ouvrages de la Ligne Maginot, Tome 3. Paris, Histoire & Collections, 2003. ISBN 2-913903-88-6 (in French)
- Mary, Jean-Yves; Hohnadel, Alain; Sicard, Jacques. Hommes et Ouvrages de la Ligne Maginot, Tome 5. Paris, Histoire & Collections, 2009. ISBN 978-2-35250-127-5 (in French)
- Romanych, Marc; Rupp, Martin. Maginot Line 1940: Battles on the French Frontier. Oxford: Osprey Publishing, 2010. ISBN 1-84176-646-1
