= Thorigny-sur-le-Mignon =

- Part of Val-du-Mignon
- Location of Thorigny-sur-le-Mignon
- Location within France Location within Nouvelle-Aquitaine
- Coordinates: 46°09′12″N 0°33′07″W
- Country: France
- Region: Nouvelle-Aquitaine
- Department: Deux-Sèvres
- Arrondissement: Niort
- Canton: Mignon-et-Boutonne
- Commune: Val-du-Mignon
- Area^{1}: 5.26 km^{2} (2.03 sq mi)
- Elevation: 31 m (102 ft)
- Highest elevation: 43 m (141 ft)
- Lowest elevation: 26 m (85 ft)
- Population (2022): 101
  - Density: 19.2/km^{2} (49.7/sq mi)
- Time zone: UTC+01:00 (CET)
  - Summer (DST): UTC+02:00 (CEST)
- Postal code: 79360
- ^{1} French Land Register data, which excludes lakes, ponds, glaciers > 1 km^{2} (0.386 sq mi or 247 acres) and river estuaries.

Thorigny-sur-le-Mignon (French pronunciation: [tɔʁiɲi syʁ lə miɲɔ̃], before 2001: Thorigny) is a former commune in the Deux-Sèvres department in western France. On 1 January 2019, it was merged into the new commune Val-du-Mignon.

== See also ==
- Communes of the Deux-Sèvres department
