= Priaires =

- Part of Val-du-Mignon
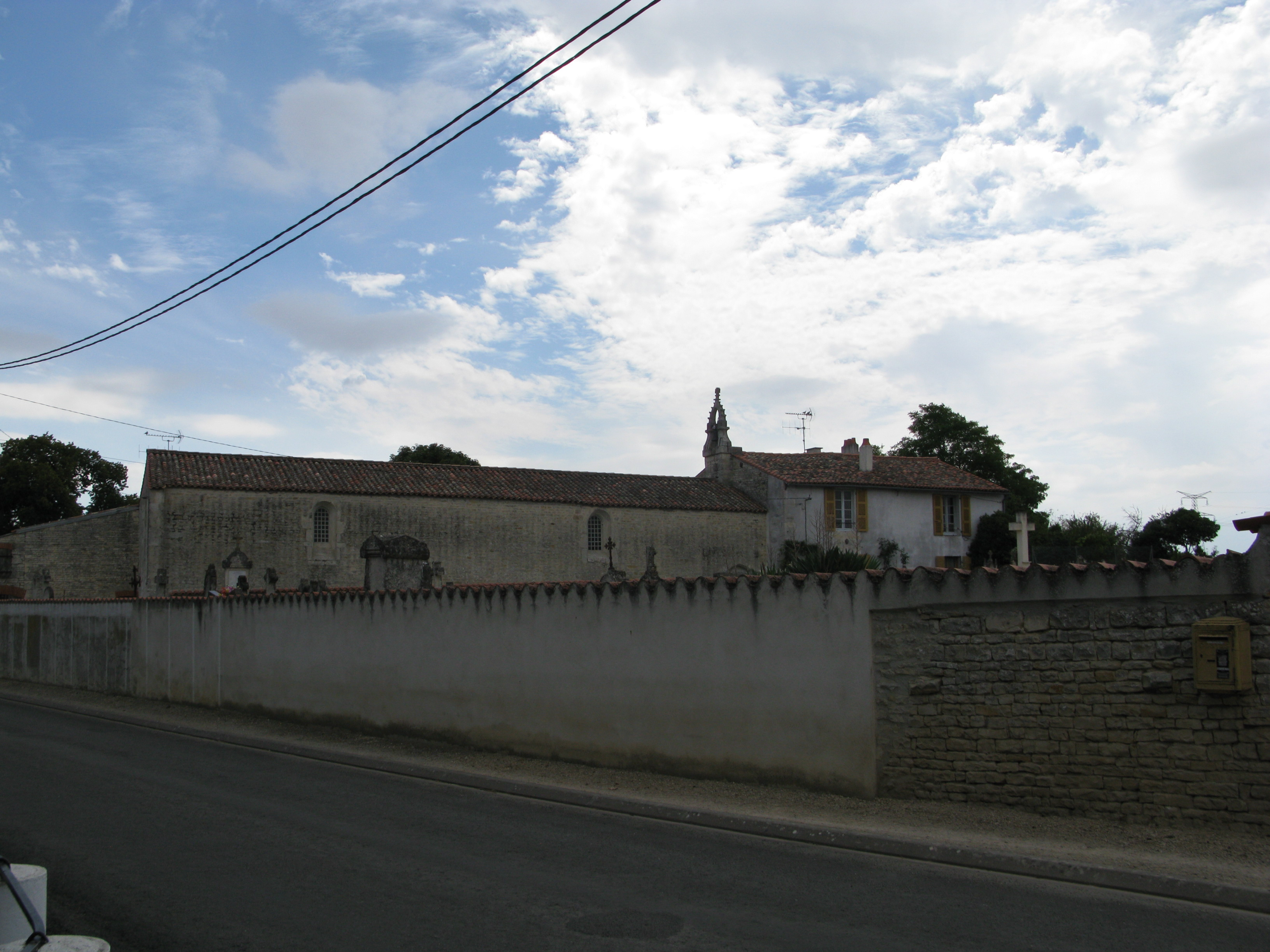
- The cemetery in Priaires
- Location of Priaires
- Location within France Location within Nouvelle-Aquitaine
- Coordinates: 46°08′34″N 0°36′20″W
- Country: France
- Region: Nouvelle-Aquitaine
- Department: Deux-Sèvres
- Arrondissement: Niort
- Canton: Mignon-et-Boutonne
- Commune: Val-du-Mignon
- Area^{1}: 6.84 km^{2} (2.64 sq mi)
- Elevation: 30 m (98 ft)
- Highest elevation: 52 m (171 ft)
- Lowest elevation: 19 m (62 ft)
- Population (2022): 127
  - Density: 18.6/km^{2} (48.1/sq mi)
- Time zone: UTC+01:00 (CET)
  - Summer (DST): UTC+02:00 (CEST)
- Postal code: 79210
- ^{1} French Land Register data, which excludes lakes, ponds, glaciers > 1 km^{2} (0.386 sq mi or 247 acres) and river estuaries.

Priaires (French pronunciation: [pʁijɛʁ]) is a former commune in the Deux-Sèvres department in western France. On 1 January 2019, it was merged into the new commune Val-du-Mignon.

== See also ==
- Communes of the Deux-Sèvres department
