= Ensigné =

- Commune
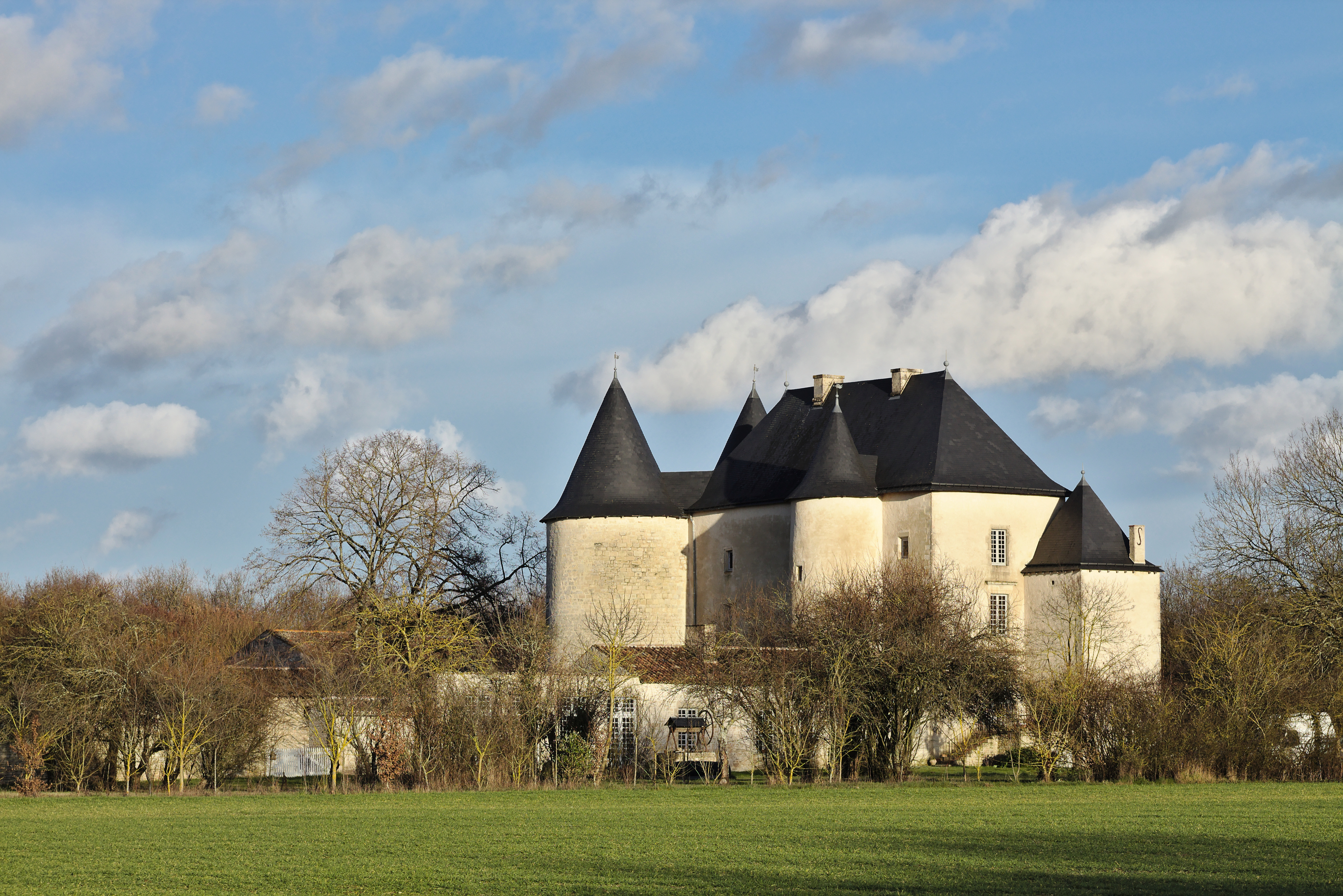
- The commandry
- Location of Ensigné
- Location within France Location within Nouvelle-Aquitaine
- Coordinates: 46°05′19″N 0°14′35″W
- Country: France
- Region: Nouvelle-Aquitaine
- Department: Deux-Sèvres
- Arrondissement: Niort
- Canton: Mignon-et-Boutonne

Government
  - Mayor (2020–2026): Bernard Belaud
- Area^{1}: 20.30 km^{2} (7.84 sq mi)
- Elevation: 413 m (1,355 ft)
- Highest elevation: 149 m (489 ft)
- Lowest elevation: 55 m (180 ft)
- Population (2023): 288
  - Density: 14.2/km^{2} (36.7/sq mi)
- Time zone: UTC+01:00 (CET)
  - Summer (DST): UTC+02:00 (CEST)
- INSEE/Postal code: 79111 /79170
- ^{1} French Land Register data, which excludes lakes, ponds, glaciers > 1 km^{2} (0.386 sq mi or 247 acres) and river estuaries.

Ensigné (French pronunciation: [ɑ̃siɲe]) is a commune in the Deux-Sèvres department in the Nouvelle-Aquitaine region in western France.

== Geography ==
The surrounding countryside is densely wooded. The village is close to the forest of Ensigné and of Aulnay.

The kindergarten and primary school have been merged with those of Asnières-en-Poitou and Paizay-le-Chapt, none of the three individual villages having a population above 300 by the start of the twenty-first century.

== History ==
The history of the village is closely linked to that of the Knights Templar. Ensigné contains a Templar command post comprising fortifications, a chapel and a castle.

Today the site is privately owned: the castle itself is in a ruined condition, but two separate properties have been created from the part including the former chapel.

== See also ==
- Communes of the Deux-Sèvres department
