= Bourdet =

Bourdet is a French surname. It may refer to:

- Claude Bourdet (1909-1996), writer and politician
- Edouard Bourdet (1887-1945), playwright.

It may also refer to:

- Le Bourdet, a commune in the Deux-Sèvres department.
