= Le Vert =

Le Vert may refer to:

- Octavia Walton Le Vert, a popular antebellum socialite and author, also known as Madame Le Vert.
- LeVert, an R&B group from Ohio, USA
- Le Vert, Deux-Sèvres, a commune in western France
