= Juillé =

Juillé may refer to the following places in France:

- Juillé, Charente, a commune in the Charente department
- Juillé, Sarthe, a commune in the Sarthe department
- Juillé, Deux-Sèvres, a commune in the Deux-Sèvres department
