= Usseau =

Usseau may refer to the following places in France:

- Usseau, Deux-Sèvres, a commune in the Deux-Sèvres department
- Usseau, Vienne, a commune in the Vienne department
