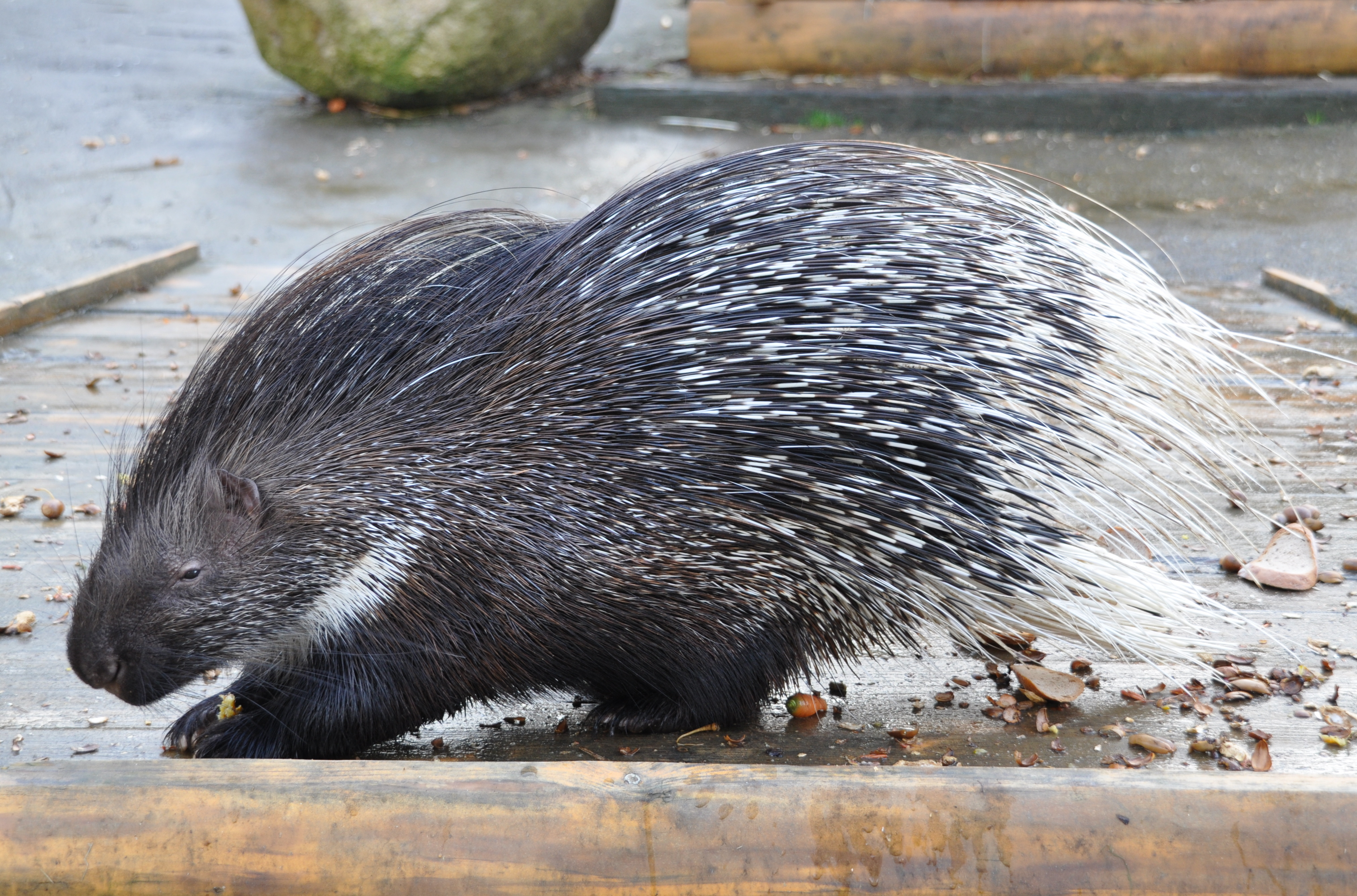
- Lüneburg Heath Wildlife Park, Lower Saxony, Germany

Conservation status
- Least Concern (IUCN 3.1)

Scientific classification
- Kingdom: Animalia
- Phylum: Chordata
- Class: Mammalia
- Order: Rodentia
- Family: Hystricidae
- Genus: Hystrix
- Species: H. cristata

Binomial name
- Hystrix cristata Linnaeus, 1758
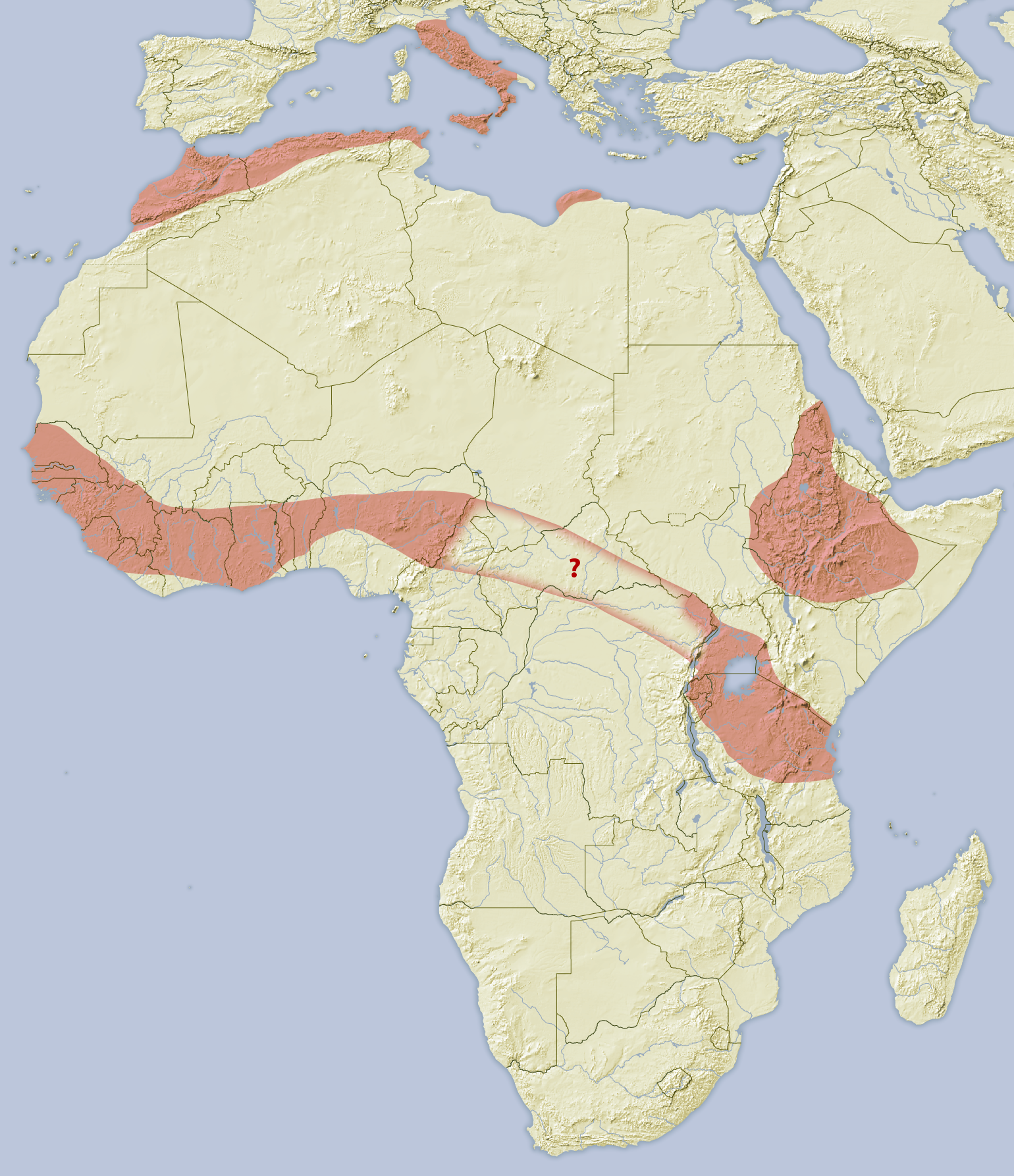
- range

= Crested porcupine =

Species of rodent

The crested porcupine (Hystrix cristata), also known as the African crested porcupine, is a species of rodent in the family Hystricidae native to Italy, North Africa, West Africa, Central Africa and East Africa. Alongside the Cape porcupine, it is one of the largest porcupine species in the world. It is the only species of porcupine found in Europe.

== Characteristics ==
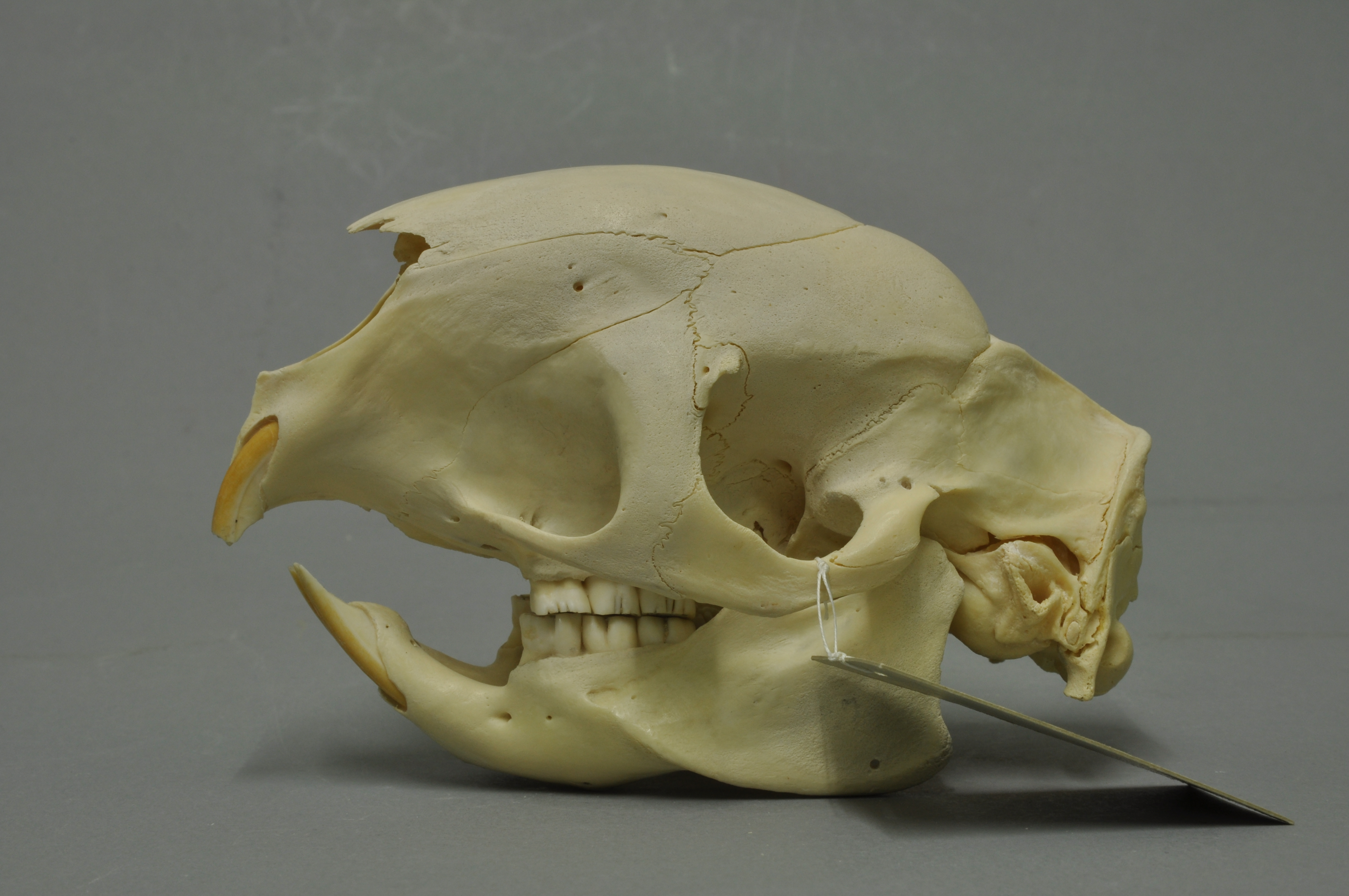
Skull of a crested porcupine

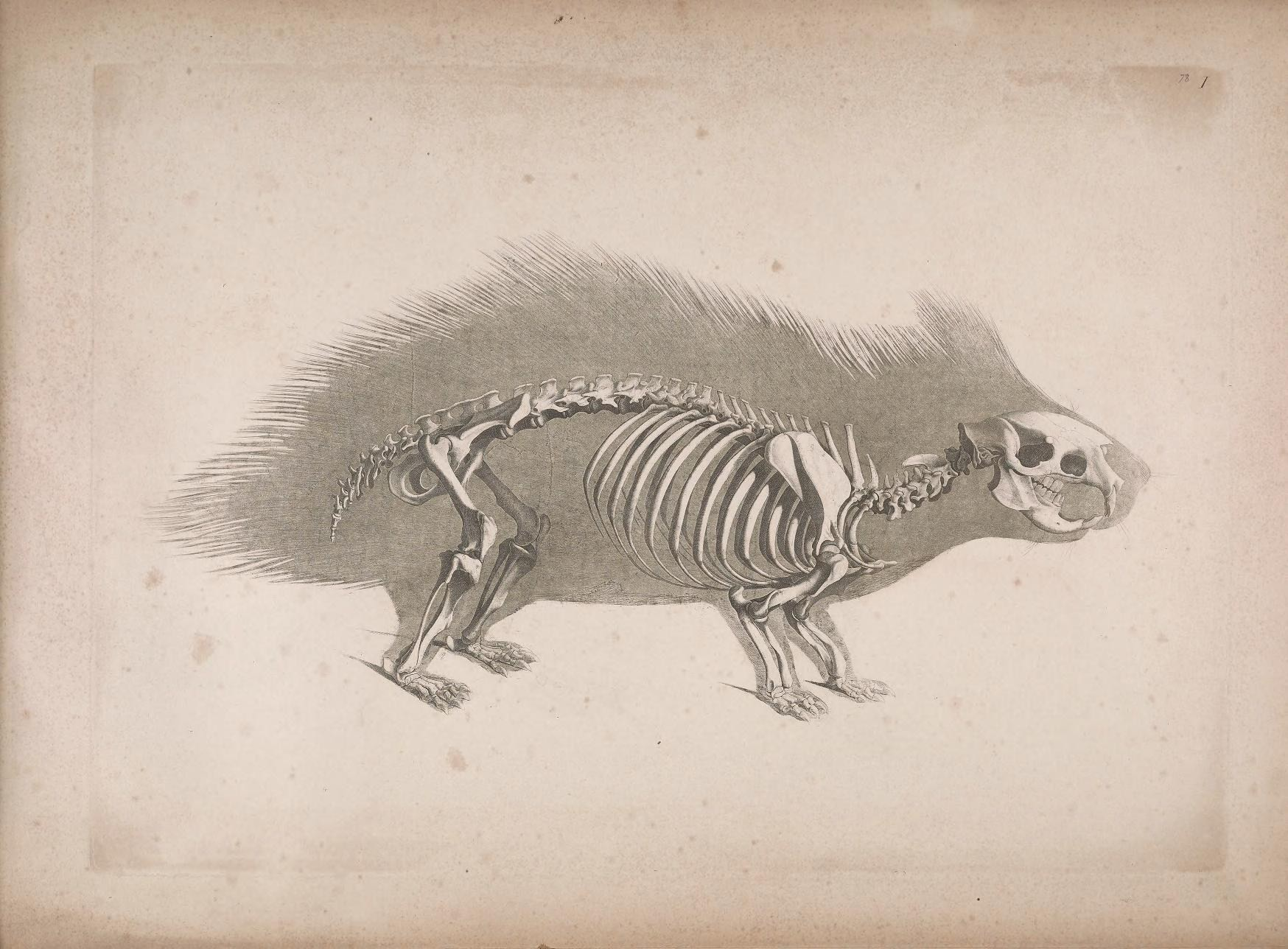
Skeleton of a crested porcupine

The adult crested porcupine has an average head and body length around 60 to 83 cm (24 to 33 in) long, discounting the tail, and weighs from 13 to 27 kg (29 to 60 lb). It is one of the largest rodents in the world.

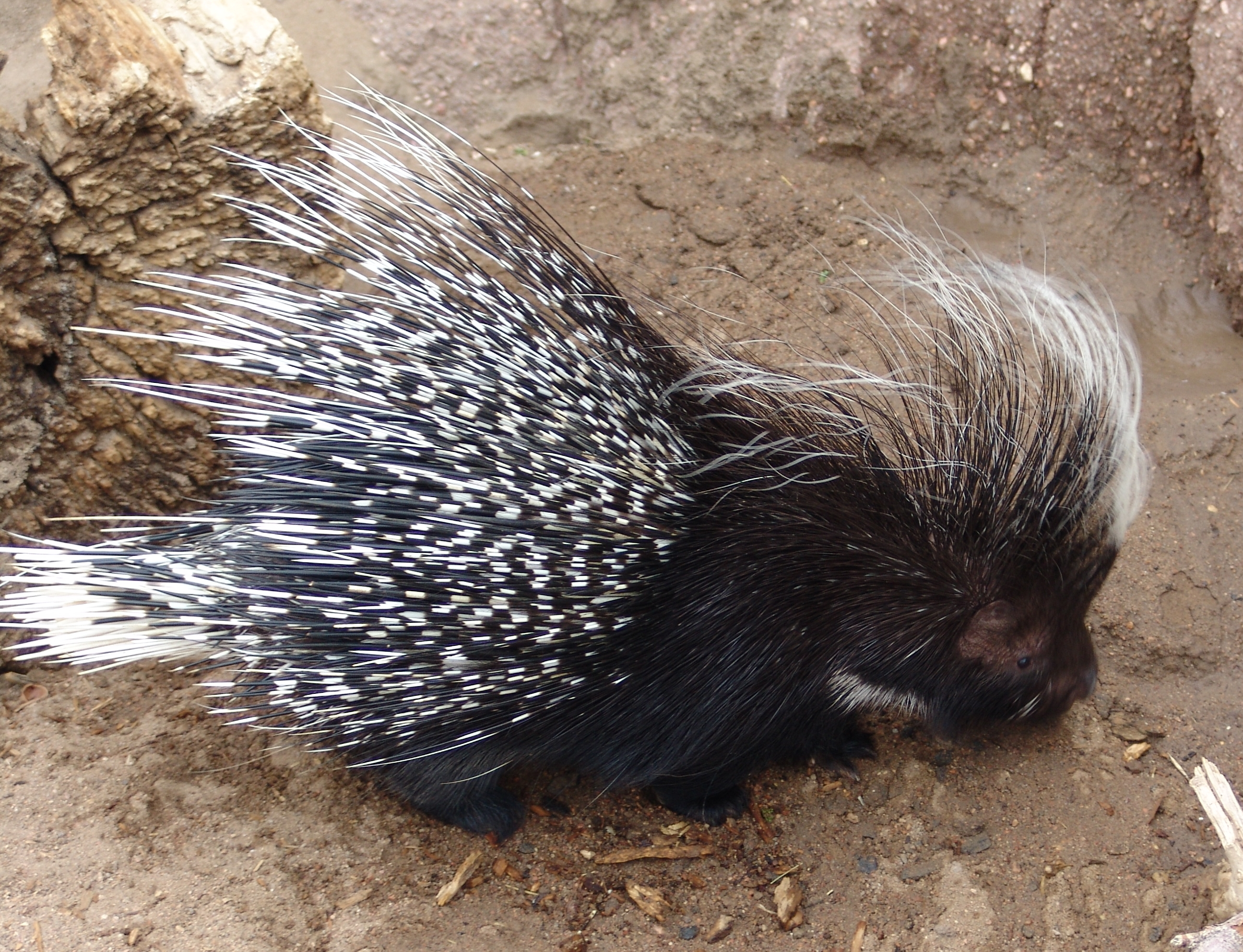
A captive crested porcupine

Almost the entire body is covered with bristles which are either dark brown or black and rather coarse. This mammal is recognizable by the quills that run along the head, nape, and back that can be raised into a crest, hence the name crested porcupine. Also, some sturdier quills which are about 35 cm (14 in) in length run along the sides and back half of the body. These sturdier quills are used, for the most part, for defense and are usually marked with light and dark bands which alternate; these are not firmly attached. This porcupine has a short tail which has rattle quills at the end. The rattle quills broaden at the terminal end and the broad portion is hollow with thin walls. When these quills are vibrated, they produce a hiss-like rattle, just like a rattlesnake. The front feet of the crested porcupine have four developed and clawed digits with a regressed thumb, the rear feet have five. The paws have naked and padded soles and have a plantigrade gait. The ears are external and both the eyes and ears are very small with long vibrissae on its head. The skull is distinctive in many ways: first, the infraorbital foramen is greatly enlarged so portions of the masseter extend through it and attach from the frontal side surface of the snout; second, the angular process is inflected on the lower jaw, and third, the nasal cavity is enlarged. Prominent pockets create enlarged areas of attachment for chewing muscles. Collar bones are very much reduced, and one incisor, one premolar and three molars are present in each quadrant. The male's penis is directed caudally (towards the rear end) when not erect.

== Distribution and habitat ==
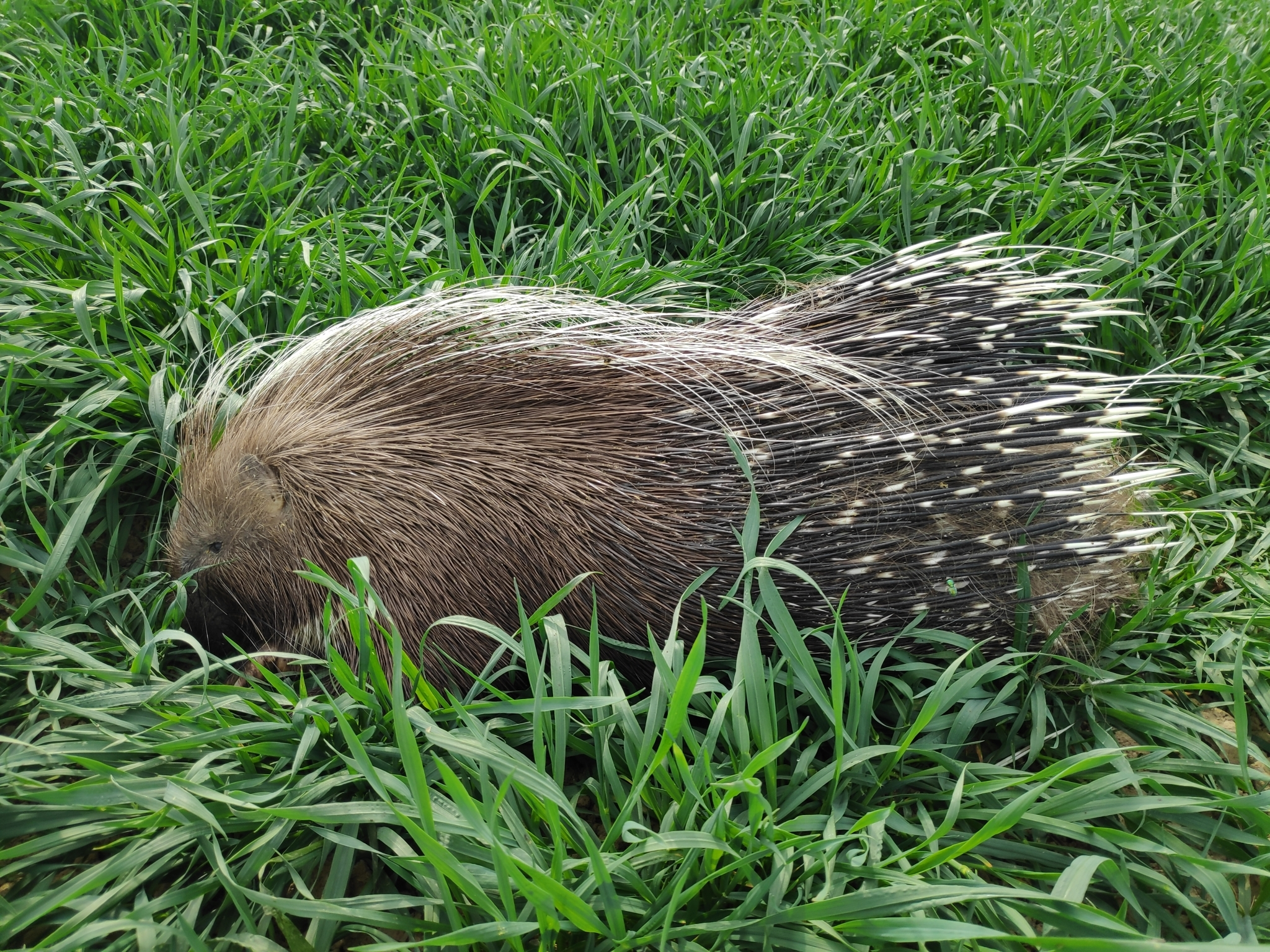
A crested porcupine in Italy

The crested porcupine is found in Italy, North Africa, and sub-Saharan Africa. In the Mediterranean, it is known from mainland Italy and the island of Sicily, Morocco, Algeria, and Tunisia; they are also recorded in Ghana, Libya and along the Egyptian coast. It has been recorded from sea level to 2,550 m (8,370 ft) in Moroccan Anti-Atlas.

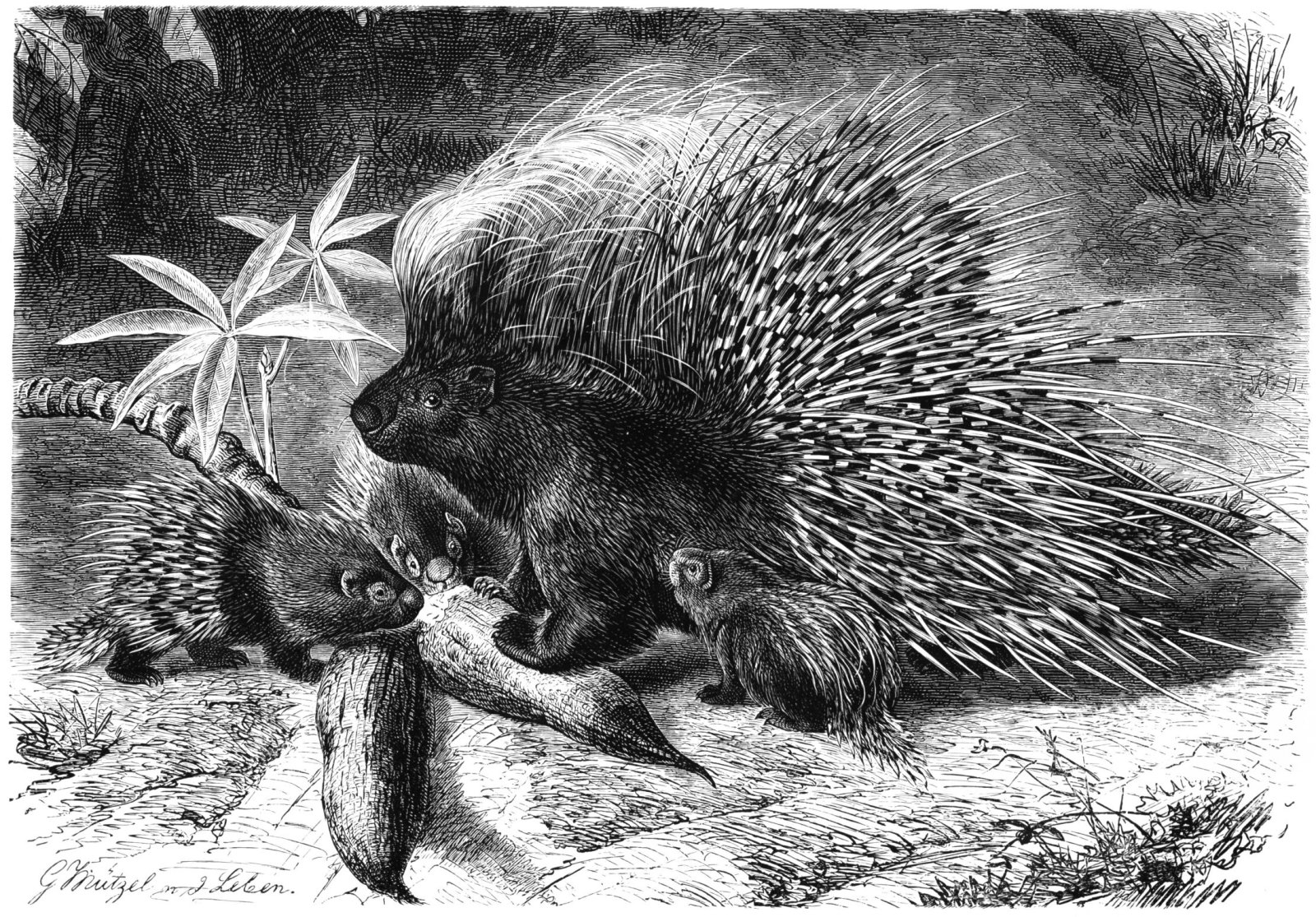
North African crested porcupine (H. cristata) drawn by Gustav Mützel

The crested porcupine is native to Algeria, Benin, Burkina Faso, Burundi, Cameroon, Central African Republic, Chad, Côte d'Ivoire, Democratic Republic of the Congo, Eritrea, Ethiopia, Gambia, Ghana, Djibouti, Guinea, Guinea-Bissau, Italy, Kenya, Liberia, Libya, Mali, Morocco, Nigeria, Rwanda, Senegal, Sierra Leone, Somalia, Sudan, South Sudan, Tanzania, Togo, Tunisia and Uganda. It is locally extinct in Egypt.

== Behaviour and ecology ==
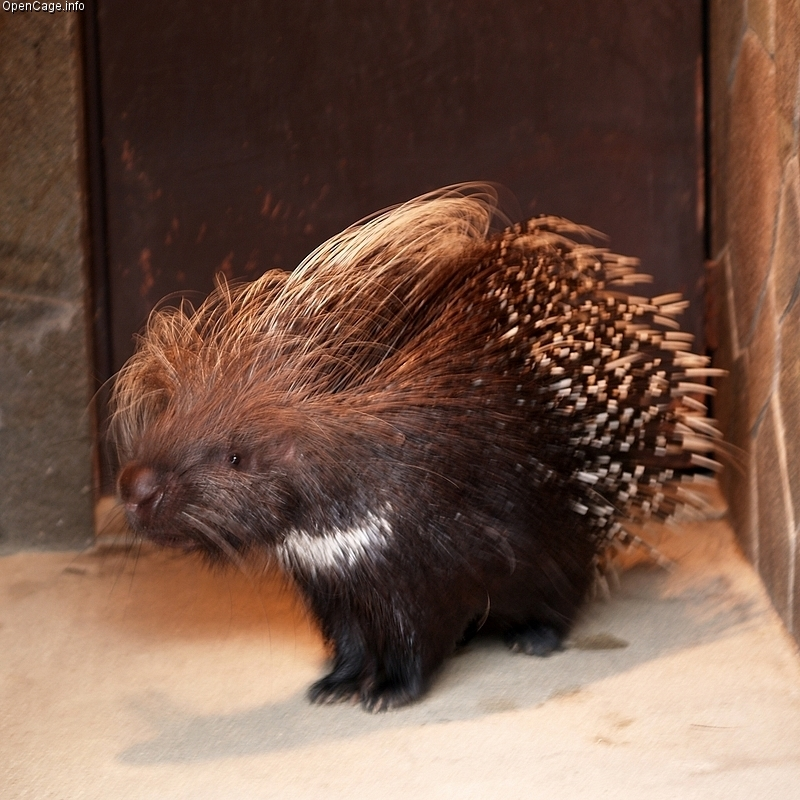
At Kobe Oji Zoo

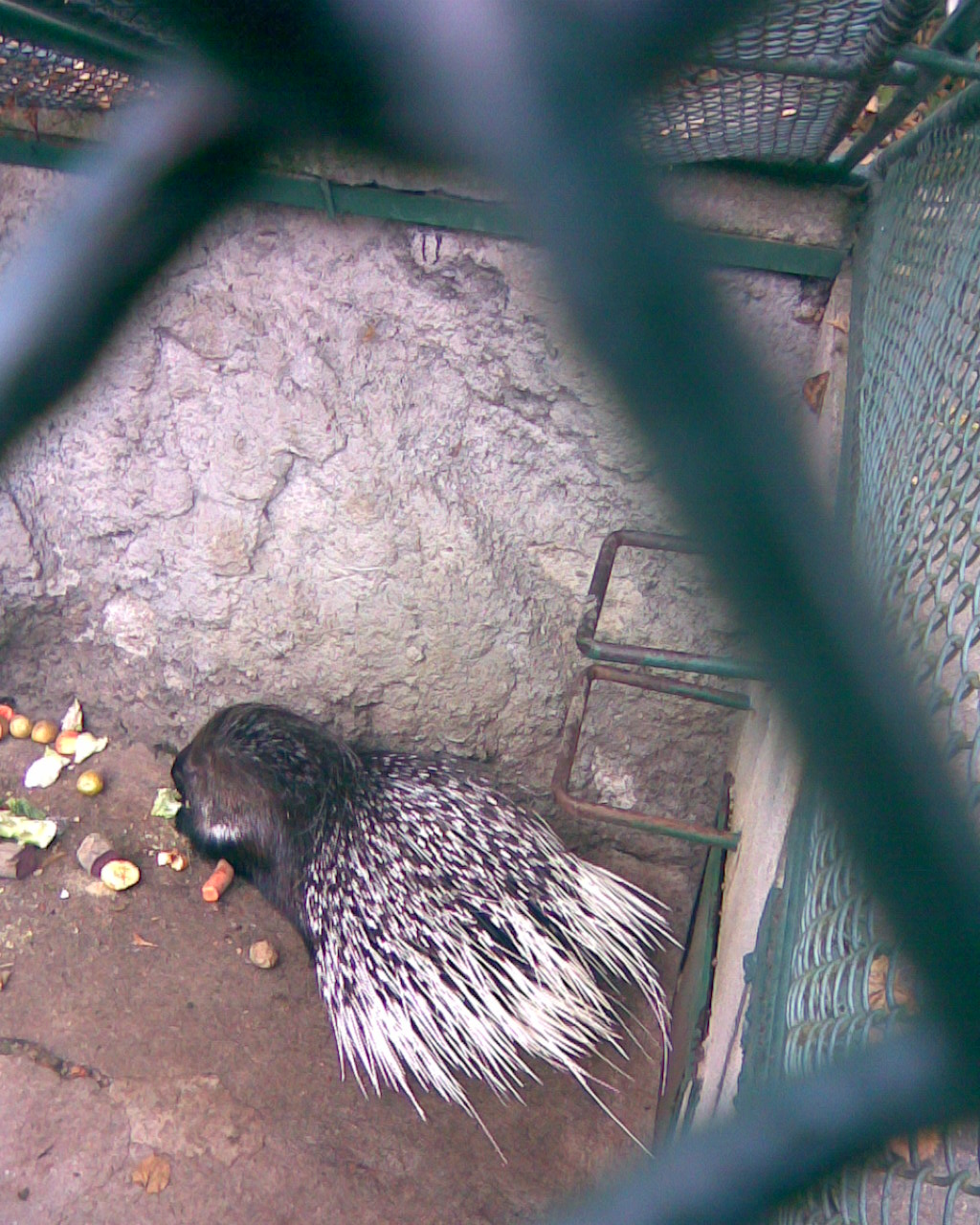
Crested porcupine in captivity

The crested porcupine is a terrestrial mammal; it very seldom climbs trees, but can swim. It is nocturnal and monogamous. The crested porcupine takes care of the young for an extended period, and small family groups consist of the adult pair and young of various ages. In defense, when disturbed, they raise and fan their quills to make themselves look bigger. If continually bothered, the crested porcupine will stamp its feet, whirr the quills, and charge the disturber back end first trying to stab the enemy with the thicker, shorter quills. These attacks are known to have killed lions, leopards, hyenas, and even humans.

Crested porcupines have been known to collect thousands of bones that they find at night. They are mostly nocturnal, and they may come upon the skeletons of animals. They collect these bones and store them in an underground chamber or cave.

=== Diet and digestion ===
The crested porcupine is for the most part herbivorous, eating roots, bulbs, and leaves, but occasionally they do consume insects, small vertebrates, and carrion. To ingest calcium and sharpen incisors, they often gnaw on bones. These animals often travel long distances looking for food. They have high crowned teeth that grind plant tissues which are digested in the stomach, and the undigested fibers are retained in an enlarged appendix and anterior large intestine, where they are broken down by microorganisms.

=== Reproduction ===
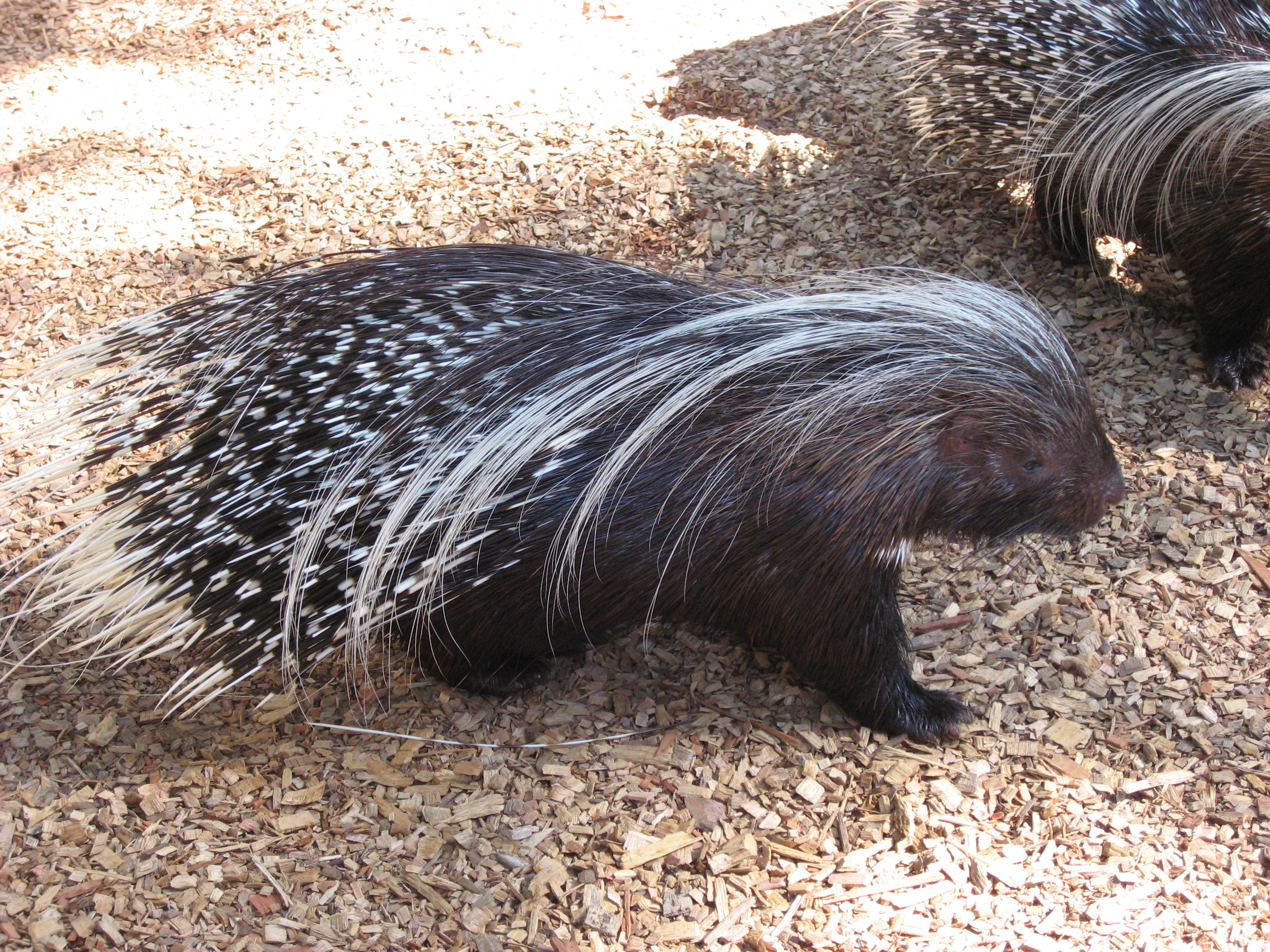
Zoodyssée, Villiers-en-Bois, France

Most of what is known about reproduction in the crested porcupine comes from individuals in captivity. Usually, female crested porcupines have one litter every year. One or two well developed young are born in a chamber within the burrow that is usually lined with grass, after on average a 66-day gestation period. The young weigh about 1,000 g (35 oz) at birth, which is about 5% of the mother's weight. They leave the den after one week. At this time, the spines begin to harden. Crested porcupines reach adult weight at one to two years and are often sexually mature just before then. Breeding occurs throughout the year.

Crested porcupines live up to 28 years, the second-longest of any rodent after the naked mole-rat, which can live in excess of 37 years.
