= Usseau, Deux-Sèvres =

Usseau
- Part of Val-du-Mignon
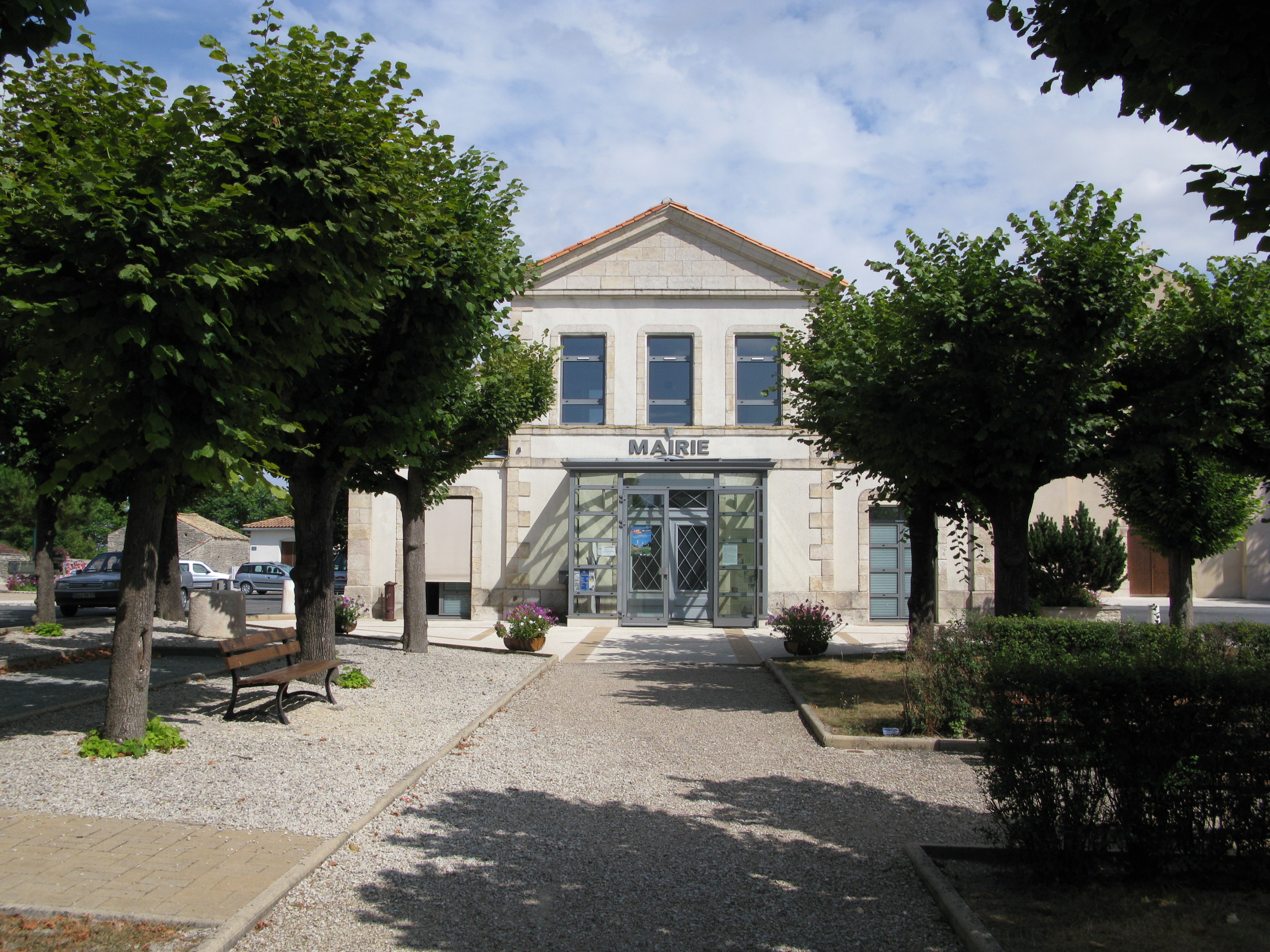
- The town hall in Usseau
- Location of Usseau
- Location within France Location within Nouvelle-Aquitaine
- Coordinates: 46°10′29″N 0°34′44″W
- Country: France
- Region: Nouvelle-Aquitaine
- Department: Deux-Sèvres
- Arrondissement: Niort
- Canton: Mignon-et-Boutonne
- Commune: Val-du-Mignon
- Area^{1}: 16.10 km^{2} (6.22 sq mi)
- Elevation: 30 m (98 ft)
- Highest elevation: 49 m (161 ft)
- Lowest elevation: 18 m (59 ft)
- Population (2022): 859
  - Density: 53.4/km^{2} (138/sq mi)
- Time zone: UTC+01:00 (CET)
  - Summer (DST): UTC+02:00 (CEST)
- Postal code: 79210
- ^{1} French Land Register data, which excludes lakes, ponds, glaciers > 1 km^{2} (0.386 sq mi or 247 acres) and river estuaries.

Usseau is a former commune in the Deux-Sèvres department in western France. On 1 January 2019, it was merged into the new commune Val-du-Mignon.

== See also ==
- Communes of the Deux-Sèvres department
