= La Foye-Monjault =

- Commune
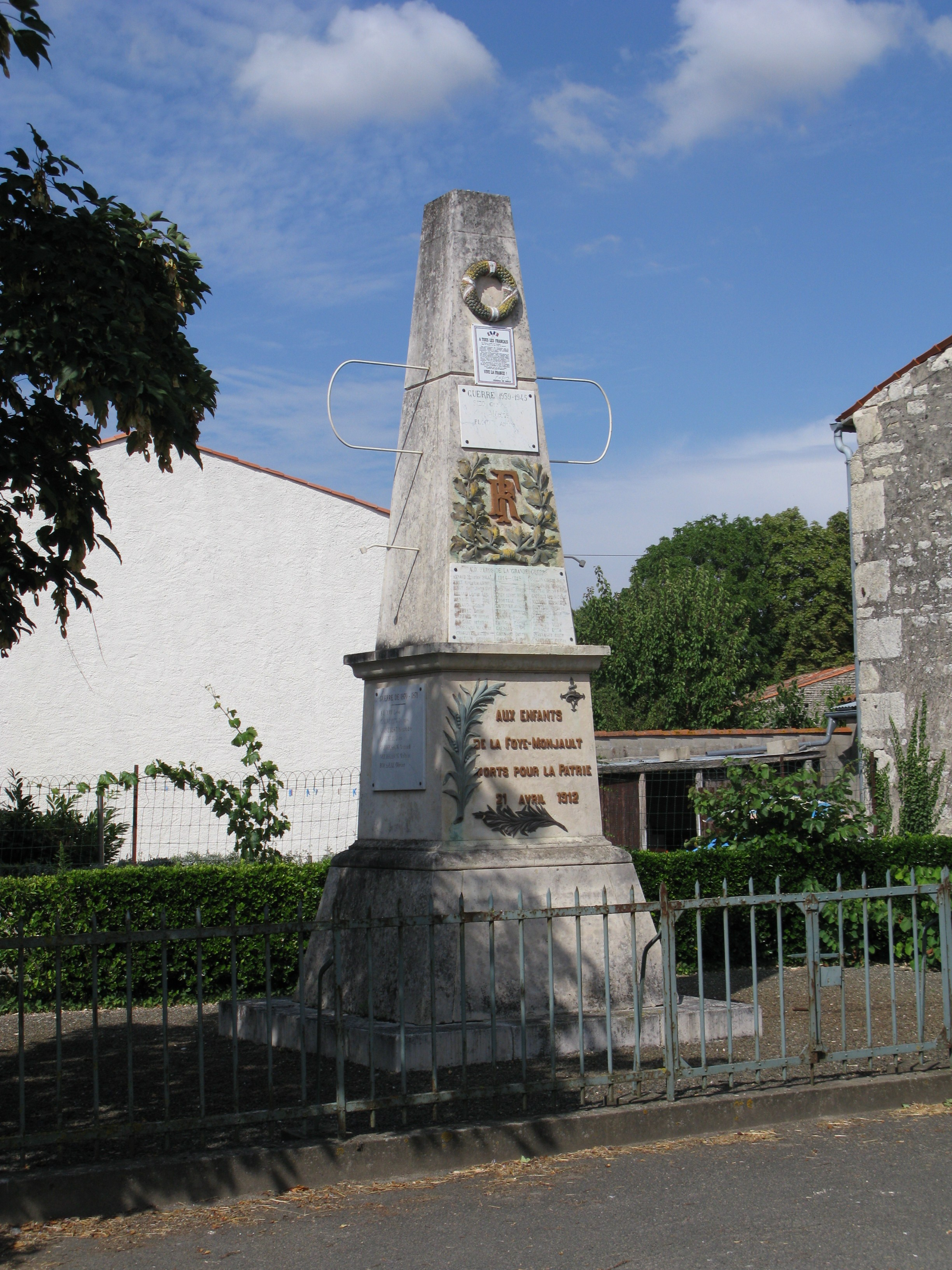
- The war memorial in Le Foye-Monjault
- Location of La Foye-Monjault
- Location within France Location within Nouvelle-Aquitaine
- Coordinates: 46°11′14″N 0°32′12″W
- Country: France
- Region: Nouvelle-Aquitaine
- Department: Deux-Sèvres
- Arrondissement: Niort
- Canton: Mignon-et-Boutonne
- Intercommunality: CA Niortais

Government
  - Mayor (2020–2026): Dany Michaud
- Area^{1}: 19.06 km^{2} (7.36 sq mi)
- Elevation: 59 m (194 ft)
- Highest elevation: 74 m (243 ft)
- Lowest elevation: 33 m (108 ft)
- Population (2023): 839
  - Density: 44.0/km^{2} (114/sq mi)
- Time zone: UTC+01:00 (CET)
  - Summer (DST): UTC+02:00 (CEST)
- INSEE/Postal code: 79127 /79360
- ^{1} French Land Register data, which excludes lakes, ponds, glaciers > 1 km^{2} (0.386 sq mi or 247 acres) and river estuaries.

La Foye-Monjault (French pronunciation: [la fwa mɔ̃ʒo]) is a commune in the Deux-Sèvres department in the Nouvelle-Aquitaine region in western France.

== See also ==
- Communes of the Deux-Sèvres department
