= Le Vert, Deux-Sèvres =

Le Vert
- Commune
- Location of Le Vert
- Location within France Location within Nouvelle-Aquitaine
- Coordinates: 46°05′38″N 0°23′39″W
- Country: France
- Region: Nouvelle-Aquitaine
- Department: Deux-Sèvres
- Arrondissement: Niort
- Canton: Mignon-et-Boutonne

Government
  - Mayor (2020–2026): Sylviane Poinas
- Area^{1}: 11.81 km^{2} (4.56 sq mi)
- Elevation: 50 m (160 ft)
- Highest elevation: 97 m (318 ft)
- Lowest elevation: 35 m (115 ft)
- Population (2023): 117
  - Density: 9.91/km^{2} (25.7/sq mi)
- Time zone: UTC+01:00 (CET)
  - Summer (DST): UTC+02:00 (CEST)
- INSEE/Postal code: 79346 /79170
- ^{1} French Land Register data, which excludes lakes, ponds, glaciers > 1 km^{2} (0.386 sq mi or 247 acres) and river estuaries.

Le Vert (French pronunciation: [lə vɛʁ]) is a commune in the Deux-Sèvres department in western France. It is around 25 km south of Niort.

There are no shops in the village. The nearest pâtisserie is in Chizé.

== Geography ==
The commune is traversed by the river Boutonne. To the south of the village is the border between Deux-Sèvres and Charente-Maritime.

== See also ==
- Communes of the Deux-Sèvres department
