= Vernoux-sur-Boutonne =

- Commune
- Location of Vernoux-sur-Boutonne
- Location within France Location within Nouvelle-Aquitaine
- Coordinates: 46°09′42″N 0°14′38″W
- Country: France
- Region: Nouvelle-Aquitaine
- Department: Deux-Sèvres
- Arrondissement: Niort
- Canton: Mignon-et-Boutonne

Government
  - Mayor (2020–2026): Daniel Longeau
- Area^{1}: 8.12 km^{2} (3.14 sq mi)
- Elevation: 51 m (167 ft)
- Highest elevation: 70 m (230 ft)
- Lowest elevation: 43 m (141 ft)
- Population (2023): 249
  - Density: 30.7/km^{2} (79.4/sq mi)
- Time zone: UTC+01:00 (CET)
  - Summer (DST): UTC+02:00 (CEST)
- INSEE/Postal code: 79343 /79170
- ^{1} French Land Register data, which excludes lakes, ponds, glaciers > 1 km^{2} (0.386 sq mi or 247 acres) and river estuaries.

Vernoux-sur-Boutonne (French pronunciation: [vɛʁnu syʁ butɔn], literally Vernoux on Boutonne) is a commune in the Deux-Sèvres department in western France.

== Geography ==
The commune is traversed by the river Boutonne.

== See also ==
- Communes of the Deux-Sèvres department
