= La Rochénard =

- Commune
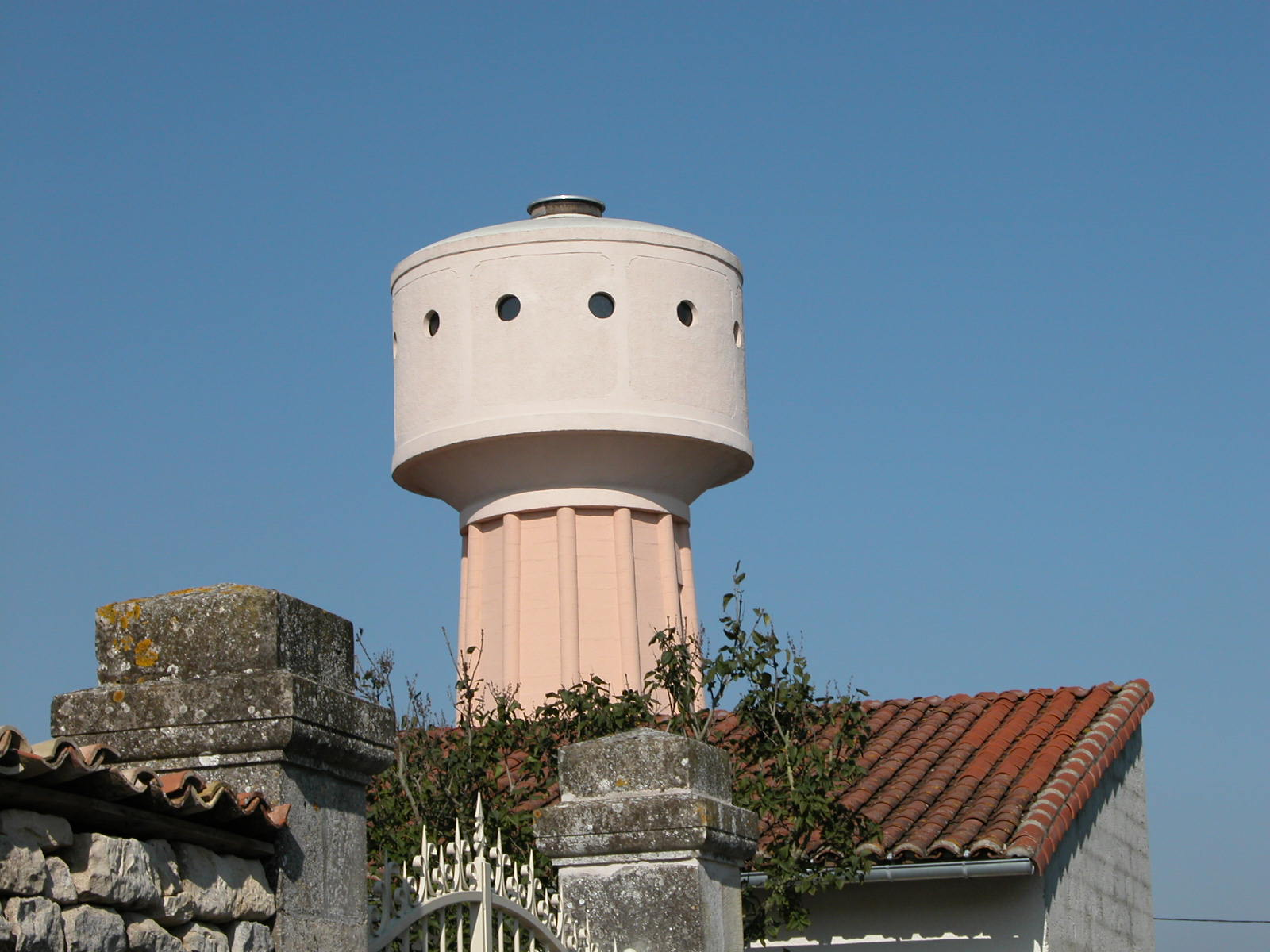
- The water tower in La Rochénard
- Location of La Rochénard
- Location within France Location within Nouvelle-Aquitaine
- Coordinates: 46°12′23″N 0°35′06″W
- Country: France
- Region: Nouvelle-Aquitaine
- Department: Deux-Sèvres
- Arrondissement: Niort
- Canton: Mignon-et-Boutonne
- Intercommunality: CA Niortais

Government
  - Mayor (2020–2026): Annick Bamberger
- Area^{1}: 8.55 km^{2} (3.30 sq mi)
- Elevation: 30 m (98 ft)
- Highest elevation: 72 m (236 ft)
- Lowest elevation: 27 m (89 ft)
- Population (2023): 518
  - Density: 60.6/km^{2} (157/sq mi)
- Time zone: UTC+01:00 (CET)
  - Summer (DST): UTC+02:00 (CEST)
- INSEE/Postal code: 79229 /79270
- ^{1} French Land Register data, which excludes lakes, ponds, glaciers > 1 km^{2} (0.386 sq mi or 247 acres) and river estuaries.

La Rochénard (French pronunciation: [la ʁɔʃenaʁ]) is a commune in the Deux-Sèvres department in western France.

== See also ==
- Communes of the Deux-Sèvres department
