= Villefollet =

- Commune
- Location of Villefollet
- Location within France Location within Nouvelle-Aquitaine
- Coordinates: 46°07′36″N 0°15′57″W
- Country: France
- Region: Nouvelle-Aquitaine
- Department: Deux-Sèvres
- Arrondissement: Niort
- Canton: Mignon-et-Boutonne

Government
  - Mayor (2020–2026): Jean-Pierre Nivelle
- Area^{1}: 13.04 km^{2} (5.03 sq mi)
- Elevation: 58 m (190 ft)
- Highest elevation: 80 m (260 ft)
- Lowest elevation: 41 m (135 ft)
- Population (2023): 203
  - Density: 15.6/km^{2} (40.3/sq mi)
- Time zone: UTC+01:00 (CET)
  - Summer (DST): UTC+02:00 (CEST)
- INSEE/Postal code: 79348 /79170
- ^{1} French Land Register data, which excludes lakes, ponds, glaciers > 1 km^{2} (0.386 sq mi or 247 acres) and river estuaries.

Villefollet (French pronunciation: [vilfɔlɛ]) is a commune in the Deux-Sèvres department in western France.

== Geography ==
The commune is traversed by the river Boutonne.

== See also ==
- Communes of the Deux-Sèvres department
