= Périgné =

- Commune
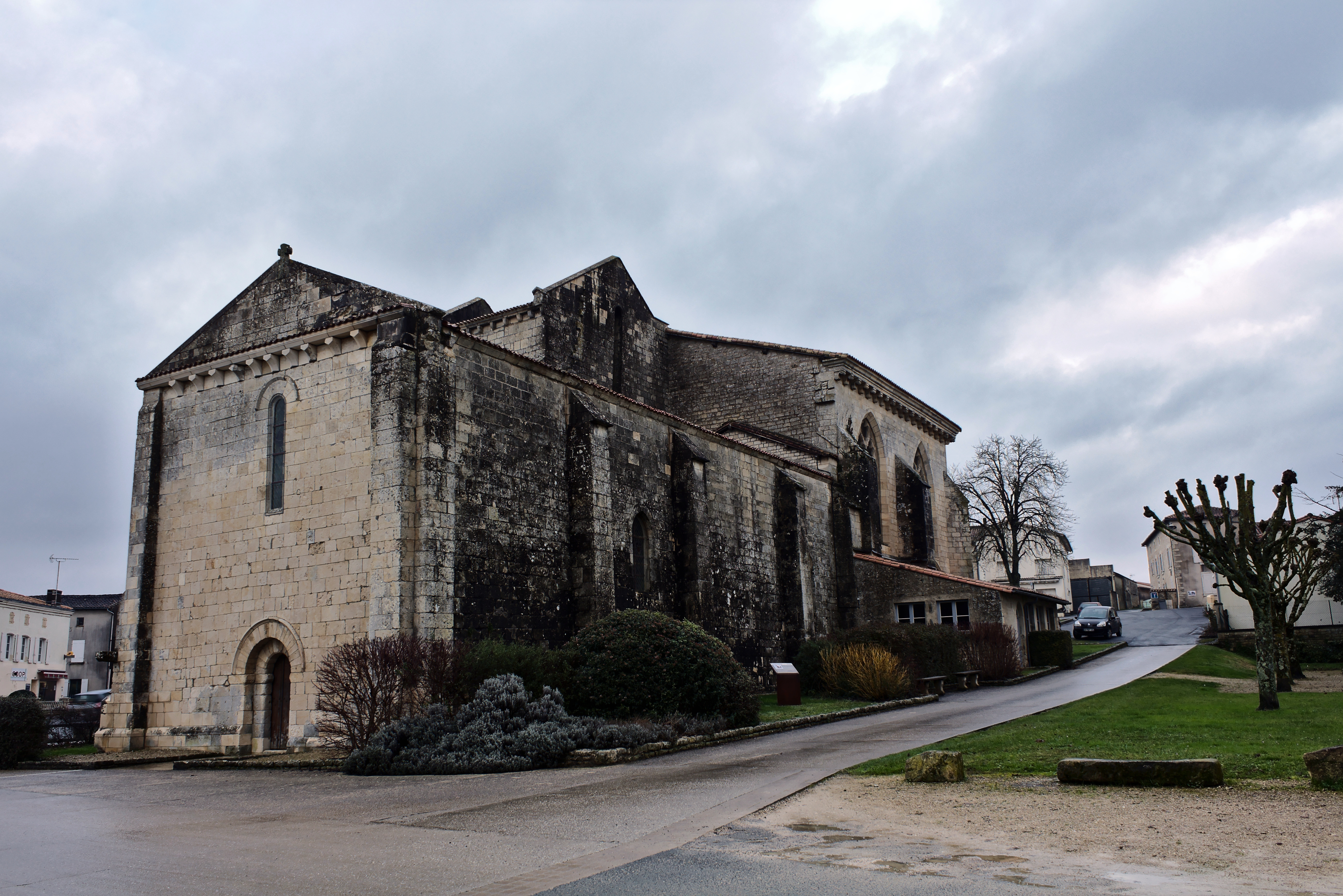
- The church in Périgné
- Location of Périgné
- Location within France Location within Nouvelle-Aquitaine
- Coordinates: 46°11′19″N 0°15′14″W
- Country: France
- Region: Nouvelle-Aquitaine
- Department: Deux-Sèvres
- Arrondissement: Niort
- Canton: Mignon-et-Boutonne

Government
  - Mayor (2024–2026): Etienne Chesneau
- Area^{1}: 21.18 km^{2} (8.18 sq mi)
- Elevation: 85 m (279 ft)
- Highest elevation: 103 m (338 ft)
- Lowest elevation: 45 m (148 ft)
- Population (2023): 932
  - Density: 44.0/km^{2} (114/sq mi)
- Time zone: UTC+01:00 (CET)
  - Summer (DST): UTC+02:00 (CEST)
- INSEE/Postal code: 79204 /79170
- ^{1} French Land Register data, which excludes lakes, ponds, glaciers > 1 km^{2} (0.386 sq mi or 247 acres) and river estuaries.

Périgné (French pronunciation: [peʁiɲe]) is a commune in the Deux-Sèvres department in western France. The writer and film critic Pascal Mérigeau was born in Périgné.

== See also ==
- Communes of the Deux-Sèvres department
