= Pascal Mérigeau =

French journalist and film critic

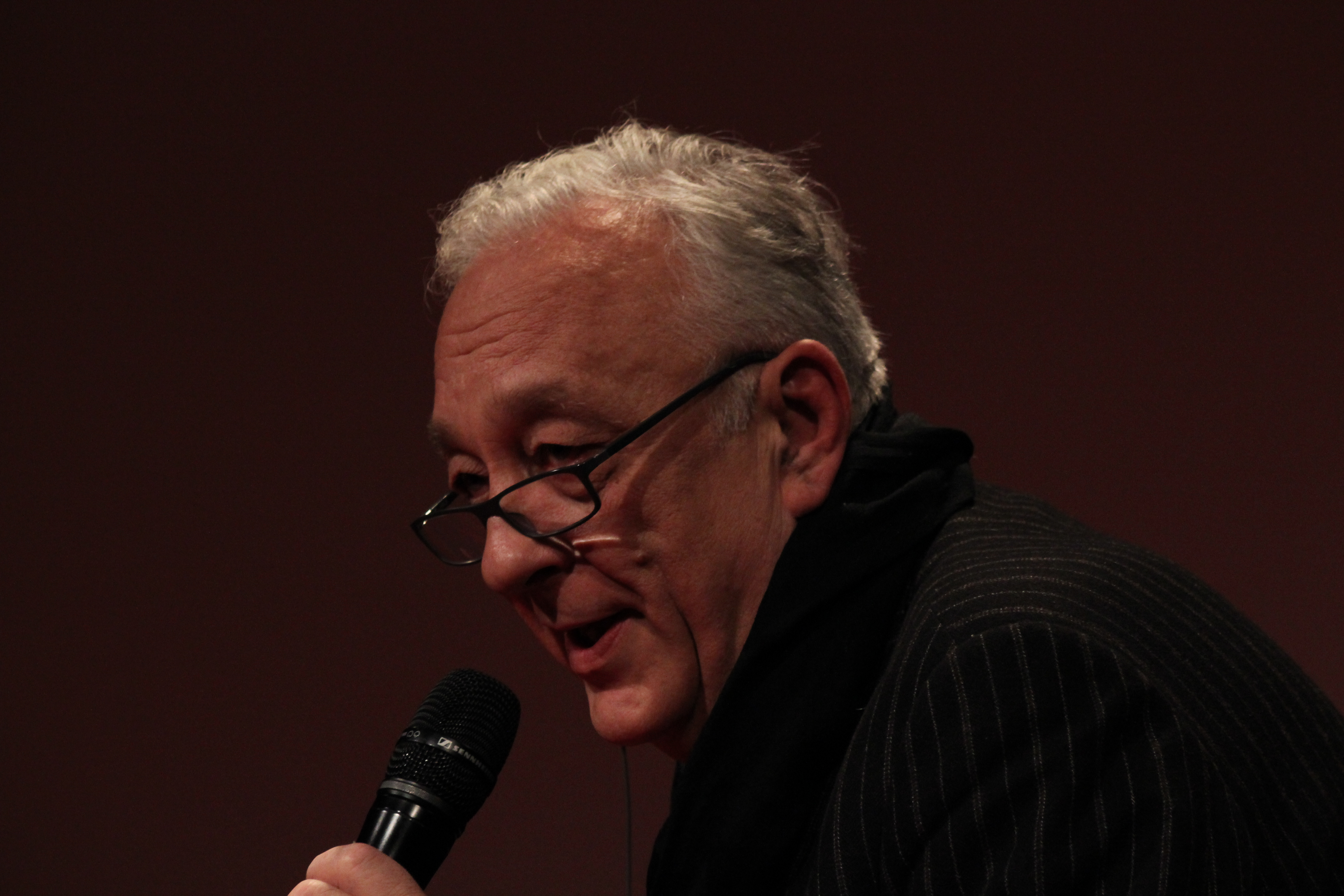
Pascal Mérigeau on 28 November 2014 during the Master Class on John Boorman in Paris.

Pascal Mérigeau (30 January 1953, Périgné in Deux-Sèvres) is a French journalist and film critic.

== Biography ==
After studying in Poitiers, he settled in Paris in 1976 and became a journalist. He worked for film magazines, then for Les Nouvelles littéraires, Le Point and Le Monde, before collaborating to Le Nouvel Observateur from September 1997.

He participated in the selection of films for the Cannes Film Festival, currently replaced by Eric Libiot.

A novelist, he also writes short stories, including Quand Angèle fut seule written in 1983. (Note: Published in the magazine Polar)

== Publications ==
Novels

- Escaliers dérobés, Denoël, 1994
- Max Lang n'est plus ici, Denoël, 1999

on cinema

- Faye Dunaway, PAC, 1978
- Annie Girardot, PAC, 1978
- Josef Von Sternberg, Edilig, 1983
- Série B (with Stéphane Bourgoin), Edilig, 1983
- Gene Tierney, Edilig, 1987
- Mankiewicz, Denoël, 1993
- L'aventure vraie de Canal +, with Jacques bayard, 2001
- Maurice Pialat. L'Imprécateur, Grasset, 2003
- Pialat, la rage au cœur, Ramsay, 2007
- Cinéma : autopsie d'un meurtre, Flammarion, 2007
- Depardieu, Flammarion, 2008
- Jean Renoir, Flammarion, 2012

== Honours ==
- 1995: Prize for best book on cinema, for Mankiewicz
- 2010: Raymond Chirat Prize (Lumière Film Festival)
- 2013: Prize for the best French book on cinema & Prix Goncourt de la biographie for Jean Renoir
