= Mauzé-sur-le-Mignon =

- Commune
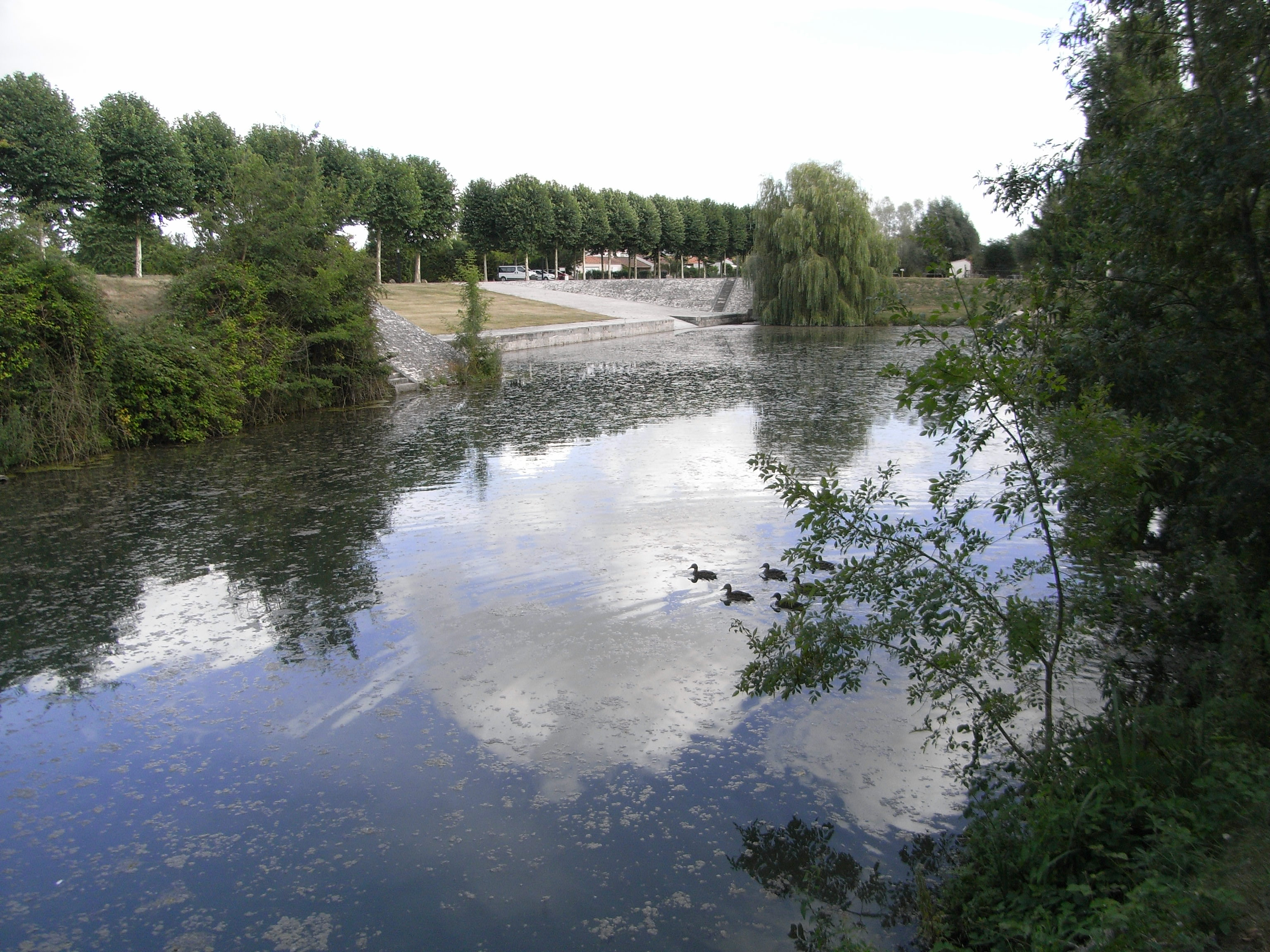
- The old port of Mauzé-sur-le-Mignon

- Coat of arms
- Location of Mauzé-sur-le-Mignon
- Location within France Location within Nouvelle-Aquitaine
- Coordinates: 46°11′46″N 0°40′11″W
- Country: France
- Region: Nouvelle-Aquitaine
- Department: Deux-Sèvres
- Arrondissement: Niort
- Canton: Mignon-et-Boutonne
- Intercommunality: CA Niortais

Government
  - Mayor (2020–2026): Philippe Mauffrey
- Area^{1}: 23.62 km^{2} (9.12 sq mi)
- Highest elevation: 46 m (151 ft)
- Lowest elevation: 6 m (20 ft)
- Population (2023): 2,941
  - Density: 124.5/km^{2} (322.5/sq mi)
- Time zone: UTC+01:00 (CET)
  - Summer (DST): UTC+02:00 (CEST)
- INSEE/Postal code: 79170 /79210
- ^{1} French Land Register data, which excludes lakes, ponds, glaciers > 1 km^{2} (0.386 sq mi or 247 acres) and river estuaries.

Mauzé-sur-le-Mignon (French pronunciation: [moze syʁ lə miɲɔ̃]) is a commune in the Deux-Sèvres department in western France. It is the birthplace of explorer René Caillié.

== Population ==
Historical population
Year	Pop.	±% p.a.
1968	2,486	—
1975	2,502	+0.09%
1982	2,405	−0.56%
1990	2,378	−0.14%
1999	2,385	+0.03%
2007	2,675	+1.44%
2012	2,772	+0.71%
2017	2,818	+0.33%
2023	2,941	+0.71%
Source: INSEE

== See also ==
- Communes of the Deux-Sèvres department
