= Saint-Hilaire-la-Palud =

- Commune
- Coat of arms
- Location of Saint-Hilaire-la-Palud
- Location within France Location within Nouvelle-Aquitaine
- Coordinates: 46°15′51″N 0°42′39″W
- Country: France
- Region: Nouvelle-Aquitaine
- Department: Deux-Sèvres
- Arrondissement: Niort
- Canton: Mignon-et-Boutonne
- Intercommunality: CA Niortais

Government
  - Mayor (2020–2026): François Bonnet
- Area^{1}: 34.12 km^{2} (13.17 sq mi)
- Elevation: 10 m (33 ft)
- Highest elevation: 30 m (98 ft)
- Lowest elevation: 1 m (3.3 ft)
- Population (2023): 1,498
  - Density: 43.90/km^{2} (113.7/sq mi)
- Time zone: UTC+01:00 (CET)
  - Summer (DST): UTC+02:00 (CEST)
- INSEE/Postal code: 79257 /79210
- ^{1} French Land Register data, which excludes lakes, ponds, glaciers > 1 km^{2} (0.386 sq mi or 247 acres) and river estuaries.

Saint-Hilaire-la-Palud (French pronunciation: [sɛ̃.t‿ilɛʁ la paly]) is a commune in the Deux-Sèvres department in western France.

== See also ==
- Communes of the Deux-Sèvres department
