= Saint-Georges-de-Rex =

- Commune
- Location of Saint-Georges-de-Rex
- Location within France Location within Nouvelle-Aquitaine
- Coordinates: 46°16′44″N 0°39′08″W
- Country: France
- Region: Nouvelle-Aquitaine
- Department: Deux-Sèvres
- Arrondissement: Niort
- Canton: Mignon-et-Boutonne
- Intercommunality: CA Niortais

Government
  - Mayor (2020–2026): Alain Liaigre
- Area^{1}: 17.63 km^{2} (6.81 sq mi)
- Elevation: 17 m (56 ft)
- Highest elevation: 37 m (121 ft)
- Lowest elevation: 2 m (6.6 ft)
- Population (2023): 431
  - Density: 24.4/km^{2} (63.3/sq mi)
- Time zone: UTC+01:00 (CET)
  - Summer (DST): UTC+02:00 (CEST)
- INSEE/Postal code: 79254 /79210
- ^{1} French Land Register data, which excludes lakes, ponds, glaciers > 1 km^{2} (0.386 sq mi or 247 acres) and river estuaries.

Saint-Georges-de-Rex is a commune in the Deux-Sèvres department in western France.

== See also ==
- Communes of the Deux-Sèvres department
