= Lusseray =

- Commune
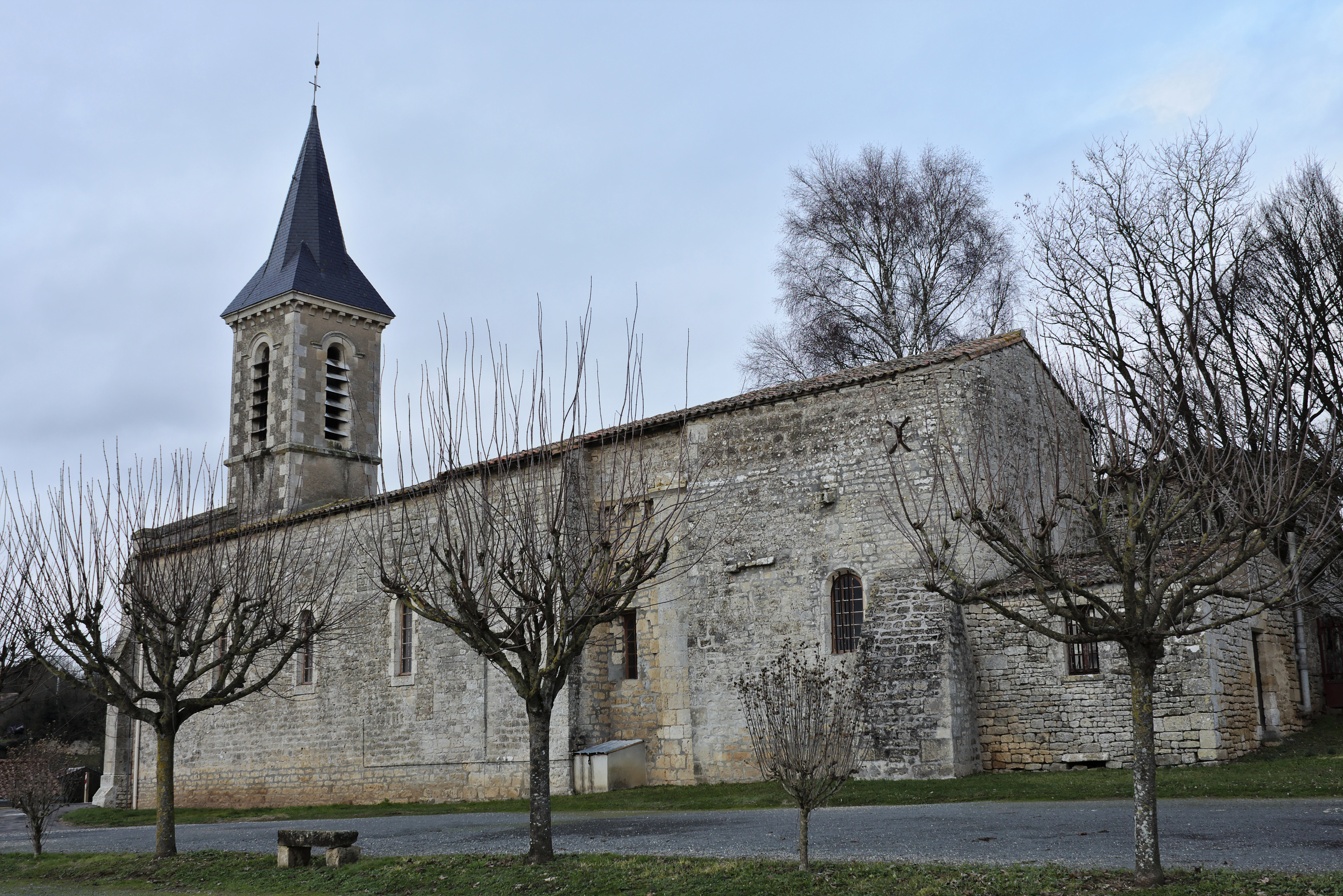
- The church in Lusseray
- Location of Lusseray
- Location within France Location within Nouvelle-Aquitaine
- Coordinates: 46°08′49″N 0°09′54″W
- Country: France
- Region: Nouvelle-Aquitaine
- Department: Deux-Sèvres
- Arrondissement: Niort
- Canton: Mignon-et-Boutonne

Government
  - Mayor (2020–2026): François Durgand
- Area^{1}: 8.14 km^{2} (3.14 sq mi)
- Elevation: 70 m (230 ft)
- Highest elevation: 111 m (364 ft)
- Lowest elevation: 58 m (190 ft)
- Population (2023): 172
  - Density: 21.1/km^{2} (54.7/sq mi)
- Time zone: UTC+01:00 (CET)
  - Summer (DST): UTC+02:00 (CEST)
- INSEE/Postal code: 79160 /79170
- ^{1} French Land Register data, which excludes lakes, ponds, glaciers > 1 km^{2} (0.386 sq mi or 247 acres) and river estuaries.

Lusseray (French pronunciation: [lysʁɛ]) is a commune in the Deux-Sèvres department in western France.

== Geography ==
The commune is traversed by the river Boutonne.

== See also ==
- Communes of the Deux-Sèvres department
