= Marigny, Deux-Sèvres =

Marigny
- Commune
- Location of Marigny
- Location within France Location within Nouvelle-Aquitaine
- Coordinates: 46°11′54″N 0°24′59″W
- Country: France
- Region: Nouvelle-Aquitaine
- Department: Deux-Sèvres
- Arrondissement: Niort
- Canton: Mignon-et-Boutonne
- Intercommunality: CA Niortais

Government
  - Mayor (2020–2026): Daniel Baudouin
- Area^{1}: 31.72 km^{2} (12.25 sq mi)
- Highest elevation: 98 m (322 ft)
- Lowest elevation: 32 m (105 ft)
- Population (2023): 902
  - Density: 28.4/km^{2} (73.6/sq mi)
- Time zone: UTC+01:00 (CET)
  - Summer (DST): UTC+02:00 (CEST)
- INSEE/Postal code: 79166 /79360
- ^{1} French Land Register data, which excludes lakes, ponds, glaciers > 1 km^{2} (0.386 sq mi or 247 acres) and river estuaries.

Marigny (French pronunciation: [maʁiɲi]) is a commune in the Deux-Sèvres department in western France.

== See also ==
- Communes of the Deux-Sèvres department
