= Les Fosses =

- Commune
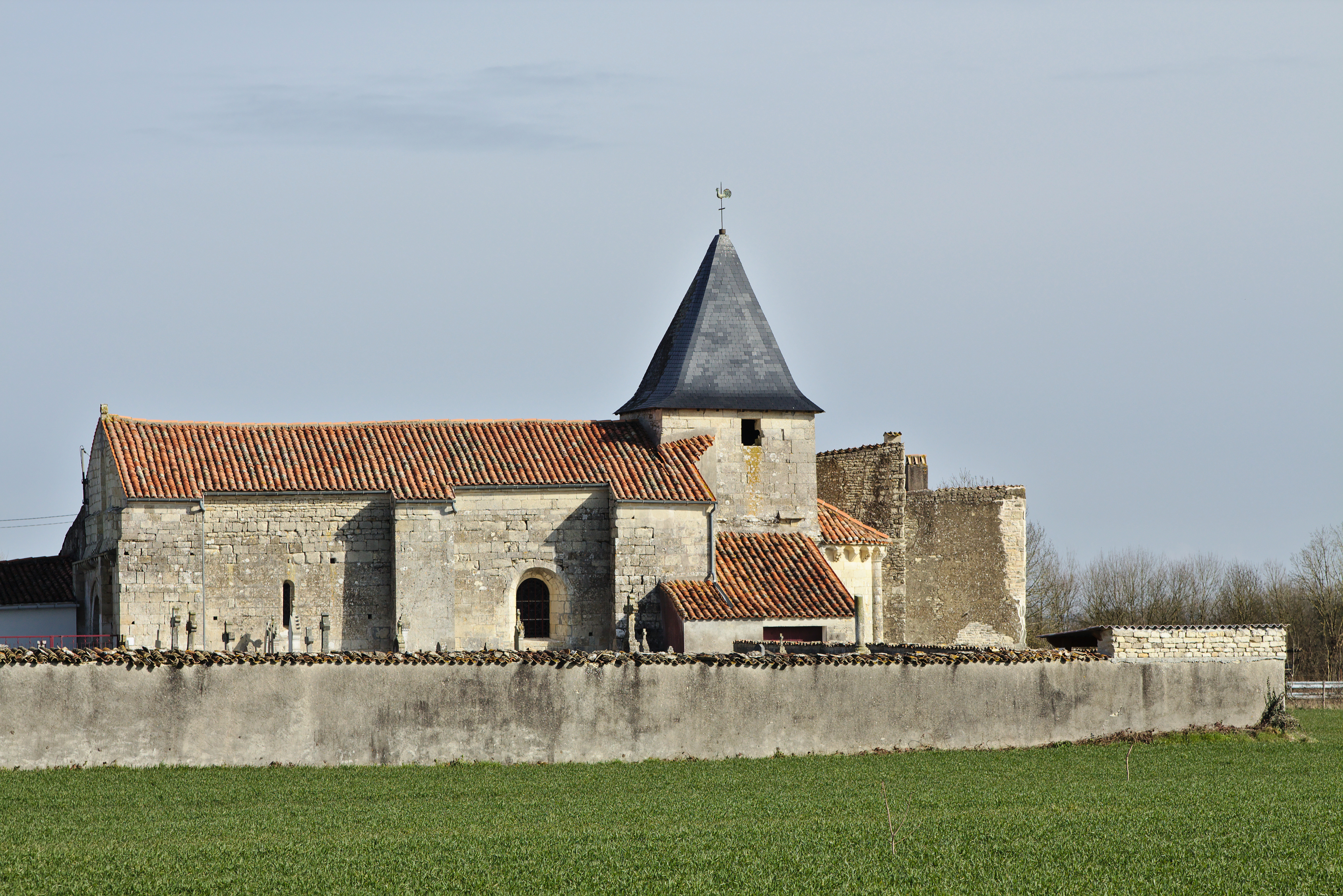
- The church in Les Fosses
- Location of Les Fosses
- Location within France Location within Nouvelle-Aquitaine
- Coordinates: 46°10′21″N 0°21′11″W
- Country: France
- Region: Nouvelle-Aquitaine
- Department: Deux-Sèvres
- Arrondissement: Niort
- Canton: Mignon-et-Boutonne
- Intercommunality: Mellois en Poitou

Government
  - Mayor (2020–2026): Guénaëlle Archimbaud-Boiroux
- Area^{1}: 12.04 km^{2} (4.65 sq mi)
- Elevation: 70 m (230 ft)
- Highest elevation: 101 m (331 ft)
- Lowest elevation: 51 m (167 ft)
- Population (2023): 425
  - Density: 35.3/km^{2} (91.4/sq mi)
- Time zone: UTC+01:00 (CET)
  - Summer (DST): UTC+02:00 (CEST)
- INSEE/Postal code: 79126 /79360
- ^{1} French Land Register data, which excludes lakes, ponds, glaciers > 1 km^{2} (0.386 sq mi or 247 acres) and river estuaries.

Les Fosses (French pronunciation: [le fos]) is a commune in the Deux-Sèvres department in the Nouvelle-Aquitaine region in western France.

== See also ==
- Communes of the Deux-Sèvres department
