= Beauvoir-sur-Niort =

- Commune
- Location of Beauvoir-sur-Niort
- Location within France Location within Nouvelle-Aquitaine
- Coordinates: 46°10′49″N 0°28′22″W
- Country: France
- Region: Nouvelle-Aquitaine
- Department: Deux-Sèvres
- Arrondissement: Niort
- Canton: Mignon-et-Boutonne
- Intercommunality: CA Niortais

Government
  - Mayor (2020–2026): Séverine Vachon
- Area^{1}: 23.48 km^{2} (9.07 sq mi)
- Elevation: 72 m (236 ft)
- Highest elevation: 90 m (300 ft)
- Lowest elevation: 36 m (118 ft)
- Population (2023): 1,765
  - Density: 75.17/km^{2} (194.7/sq mi)
- Time zone: UTC+01:00 (CET)
  - Summer (DST): UTC+02:00 (CEST)
- INSEE/Postal code: 79031 /79360
- ^{1} French Land Register data, which excludes lakes, ponds, glaciers > 1 km^{2} (0.386 sq mi or 247 acres) and river estuaries.

Beauvoir-sur-Niort (French pronunciation: [bovwaʁ syʁ njɔʁ], literally Beauvoir on Niort) is a commune in the Deux-Sèvres department, Nouvelle-Aquitaine, western France.

== See also ==
- Communes of the Deux-Sèvres department
