= Val-du-Mignon =

- Commune
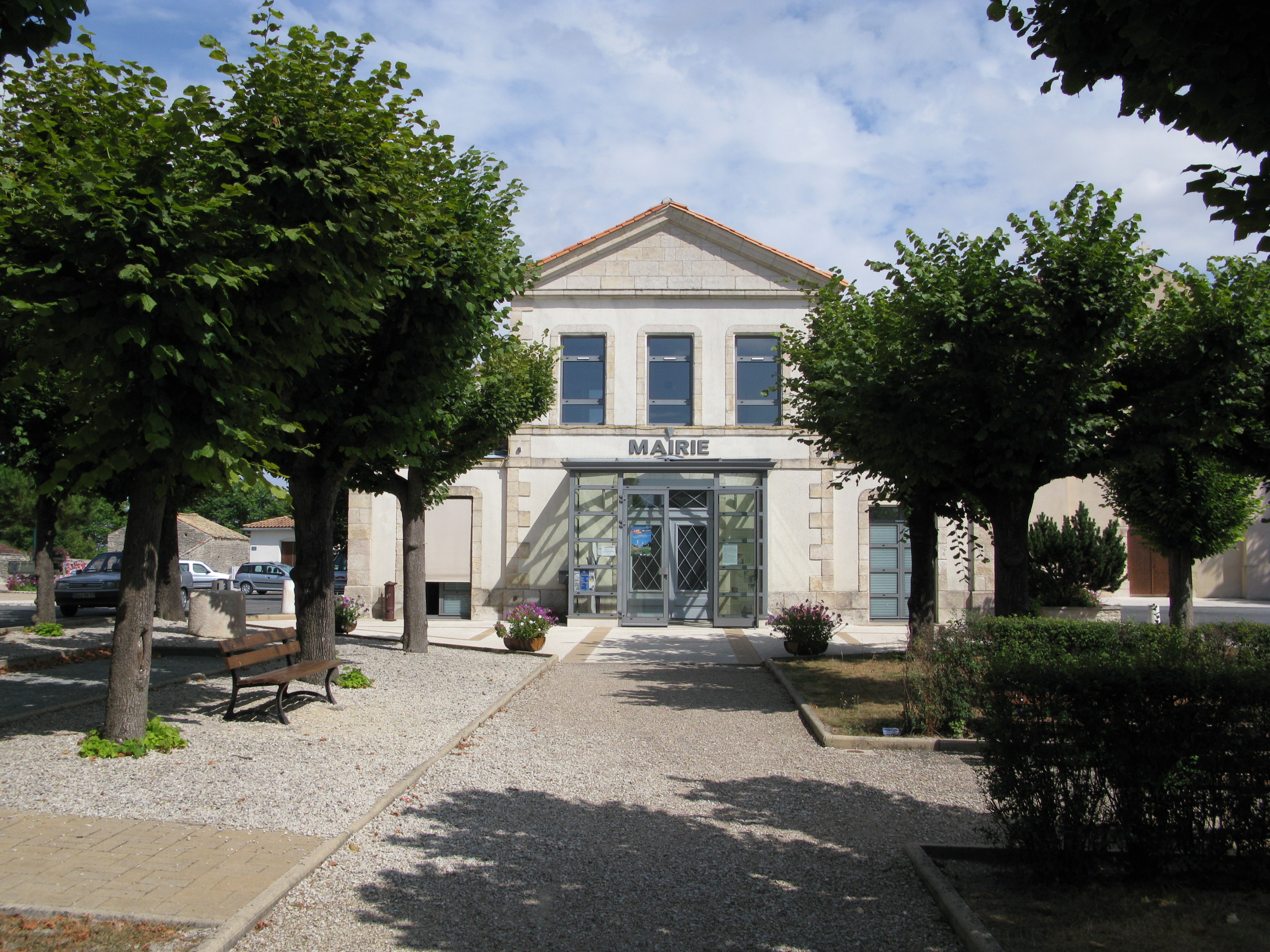
- The town hall in Usseau
- Location of Val-du-Mignon
- Location within France Location within Nouvelle-Aquitaine
- Coordinates: 46°10′29″N 0°34′44″W
- Country: France
- Region: Nouvelle-Aquitaine
- Department: Deux-Sèvres
- Arrondissement: Niort
- Canton: Mignon-et-Boutonne
- Intercommunality: CA Niortais
- Area^{1}: 28.34 km^{2} (10.94 sq mi)
- Highest elevation: 52 m (171 ft)
- Lowest elevation: 18 m (59 ft)
- Population (2023): 1,092
  - Density: 38.53/km^{2} (99.80/sq mi)
- Time zone: UTC+01:00 (CET)
  - Summer (DST): UTC+02:00 (CEST)
- INSEE/Postal code: 79334 /79210
- ^{1} French Land Register data, which excludes lakes, ponds, glaciers > 1 km^{2} (0.386 sq mi or 247 acres) and river estuaries.

Val-du-Mignon (French pronunciation: [val dy miɲɔ̃]) is a commune in the Deux-Sèvres department in western France. It was established on 1 January 2019 by merger of the former communes of Usseau (the seat), Priaires and Thorigny-sur-le-Mignon.

== See also ==
- Communes of the Deux-Sèvres department
