= Prin-Deyrançon =

- Commune
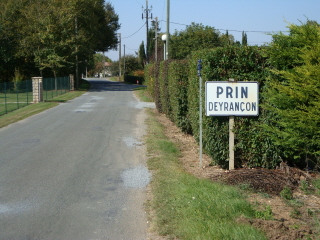
- The road into Prin-Deyrançon
- Location of Prin-Deyrançon
- Location within France Location within Nouvelle-Aquitaine
- Coordinates: 46°13′21″N 0°38′06″W
- Country: France
- Region: Nouvelle-Aquitaine
- Department: Deux-Sèvres
- Arrondissement: Niort
- Canton: Mignon-et-Boutonne
- Intercommunality: CA Niortais

Government
  - Mayor (2020–2026): Olivier D'Araujo
- Area^{1}: 16.13 km^{2} (6.23 sq mi)
- Elevation: 17 m (56 ft)
- Highest elevation: 37 m (121 ft)
- Lowest elevation: 4 m (13 ft)
- Population (2023): 593
  - Density: 36.8/km^{2} (95.2/sq mi)
- Time zone: UTC+01:00 (CET)
  - Summer (DST): UTC+02:00 (CEST)
- INSEE/Postal code: 79220 /79210
- ^{1} French Land Register data, which excludes lakes, ponds, glaciers > 1 km^{2} (0.386 sq mi or 247 acres) and river estuaries.

Prin-Deyrançon (French pronunciation: [pʁɛ̃ deʁɑ̃sɔ̃]) is a commune in the Deux-Sèvres department in western France.

== See also ==
- Communes of the Deux-Sèvres department
