= Brieuil-sur-Chizé =

- Commune
- Location of Brieuil-sur-Chizé
- Location within France Location within Nouvelle-Aquitaine
- Coordinates: 46°07′09″N 0°19′18″W
- Country: France
- Region: Nouvelle-Aquitaine
- Department: Deux-Sèvres
- Arrondissement: Niort
- Canton: Mignon-et-Boutonne

Government
  - Mayor (2020–2026): Marylène Picard
- Area^{1}: 8.06 km^{2} (3.11 sq mi)
- Elevation: 50 m (160 ft)
- Highest elevation: 82 m (269 ft)
- Lowest elevation: 40 m (130 ft)
- Population (2023): 86
  - Density: 11/km^{2} (28/sq mi)
- Time zone: UTC+01:00 (CET)
  - Summer (DST): UTC+02:00 (CEST)
- INSEE/Postal code: 79055 /79170
- ^{1} French Land Register data, which excludes lakes, ponds, glaciers > 1 km^{2} (0.386 sq mi or 247 acres) and river estuaries.

Brieuil-sur-Chizé is a commune in the Deux-Sèvres department in the Nouvelle-Aquitaine region in western France.

== Geography ==
The commune is traversed by the river Boutonne.

== See also ==
- Communes of the Deux-Sèvres department
