= Brioux-sur-Boutonne =

- Commune
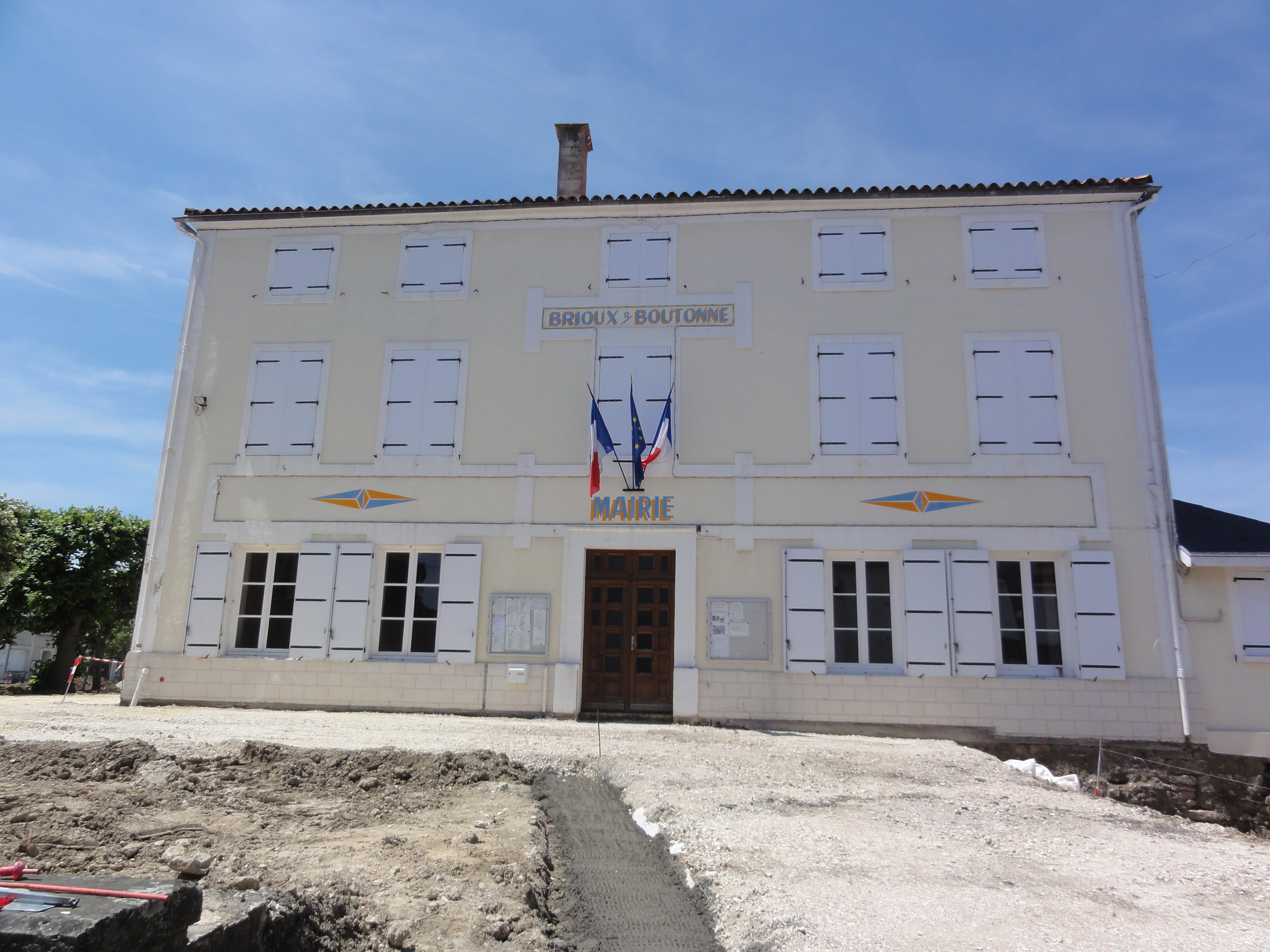
- The town hall in Brioux-sur-Boutonne

- Coat of arms
- Location of Brioux-sur-Boutonne
- Location within France Location within Nouvelle-Aquitaine
- Coordinates: 46°08′35″N 0°13′19″W
- Country: France
- Region: Nouvelle-Aquitaine
- Department: Deux-Sèvres
- Arrondissement: Niort
- Canton: Mignon-et-Boutonne

Government
  - Mayor (2020–2026): Jean-Marie Haye
- Area^{1}: 15.49 km^{2} (5.98 sq mi)
- Highest elevation: 94 m (308 ft)
- Lowest elevation: 51 m (167 ft)
- Population (2023): 1,440
  - Density: 93.0/km^{2} (241/sq mi)
- Time zone: UTC+01:00 (CET)
  - Summer (DST): UTC+02:00 (CEST)
- INSEE/Postal code: 79057 /79170
- ^{1} French Land Register data, which excludes lakes, ponds, glaciers > 1 km^{2} (0.386 sq mi or 247 acres) and river estuaries.

Brioux-sur-Boutonne (French pronunciation: [bʁiju syʁ butɔn], literally Brioux on Boutonne) is a commune in the Deux-Sèvres department in the Nouvelle-Aquitaine region in western France.

== Geography ==
The river Boutonne runs across the village.

== See also ==
- Communes of the Deux-Sèvres department
