= Luché-sur-Brioux =

Commune in Deux-Sèvres, France

- Commune
- Location of Luché-sur-Brioux
- Location within France Location within Nouvelle-Aquitaine
- Coordinates: 46°07′54″N 0°08′55″W
- Country: France
- Region: Nouvelle-Aquitaine
- Department: Deux-Sèvres
- Arrondissement: Niort
- Canton: Mignon-et-Boutonne

Government
  - Mayor (2023–2026): Grégory Mann
- Area^{1}: 5.16 km^{2} (1.99 sq mi)
- Elevation: 74 m (243 ft)
- Highest elevation: 101 m (331 ft)
- Lowest elevation: 63 m (207 ft)
- Population (2023): 119
  - Density: 23.1/km^{2} (59.7/sq mi)
- Time zone: UTC+01:00 (CET)
  - Summer (DST): UTC+02:00 (CEST)
- INSEE/Postal code: 79158 /79170
- ^{1} French Land Register data, which excludes lakes, ponds, glaciers > 1 km^{2} (0.386 sq mi or 247 acres) and river estuaries.

Luché-sur-Brioux is a commune in the Deux-Sèvres department in western France.

== See also ==
- Communes of the Deux-Sèvres department
