= Séligné =

- Commune
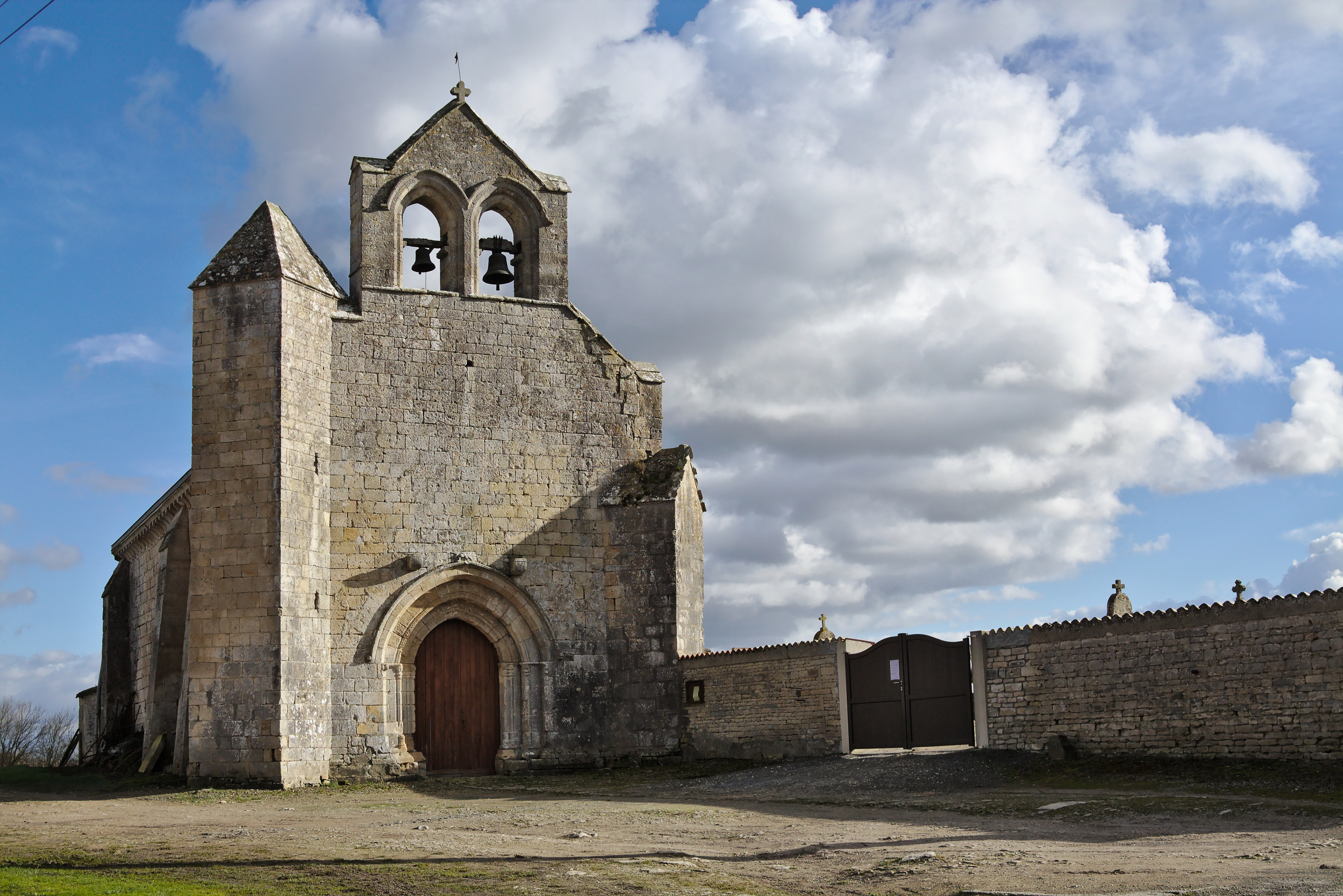
- The church of Our Lady, in Séligné
- Location of Séligné
- Location within France Location within Nouvelle-Aquitaine
- Coordinates: 46°08′42″N 0°16′58″W
- Country: France
- Region: Nouvelle-Aquitaine
- Department: Deux-Sèvres
- Arrondissement: Niort
- Canton: Mignon-et-Boutonne

Government
  - Mayor (2023–2026): Monique Archaimbault
- Area^{1}: 9.83 km^{2} (3.80 sq mi)
- Elevation: 47 m (154 ft)
- Highest elevation: 60 m (200 ft)
- Lowest elevation: 41 m (135 ft)
- Population (2023): 110
  - Density: 11/km^{2} (29/sq mi)
- Time zone: UTC+01:00 (CET)
  - Summer (DST): UTC+02:00 (CEST)
- INSEE/Postal code: 79312 /79170
- ^{1} French Land Register data, which excludes lakes, ponds, glaciers > 1 km^{2} (0.386 sq mi or 247 acres) and river estuaries.

Séligné (French pronunciation: [seliɲe]) is a commune in the Deux-Sèvres department in western France.

== Geography ==
The commune is traversed by the river Boutonne.

== See also ==
- Communes of the Deux-Sèvres department
