= Chérigné =

- Commune
- Location of Chérigné
- Location within France Location within Nouvelle-Aquitaine
- Coordinates: 46°07′26″N 0°10′15″W
- Country: France
- Region: Nouvelle-Aquitaine
- Department: Deux-Sèvres
- Arrondissement: Niort
- Canton: Mignon-et-Boutonne

Government
  - Mayor (2020–2026): Bernard Gaboreau
- Area^{1}: 7.88 km^{2} (3.04 sq mi)
- Elevation: 66 m (217 ft)
- Highest elevation: 115 m (377 ft)
- Lowest elevation: 58 m (190 ft)
- Population (2023): 134
  - Density: 17.0/km^{2} (44.0/sq mi)
- Time zone: UTC+01:00 (CET)
  - Summer (DST): UTC+02:00 (CEST)
- INSEE/Postal code: 79085 /79170
- ^{1} French Land Register data, which excludes lakes, ponds, glaciers > 1 km^{2} (0.386 sq mi or 247 acres) and river estuaries.

Chérigné (French pronunciation: [ʃeʁiɲe]) is a commune in the Deux-Sèvres department in the Nouvelle-Aquitaine region in western France.

== Geography ==
The commune is traversed by the river Boutonne.

== See also ==
- Communes of the Deux-Sèvres department
