= Secondigné-sur-Belle =

- Commune
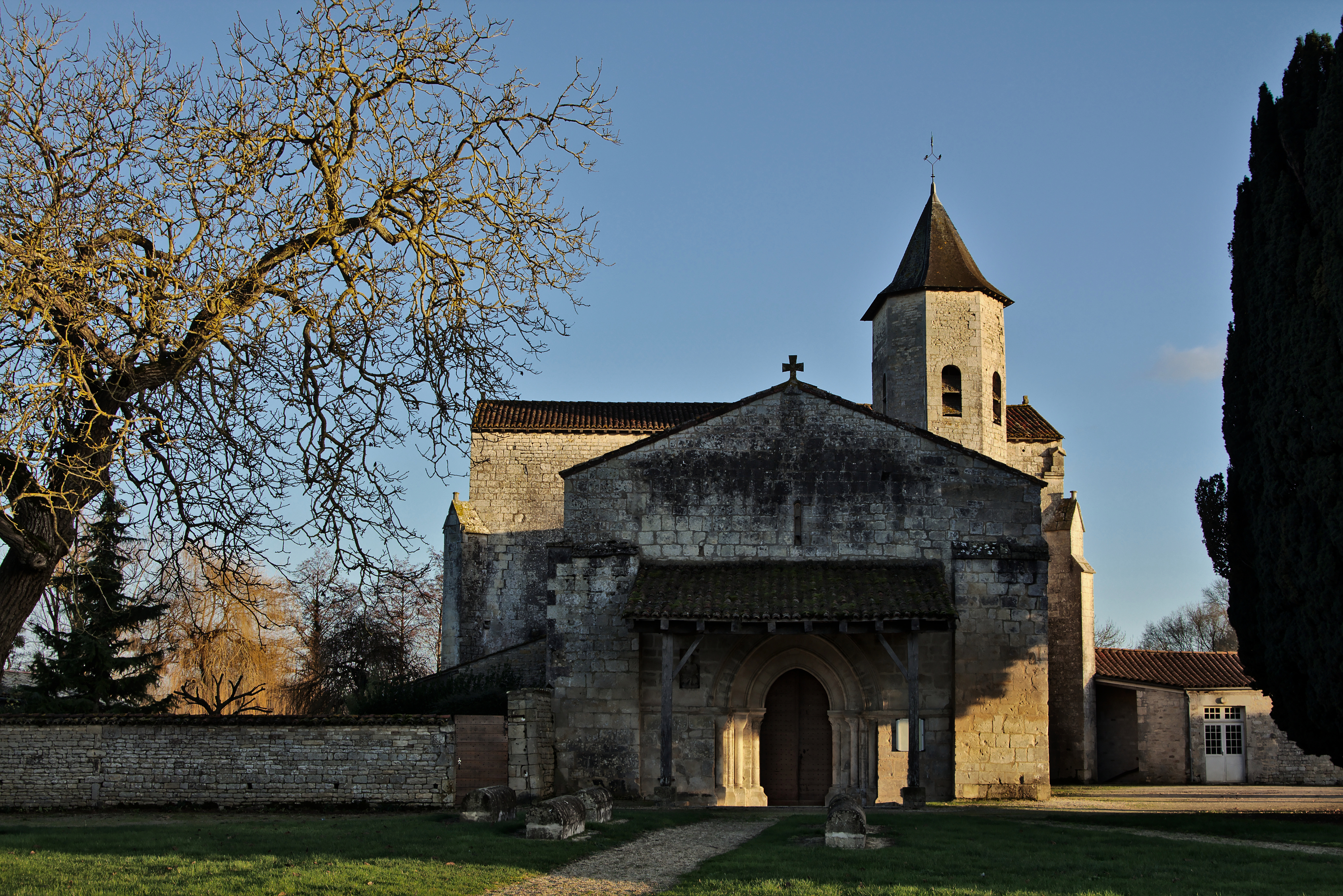
- The church in Secondigné-sur-Belle
- Location of Secondigné-sur-Belle
- Location within France Location within Nouvelle-Aquitaine
- Coordinates: 46°09′51″N 0°17′51″W
- Country: France
- Region: Nouvelle-Aquitaine
- Department: Deux-Sèvres
- Arrondissement: Niort
- Canton: Mignon-et-Boutonne

Government
  - Mayor (2020–2026): Nicolas Valery
- Area^{1}: 24.39 km^{2} (9.42 sq mi)
- Elevation: 49 m (161 ft)
- Highest elevation: 83 m (272 ft)
- Lowest elevation: 42 m (138 ft)
- Population (2023): 480
  - Density: 20/km^{2} (51/sq mi)
- Time zone: UTC+01:00 (CET)
  - Summer (DST): UTC+02:00 (CEST)
- INSEE/Postal code: 79310 /79170
- ^{1} French Land Register data, which excludes lakes, ponds, glaciers > 1 km^{2} (0.386 sq mi or 247 acres) and river estuaries.

Secondigné-sur-Belle (French pronunciation: [səɡɔ̃diɲe syʁ bɛl]) is a commune in the Deux-Sèvres department in western France.

== See also ==
- Communes of the Deux-Sèvres department
