= Le Bourdet =

- Commune
- Location of Le Bourdet
- Location within France Location within Nouvelle-Aquitaine
- Coordinates: 46°14′03″N 0°37′16″W
- Country: France
- Region: Nouvelle-Aquitaine
- Department: Deux-Sèvres
- Arrondissement: Niort
- Canton: Mignon-et-Boutonne
- Intercommunality: CA Niortais

Government
  - Mayor (2020–2026): Clément Cohen
- Area^{1}: 8.30 km^{2} (3.20 sq mi)
- Elevation: 17 m (56 ft)
- Highest elevation: 26 m (85 ft)
- Lowest elevation: 6 m (20 ft)
- Population (2023): 564
  - Density: 68.0/km^{2} (176/sq mi)
- Time zone: UTC+01:00 (CET)
  - Summer (DST): UTC+02:00 (CEST)
- INSEE/Postal code: 79046 /79210
- ^{1} French Land Register data, which excludes lakes, ponds, glaciers > 1 km^{2} (0.386 sq mi or 247 acres) and river estuaries.

Le Bourdet (French pronunciation: [lə buʁdɛ]) is a commune in the Deux-Sèvres department in the Nouvelle-Aquitaine region in western France.

== Sights ==
The Maraîchine path allows a cultural stroll in the heart of the "Marais Poitevin". It revolves around three interests:

- The preservation of a bovine species typical of the Marais: "the maraîchine";
- A botanical path where you can find most of the plants representative of the Marais;
- A geological route that allows you to discover the geological history of the region in a fun way.

== See also ==
- Communes of the Deux-Sèvres department
