= Juillé, Deux-Sèvres =

Juillé
- Commune
- Location of Juillé
- Location within France Location within Nouvelle-Aquitaine
- Coordinates: 46°07′00″N 0°12′56″W
- Country: France
- Region: Nouvelle-Aquitaine
- Department: Deux-Sèvres
- Arrondissement: Niort
- Canton: Mignon-et-Boutonne

Government
  - Mayor (2020–2026): Paul Jouannet
- Area^{1}: 4.87 km^{2} (1.88 sq mi)
- Elevation: 63 m (207 ft)
- Highest elevation: 104 m (341 ft)
- Lowest elevation: 57 m (187 ft)
- Population (2023): 98
  - Density: 20/km^{2} (52/sq mi)
- Time zone: UTC+01:00 (CET)
  - Summer (DST): UTC+02:00 (CEST)
- INSEE/Postal code: 79142 /79170
- ^{1} French Land Register data, which excludes lakes, ponds, glaciers > 1 km^{2} (0.386 sq mi or 247 acres) and river estuaries.

Juillé (French pronunciation: [ʒɥije]) is a commune in the Deux-Sèvres department in western France.

== See also ==
- Communes of the Deux-Sèvres department
