= Asnières-en-Poitou =

- Commune
- Location of Asnières-en-Poitou
- Location within France Location within Nouvelle-Aquitaine
- Coordinates: 46°06′15″N 0°11′49″W
- Country: France
- Region: Nouvelle-Aquitaine
- Department: Deux-Sèvres
- Arrondissement: Niort
- Canton: Mignon-et-Boutonne
- Intercommunality: Mellois-en-Poitou

Government
  - Mayor (2020–2026): Michel Barreaud
- Area^{1}: 19.06 km^{2} (7.36 sq mi)
- Elevation: 75 m (246 ft)
- Highest elevation: 142 m (466 ft)
- Lowest elevation: 60 m (200 ft)
- Population (2023): 188
  - Density: 9.86/km^{2} (25.5/sq mi)
- Time zone: UTC+01:00 (CET)
  - Summer (DST): UTC+02:00 (CEST)
- INSEE/Postal code: 79015 /79170
- ^{1} French Land Register data, which excludes lakes, ponds, glaciers > 1 km^{2} (0.386 sq mi or 247 acres) and river estuaries.

Asnières-en-Poitou (French pronunciation: [ɑnjɛʁ ɑ̃ pwatu]; literally "Asnières in Poitou") is a large commune in the Deux-Sèvres department in the Nouvelle-Aquitaine region in western France.

== See also ==
- Communes of the Deux-Sèvres department
