= Chizé =

- Commune
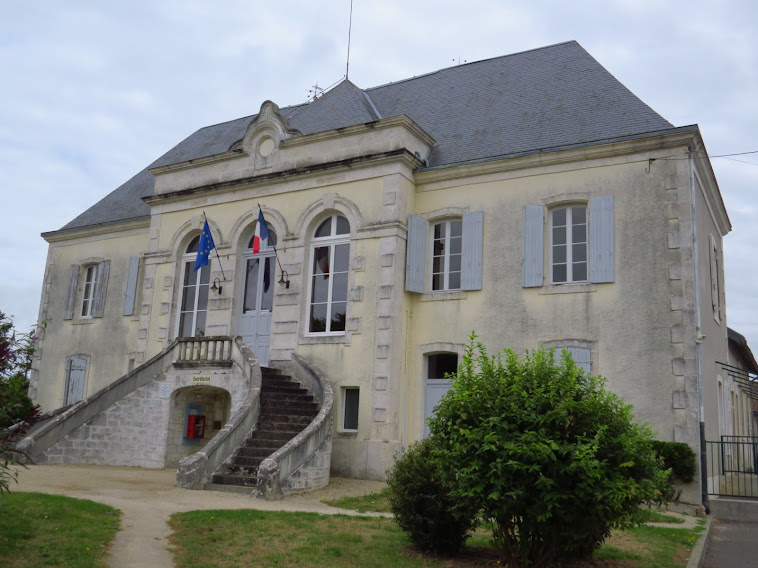
- Town hall
- Location of Chizé
- Location within France Location within Nouvelle-Aquitaine
- Coordinates: 46°06′59″N 0°20′47″W
- Country: France
- Region: Nouvelle-Aquitaine
- Department: Deux-Sèvres
- Arrondissement: Niort
- Canton: Mignon-et-Boutonne

Government
  - Mayor (2020–2026): Daniel Barré
- Area^{1}: 23.50 km^{2} (9.07 sq mi)
- Elevation: 50 m (160 ft)
- Highest elevation: 105 m (344 ft)
- Lowest elevation: 37 m (121 ft)
- Population (2023): 862
  - Density: 36.7/km^{2} (95.0/sq mi)
- Time zone: UTC+01:00 (CET)
  - Summer (DST): UTC+02:00 (CEST)
- INSEE/Postal code: 79090 /79170
- ^{1} French Land Register data, which excludes lakes, ponds, glaciers > 1 km^{2} (0.386 sq mi or 247 acres) and river estuaries.

Chizé (French pronunciation: [ʃize]) is a commune in the Deux-Sèvres department in the Nouvelle-Aquitaine region in western France. In January 1973 it absorbed the former commune Availles-sur-Chizé.

== Geography ==
The commune is traversed by the river Boutonne.

== See also ==
- Communes of the Deux-Sèvres department
