= Villiers-en-Bois =

- Commune
- Location of Villiers-en-Bois
- Location within France Location within Nouvelle-Aquitaine
- Coordinates: 46°08′56″N 0°24′20″W
- Country: France
- Region: Nouvelle-Aquitaine
- Department: Deux-Sèvres
- Arrondissement: Niort
- Canton: Mignon-et-Boutonne

Government
  - Mayor (2020–2026): Patrice Hucteau
- Area^{1}: 18.53 km^{2} (7.15 sq mi)
- Elevation: 80 m (260 ft)
- Highest elevation: 99 m (325 ft)
- Lowest elevation: 49 m (161 ft)
- Population (2023): 127
  - Density: 6.85/km^{2} (17.8/sq mi)
- Time zone: UTC+01:00 (CET)
  - Summer (DST): UTC+02:00 (CEST)
- INSEE/Postal code: 79350 /79360
- ^{1} French Land Register data, which excludes lakes, ponds, glaciers > 1 km^{2} (0.386 sq mi or 247 acres) and river estuaries.

Villiers-en-Bois (French pronunciation: [vilje ɑ̃ bwa]) is a commune in the Deux-Sèvres department in western France.

== See also ==
- Communes of the Deux-Sèvres department
