= Paizay-le-Chapt =

- Commune
- Location of Paizay-le-Chapt
- Location within France Location within Nouvelle-Aquitaine
- Coordinates: 46°05′01″N 0°10′35″W
- Country: France
- Region: Nouvelle-Aquitaine
- Department: Deux-Sèvres
- Arrondissement: Niort
- Canton: Mignon-et-Boutonne

Government
  - Mayor (2020–2026): Jacques Berton
- Area^{1}: 20.34 km^{2} (7.85 sq mi)
- Elevation: 97 m (318 ft)
- Highest elevation: 149 m (489 ft)
- Lowest elevation: 76 m (249 ft)
- Population (2023): 258
  - Density: 12.7/km^{2} (32.9/sq mi)
- Time zone: UTC+01:00 (CET)
  - Summer (DST): UTC+02:00 (CEST)
- INSEE/Postal code: 79198 /79170
- ^{1} French Land Register data, which excludes lakes, ponds, glaciers > 1 km^{2} (0.386 sq mi or 247 acres) and river estuaries.

Paizay-le-Chapt is a small commune in the Deux-Sèvres department of the region Nouvelle-Aquitaine in western France. The town of Paizay-le-Chapt is part of the canton of Mignon-et-Boutonne and the arrondissement of Niort.

History

Paizay-le-Chapt is mentionned as early as the XIth century under the latin name "Paizacum", although the village itself appears to have existed since roman times. The remains of what is believed to be a roman fort can be found a mile or two South-West of the village, on the edge of the Forêt d'Aulnay between the hamlets of Ré and Le Beau Village (local name "Le Cul").

The Church door, cross and an arch of late-gothic style of a medieval church can clearly be seen from the village square. These are the remains of Saint Maixent Church, an edifice built originally in the 11th century, renovated in the 15th or early 16th century and which was then pillaged during the French Revolution, and partly demolished in 1848. A crypt still lies underground where local nobility were buried. The current church of Saint Fulbert was built in 1855.

== Population and housing ==
The population of Paizay-le-Chapt was 257 in 1999, 262 in 2006 and 261 in 2018. The population density of Paizay-le-Chapt is 13/km^{2} (34/sq mi). The number of housing of Paizay-le-Chapt was 159 in 2007. These homes of Paizay-le-Chapt consist of 114 main residences, 30 second or occasional homes and 15 vacant homes.

== See also ==
- Communes of the Deux-Sèvres department
