= Arrondissement of Niort =

Coordinates: 46.32°N 0.47°W

Niort
- Arrondissement
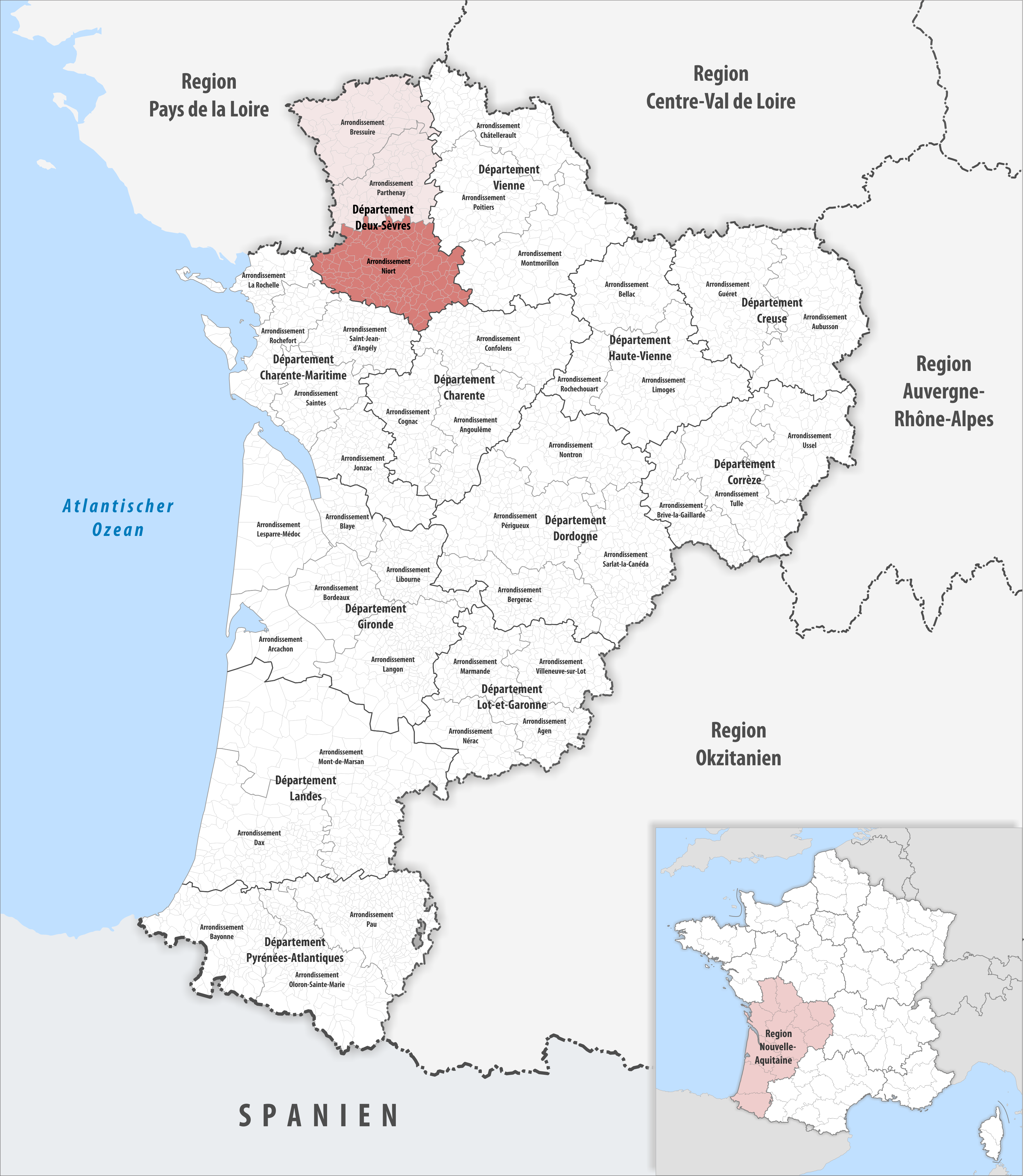
- Location within the region Nouvelle-Aquitaine
- Country: France
- Region: Nouvelle-Aquitaine
- Department: Deux-Sèvres
- No. of communes: {{{nbcomm}}}
- Area: 2,445.1 km^{2} (944.1 sq mi)
- Population (2023): 200,463
  - Density: 81.986/km^{2} (212.34/sq mi)
- INSEE code: 792

The Arrondissement of Niort is an arrondissement of France in the Deux-Sèvres department in the Nouvelle-Aquitaine region. It has 117 communes. Its population is 199,565 (2021), and its area is 2,445.1 km^{2} (944.1 sq mi).

== Composition ==
The communes of the arrondissement of Niort, and their INSEE codes, are:

1. Aiffres (79003)
2. Aigondigné (79185)
3. Alloinay (79136)
4. Amuré (79009)
5. Arçais (79010)
6. Asnières-en-Poitou (79015)
7. Aubigné (79018)
8. Augé (79020)
9. Avon (79023)
10. Azay-le-Brûlé (79024)
11. Beaussais-Vitré (79030)
12. Beauvoir-sur-Niort (79031)
13. Bessines (79034)
14. Bougon (79042)
15. Le Bourdet (79046)
16. Brieuil-sur-Chizé (79055)
17. Brioux-sur-Boutonne (79057)
18. Brûlain (79058)
19. Celles-sur-Belle (79061)
20. La Chapelle-Pouilloux (79074)
21. Chauray (79081)
22. Chef-Boutonne (79083)
23. Chenay (79084)
24. Chérigné (79085)
25. Cherveux (79086)
26. Chey (79087)
27. Chizé (79090)
28. Clussais-la-Pommeraie (79095)
29. Coulon (79100)
30. Couture-d'Argenson (79106)
31. La Crèche (79048)
32. Échiré (79109)
33. Ensigné (79111)
34. Épannes (79112)
35. Exireuil (79114)
36. Exoudun (79115)
37. Fontenille-Saint-Martin-d'Entraigues (79122)
38. Fontivillié (79064)
39. Fors (79125)
40. Les Fosses (79126)
41. La Foye-Monjault (79127)
42. François (79128)
43. Fressines (79129)
44. Frontenay-Rohan-Rohan (79130)
45. Germond-Rouvre (79133)
46. Granzay-Gript (79137)
47. Juillé (79142)
48. Juscorps (79144)
49. Lezay (79148)
50. Limalonges (79150)
51. Lorigné (79152)
52. Loubigné (79153)
53. Loubillé (79154)
54. Luché-sur-Brioux (79158)
55. Lusseray (79160)
56. Magné (79162)
57. Mairé-Levescault (79163)
58. Maisonnay (79164)
59. Marcillé (79251)
60. Marigny (79166)
61. Mauzé-sur-le-Mignon (79170)
62. Melle (79174)
63. Melleran (79175)
64. Messé (79177)
65. La Mothe-Saint-Héray (79184)
66. Nanteuil (79189)
67. Niort (79191)
68. Paizay-le-Chapt (79198)
69. Pamproux (79201)
70. Périgné (79204)
71. Plaine-d'Argenson (79078)
72. Prahecq (79216)
73. Prailles-La Couarde (79217)
74. Prin-Deyrançon (79220)
75. La Rochénard (79229)
76. Rom (79230)
77. Romans (79231)
78. Saint-Coutant (79243)
79. Sainte-Eanne (79246)
80. Sainte-Néomaye (79283)
81. Sainte-Soline (79297)
82. Saint-Gelais (79249)
83. Saint-Georges-de-Rex (79254)
84. Saint-Hilaire-la-Palud (79257)
85. Saint-Maixent-l'École (79270)
86. Saint-Martin-de-Bernegoue (79273)
87. Saint-Martin-de-Saint-Maixent (79276)
88. Saint-Maxire (79281)
89. Saint-Rémy (79293)
90. Saint-Romans-des-Champs (79294)
91. Saint-Romans-lès-Melle (79295)
92. Saint-Symphorien (79298)
93. Saint-Vincent-la-Châtre (79301)
94. Saivres (79302)
95. Salles (79303)
96. Sansais (79304)
97. Sauzé-entre-Bois (79307)
98. Sciecq (79308)
99. Secondigné-sur-Belle (79310)
100. Séligné (79312)
101. Sepvret (79313)
102. Soudan (79316)
103. Souvigné (79319)
104. Valdelaume (79140)
105. Val-du-Mignon (79334)
106. Vallans (79335)
107. Vançais (79336)
108. Le Vanneau-Irleau (79337)
109. Vanzay (79338)
110. Vernoux-sur-Boutonne (79343)
111. Le Vert (79346)
112. Villefollet (79348)
113. Villemain (79349)
114. Villiers-en-Bois (79350)
115. Villiers-en-Plaine (79351)
116. Villiers-sur-Chizé (79352)
117. Vouillé (79355)

== History ==
The arrondissement of Niort was created in 1800. At the January 2018 reorganisation of the arrondissements of Deux-Sèvres, it lost 21 communes to the arrondissement of Parthenay.

As a result of the reorganisation of the cantons of France which came into effect in 2015, the borders of the cantons are no longer related to the borders of the arrondissements. The cantons of the arrondissement of Niort were, as of January 2015:

1. Beauvoir-sur-Niort
2. Brioux-sur-Boutonne
3. Celles-sur-Belle
4. Champdeniers-Saint-Denis
5. Chef-Boutonne
6. Coulonges-sur-l'Autize
7. Frontenay-Rohan-Rohan
8. Lezay
9. Mauzé-sur-le-Mignon
10. Melle
11. La Mothe-Saint-Héray
12. Niort-Est
13. Niort-Nord
14. Niort-Ouest
15. Prahecq
16. Saint-Maixent-l'École-1
17. Saint-Maixent-l'École-2
18. Sauzé-Vaussais
