= Canton of Mignon-et-Boutonne =

Coordinates: 46.20°N 0.67°W

The canton of Mignon-et-Boutonne is an administrative division of the Deux-Sèvres department, western France. It was created at the French canton reorganisation which came into effect in March 2015. Its seat is in Mauzé-sur-le-Mignon.

It consists of the following communes:

1. Asnières-en-Poitou
2. Beauvoir-sur-Niort
3. Le Bourdet
4. Brieuil-sur-Chizé
5. Brioux-sur-Boutonne
6. Chérigné
7. Chizé
8. Ensigné
9. Les Fosses
10. La Foye-Monjault
11. Juillé
12. Luché-sur-Brioux
13. Lusseray
14. Marigny
15. Mauzé-sur-le-Mignon
16. Paizay-le-Chapt
17. Périgné
18. Plaine-d'Argenson
19. Prin-Deyrançon
20. La Rochénard
21. Saint-Georges-de-Rex
22. Saint-Hilaire-la-Palud
23. Secondigné-sur-Belle
24. Séligné
25. Val-du-Mignon
26. Vernoux-sur-Boutonne
27. Le Vert
28. Villefollet
29. Villiers-en-Bois
30. Villiers-sur-Chizé
