= Magne =

Magne may refer to:

- Magne (given name), origin of and people with the given name
- Magne (surname), origin of and people with the surname
- HSwMS Magne, several ships of the Swedish Navy
- Magne Charge, an inductive charging system
- Magne (My Hero Academia), a character in the manga series My Hero Academia

== See also ==
- MagneRide, a magneto rheological suspension system
- Magne Robo Gakeen, an anime series
- Magné
