= Magné =

Magné may refer to:

- Magné, Deux-Sèvres, a commune in the Deux-Sèvres department, France
- Magné, Vienne, a commune in the Vienne department, France
- Magné (surname), origin of and people with the surname

== See also ==
- Magne
