= Deux-Sèvres's 1st constituency =

Constituency of the National Assembly of France

1st constituency of Deux-Sèvres
- inline Constituency of the National Assembly of France
- Deputy: Bastien Marchive; PRV
- Department: Deux-Sèvres
- Cantons: Niort-1, Niort-2, Niort-3, La Plaine Niortaise, Autize-Égray, West part of the Canton of La Gâtine, North part of the Canton of Frontenay-Rohan-Rohan
- Registered voters: 90,237

The 1st constituency of Deux-Sèvres is a French legislative constituency in the Deux-Sèvres département.

== Deputies ==
Election	Member	Party
1958	Marie-Magdeleine Aymé de La Chevrelière	MRP
1962	Marie-Magdeleine Aymé de La Chevrelière	CD
1967	Marie-Magdeleine Aymé de La Chevrelière	UDR
1968	Marie-Magdeleine Aymé de La Chevrelière	UDR
1973	René Gaillard	PS
1978	René Gaillard	PS
1981	René Gaillard	PS
1985	Michel Guyton	PS
1986	Proportional representation - no election by constituency	
1988	André Clert	PS
1993	Jacques Brossard	UDF
1997	Geneviève Gaillard	PS
2002	Geneviève Gaillard	PS
2007	Geneviève Gaillard	PS
2012	Geneviève Gaillard	PS
2017	Guillaume Chiche	LREM
2020	Guillaume Chiche	LND
2022	Bastien Marchive	PRV

== Election results ==
=== 2024 ===
Legislative Election 2024: Deux-Sèvres's 1st constituency
Party	Candidate	Votes	%	±%
PS (NFP)	Nathalie Lanzi	20,571	32.79	N/A
DVG	Marc René Gaillard	0	0.00	N/A
REC	Virginie Juliard	773	1.23	−1.73
LO	Danielle Vauzelle	698	1.11	0
RN	Dorothée Champeau	15,447	24.62	+11.72
RE (Ensemble)	Bastien Marchive	25,247	40.24	+10.04
Turnout		62,736	96.93	+45.82
Registered electors		91,748		
2nd round result
RE	Bastien Marchive	26,655	42.37	−9.62
PS	Nathalie Lanzi	20,526	32.63	N/A
RN	Dorothée Champeau	15,732	25.01	N/A
Turnout		62,913	97.62	+46.73
Registered electors		91,752		
RE hold		Swing		

=== 2022 ===
Legislative Election 2022: Deux-Sèvres's 1st constituency
Party	Candidate	Votes	%	±%
PRV (Ensemble)	Bastien Marchive	13,741	30.20	-10.39
LFI (NUPÉS)	François Charron	12,938	28.43	+3.84
DVE	Guillaume Chiche	7,884	17.33	N/A
RN	Dorothée Champeau	5,869	12.90	+6.03
UDI (UDC)	Catherine Ganivet	1,704	3.74	−7.63
DIV	Geneviève Masson	1,517	3.33	N/A
REC	Matylde Brethenoux	1,345	2.96	N/A
LO	Danielle Vauzelle	505	1.11	+0.33
Turnout		45,503	51.11	+1.01
2nd round result
PRV (Ensemble)	Bastien Marchive	22,511	51.99	-8.43
LFI (NUPÉS)	François Charron	20,788	48.01	+8.43
Turnout		43,299	50.89	+8.93
PRV gain from LREM				

=== 2017 ===
Legislative Election 2012: Deux-Sèvres's 1st constituency
Party	Candidate	Votes	%	±%
LREM	Guillaume Chiche	18,350	40.59	
LFI	Nathalie Seguin	7,164	15.85	
UDI	Marc Thebault	5,140	11.37	
PS	Elodie Truong	3,952	8.74	
DVD	Coralie Denoues	3,279	7.25	
FN	Martine Gendry	3,106	6.87	
DVG	Alain Piveteau	2,167	4.79	
Others	N/A	2,052		
Turnout		45,210	50.10	
2nd round result
LREM	Guillaume Chiche	22,878	60.42	
LFI	Nathalie Seguin	14,987	39.58	
Turnout		37,865	41.96	
LREM gain from PS				

=== 2012 ===
Legislative Election 2012: Deux-Sèvres's 1st constituency
Party	Candidate	Votes	%	±%
PS	Geneviève Gaillard	21,446	42.40	
PRV	Jérôme Baloge	15,494	30.64	
PG	Nathalie Seguin	4,747	9.39	
FN	Lucie Chaumeron	3,437	6.80	
EELV	Virginie Leonard	2,926	5.79	
MoDem	Jean-Michel Prieur	1,682	3.33	
Others	N/A	844		
Turnout		50,576	57.18	
2nd round result
PS	Geneviève Gaillard	26,707	56.20	
PRV	Jérôme Baloge	20,814	43.80	
Turnout		47,521	53.74	
PS hold				

=== 2007 ===
Legislative Election 2007: Deux-Sèvres's 1st constituency
Party	Candidate	Votes	%	±%
PS	Geneviève Gaillard	18,699	48.59	
UMP	Frédéric Rouille	11,656	30.29	
MoDem	Febien Waechter	2,327	6.05	
LV	Serge Morin	1,629	4.23	
PCF	Frédéric Giraud	1,243	3.23	
MPF	France Barraud	842	2.19	
Others	N/A	2,087		
Turnout		39,212	60.94	
2nd round result
PS	Geneviève Gaillard	23,871	65.24	
UMP	Frédéric Rouille	12,717	34.76	
Turnout		37,585	58.43	
PS hold				

=== 2002 ===
Legislative Election 2002: Deux-Sèvres's 1st constituency
Party	Candidate	Votes	%	±%
PS	Geneviève Gaillard	15,905	39.59	
UMP	Jacques Brossard	12,642	31.47	
UMP	Jacqueline Lefebvre	4,913	12.23	
FN	Jean-Romée Charbonneau	1,623	4.04	
LV	Nicolle Gravat	1,149	2.86	
PS	Rodolphe Challet	832	2.07	
Others	N/A	3,111		
Turnout		40,872	68.00	
2nd round result
PS	Geneviève Gaillard	19,996	52.11	
UMP	Jacques Brossard	18,373	47.89	
Turnout		39,145	65.13	
PS hold				

=== 1997 ===
Legislative Election 1997: Deux-Sèvres's 1st constituency
Party	Candidate	Votes	%	±%
PS	Geneviève Gaillard	14,446	37.72	
UDF	Jacques Brossard	13,913	36.33	
LV	Noël Boisanger	2,854	7.45	
PCF	Gérard Nebas	2,662	6.95	
FN	Jean-Romée Charbonneau	2,483	6.48	
DVD	Véronique Piart	1,037	2.71	
MRC	Christian Turpault	904	2.36	
Turnout		40,336	67.32	
2nd round result
PS	Geneviève Gaillard	23,172	56.04	
UDF	Jacques Brossard	18,178	43.96	
Turnout		43,025	71.81	
PS gain from UDF				

== Sources ==
- "Résultats électoraux officiels en France" (in French). 2017.
- "Résultats électoraux officiels en France" (in French). 2012.
- "Résultats électoraux officiels en France" (in French). 2007.
- "Résultats électoraux officiels en France" (in French). 2002.
