= Guillaume Chiche =

French politician (born 1986)

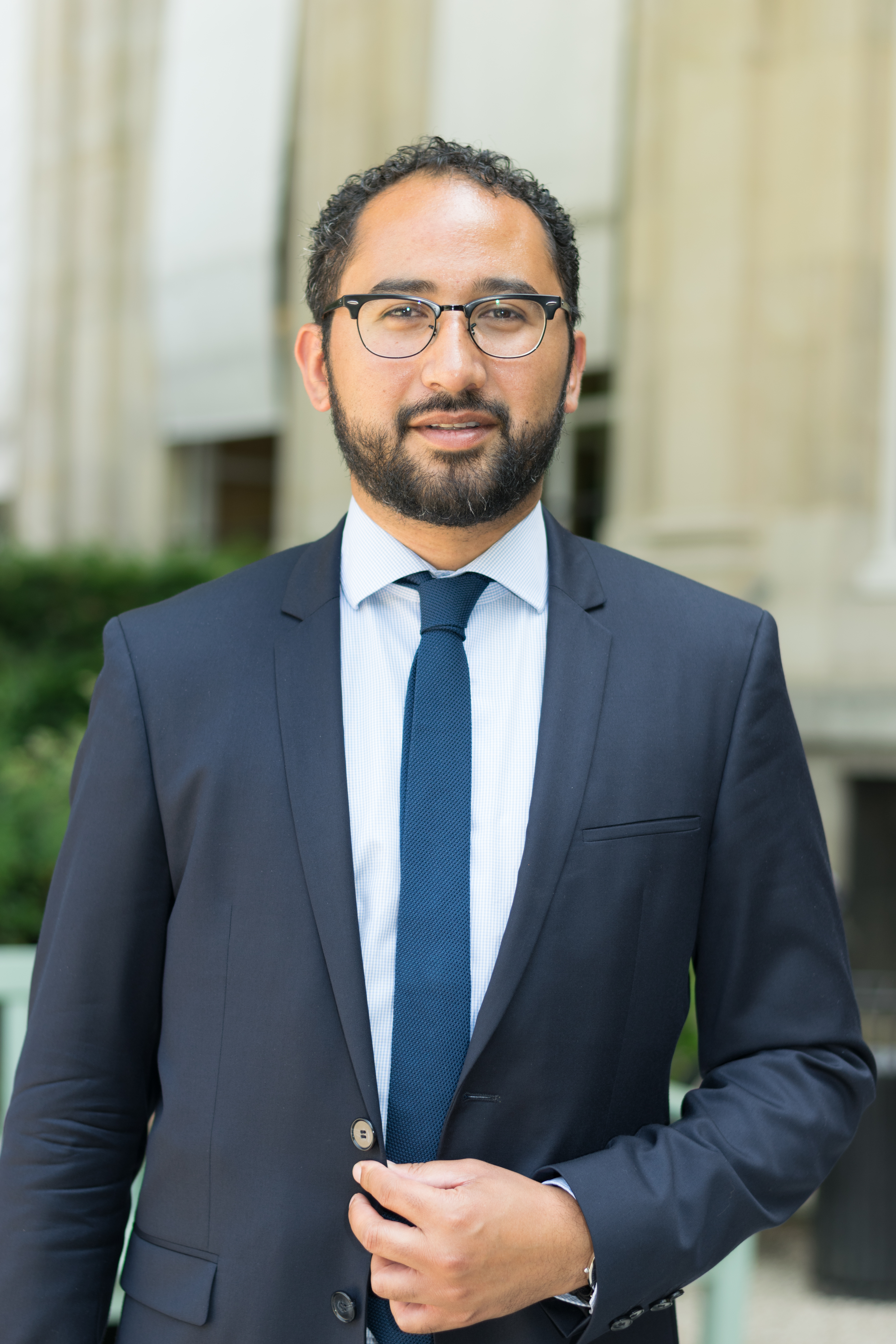
- Chiche in 2017

Member of the National Assembly for Deux-Sèvres's 1st constituency
- In office 21 June 2017 – 22 June 2022
- Preceded by: Geneviève Gaillard
- Succeeded by: Bastien Marchive

Personal details
- Born: 30 March 1986 (age 40) Niort, France
- Party: The New Democrats (since 2020)
- Other political affiliations: La République En Marche! (2017—2020), Ecology Democracy Solidarity (2020)
- Education: University of Poitiers; Paris Descartes University

Guillaume Chiche (born 30 March 1986) is a French politician who was elected to the French National Assembly on 18 June 2017, representing the department of Deux-Sèvres. He was considered a close ally of President Emmanuel Macron. He was elected as a member of La République En Marche!, but left the party and in May 2020, he was one of the 17 initial members who formed the short-lived Ecology Democracy Solidarity group. Since 2020, he is a member of The New Democrats.

== Political career ==
In parliament, Chiche serves as member of the Committee on Social Affairs. In addition to his committee assignments, he is part of the parliamentary friendship groups with Argentina and Brazil.

In January 2019, Chiche joined the LREM executive board. In that capacity, he shares responsibility with Laurent Saint-Martin for the party's policy planning.

== Political positions ==
In a 2018 parliamentary report, Chiche proposed the abolition of income splitting for the purposes of assessing personal income tax.

In 2019, Chiche led (with Aurore Bergé) a group of LREM members who advocated for broad access to assisted reproductive technology for all women (Lesbian or single) (ART). Unlike Bergé, he supported the authorization of post-mortem ART, a motion which was rejected by a parliamentary majority.

In July 2019, Chiche decided not to align with his parliamentary group's majority and became one of 52 LREM members who abstained from a vote on the French ratification of the European Union’s Comprehensive Economic and Trade Agreement (CETA) with Canada.

== See also ==
- 2017 French legislative election
