= Louis Perceau =

French writer and poet (1883–1942)

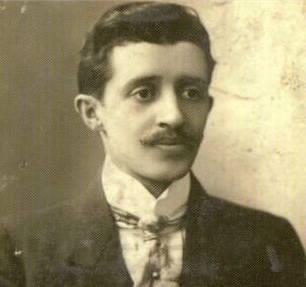
- Born: 22 September 1883; Coulon
- Died: 20 April 1942 (aged 58); Paris
- Occupation: Bibliographer

Louis Perceau (22 September 1883 – 20 April 1942) was a 20th-century French polygraph. He used several pseudonyms including Helpey bibliographe poitevin, Dr. Ludovico Hernandez, Alexandre de Vérineau, Un vieux journaliste, Radeville et Deschamps, marquis Boniface de Richequeue, sometimes jointly with Fernand Fleuret.

== Career ==
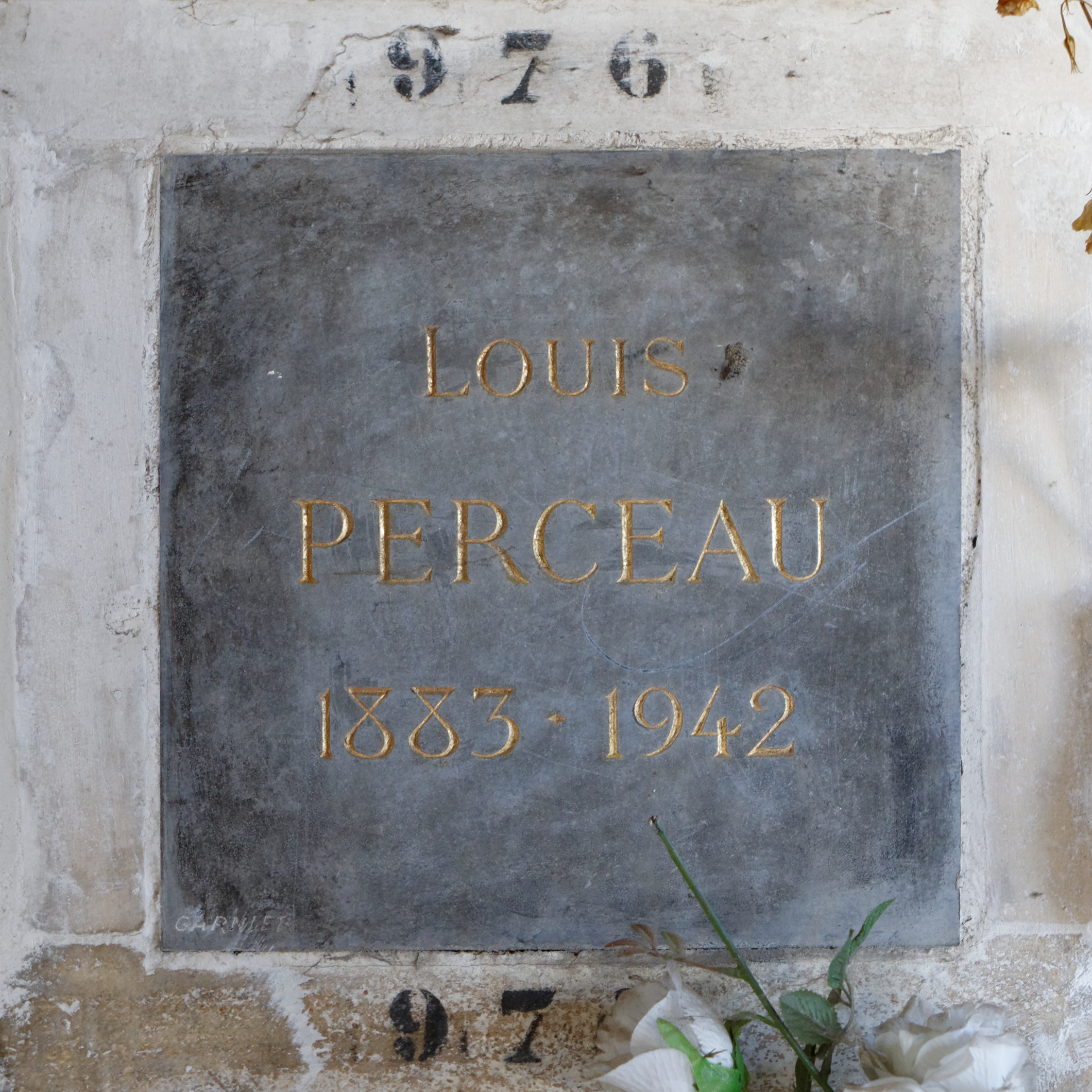
Perceau's grave at Père Lachaise Cemetery (87th division).

First a tailor, Louis Perceau was in Paris from 1901. He became editor at La Guerre sociale and La Vie socialiste and his socialist activism earned him the friendship of Jean Jaurès, Gustave Hervé and Albert Thomas, but also an arrest and imprisonment for six months (1906). He then actively participated in reforming the Socialist Party (France) in 1920.

Perceau was also passionate about satirical poetry, erotic writings and literature scholarly research. His two most famous works reflect his passions: Enfer de la Bibliothèque nationale with Guillaume Apollinaire and Fernand Fleuret published in 1913; La Redoute des contrepèteries published in 1934.

He used facetious pseudonyms, sometimes shared with Fleuret, because he was stuck since 1906 by the police and to cover his licentious poetic publications and erotic books presentations from the corpus of the Grand Siecle or Lumières. He secretly collaborated as editorial advisor with Maurice Duflou and probably Rene Bonnel.

Early 1942, he joined the French Resistance and began a lawsuit against the anti-Semitic journal Je suis partout but died soon after.

His ashes are kept in the Crématorium-columbarium du Père-Lachaise (case n°976).

== Main works ==
- 1913: With Guillaume Apollinaire and Fernand Fleuret: L'Enfer de la Bibliothèque nationale, Mercure de France, Paris, [reprint in 1919]
- 1920: With Fernand Fleuret: Les Œuvres satyriques du sieur de Sigogne : première édition complète, d'après les recueils et manuscrits satyriques, avec un discours préliminaire, des variantes et des notes, Paris, Bibliothèque des curieux.
- 1921: Ludovico Hernandez [Perceau and Fleuret] : Le Procès inquisitorial de Gilles de Rais (Barbe-Bleue), maréchal de France, avec un essai de réhabilitation, Paris, Bibliothèque des curieux, 210 p., Read online.
- 1922: With Fernand Fleuret : Les Satires françaises du XVIe, recueillies et publiées, avec une préface, des notices et un glossaire, Paris, Garnier frères - including poems by Jean de Boyssières
- 1927: [Fernand Fleuret et Louis Perceau] : Contes saugrenus, Pierre Sylvain Maréchal, notice et bibliographie par le chevalier de Percefleur, Paris, Bibliothèque des Curieux.
- 1928: Helpey [L. Perceau] : Le Cabinet secret du Parnasse, recueil de poésies libres, rares ou peu connues pour servir de supplément aux œuvres dites complètes des poètes français, Au Cabinet du livre.
- 1930: Helpey [L. Perceau] : Bibliographie du roman érotique au XIX : donnant une description complète de tous les romans, nouvelles et autres ouvrages en prose, publiés sous le manteau, en français de 1800 à nos jours, et de toutes leurs réimpressions, G. Fourdrinier.
- 1933: Helpey [L. Perceau] : Vie anecdotique de Jean de La Fontaine, G. Briffaut.
- 1934: Louis Perceau (1934). La Redoute des contrepèteries. Le coffret du bibliophile illustré. G. Briffaut.
- 1941: With Geneviève Thibault, Bibliographie des poésies de Ronsard mis en musique au XVIe, Paris, Société française de musicologie - notice on Antoine de Bertrand
- 1967: [posthumous] Contes de la Pigouille, éditions du Marais - illustrated by Pierre Bugeant, this collection contains 20 tales written in 1916-1920
- undated: Histoires raides pour l'instruction des jeunes filles, illustrated

== Studies ==
- Vincent Labaume : Louis Perceau, le polygraphe, Jean-Pierre Faur publisher, 2005 (ISBN 978-2909882406) with a complete bibliography of his works established by Pierre-Alexandre Soueix.

== See also ==
- Spoonerism
- Alcide Bonneau
