= Château du Coudray-Salbart =

Castle in Nouvelle-Aquitaine, France

Coordinates: 46°24′25″N 0°25′35″W

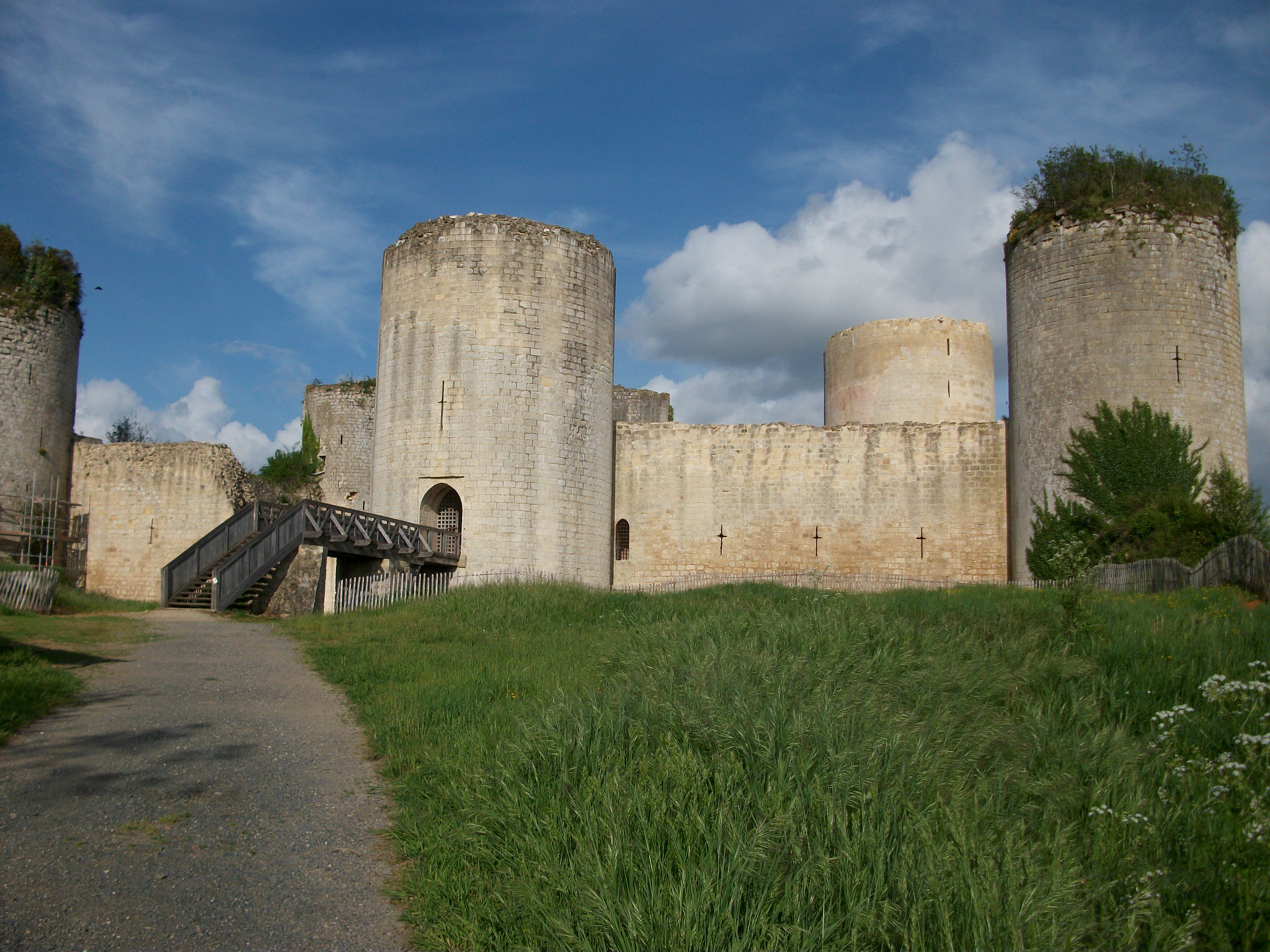
Ruins of Coudray-Salbart Castle

The Château du Coudray-Salbart is a ruined medieval castle in Échiré, in the Deux-Sèvres department of western France. Built and expanded during the early 13th centuries by the lords of Parthenay, with financial support from the Plantagenet kings of England, it occupies a strategic position overlooking the Sèvre Niortaise. The castle is notable for the exceptional preservation of its medieval defensive architecture, including six towers, two almond-shaped towers and a vaulted internal gallery within the curtain walls.

The ruins have been protected as a Monument historique since 1952 and 1954. The castle has been owned by the Communauté d'agglomération du Niortais since 2000 and is managed for cultural and tourist purposes by the Association des Amis du Château du Coudray-Salbart.

== History ==
The Château du Coudray-Salbart came under the control of the lords of Parthenay-Larchevêque in the 12th century. Its construction lasted nearly half a century during the first half of the 13th century, transforming an initial modest castle into the vast, subrectangular complex visible today. This work was partly financed by the English kings John Lackland and later Henry III, within the broader context of the rivalries between the Capetians and the Plantagenets for control of Poitou.

The fortress played a key strategic role in the conflicts of the early 13th century. Following John Lackland’s military campaigns in 1206 and again in 1214—marked by the failure at La Roche-aux-Moines and the defeat at Bouvines—the region remained unstable. Upon John Lackland’s death in 1216, the suspension of the subsidies promised by Henry III sparked a conflict between the king and the lords of Poitou, including the lords of Parthenay. In the early 1220s, the Coudray-Salbart thus became a base of operations used to exert pressure on Niort, which had remained loyal to the English crown.

The decline of Plantagenet power accelerated with the capture of Niort and La Rochelle by Louis VIII in 1224, and was definitively sealed during the Saintonge War (1242-1243), when the defeat of Henry III and the Lusignans at the Battle of Saintes led Guillaume V of Parthenay to rally to the Capetian side. The castle then gradually lost its strategic importance as the influence of the Plantagenets waned in Poitou.

== Architecture ==
The Château du Coudray-Salbart follows a near-quadrangular plan, built around an upper bailey enclosed by curtain walls and preceded by a lower ward. Perched on a promontory above the Sèvre Niortaise, the surviving structures, remarkably well preserved, reflect several successive building phases carried out during the first half of the 13th century.

Six towers protect the upper bailey: four stand at the corners of the enclosure — the Bois-Berthier Tower, the Mill Tower, the Double Tower, and the Great Tower — while two more, the Saint-Michel Tower and the Portal Tower, rise midway along the curtain walls. The Double Tower and Great Tower are distinguished by their almond shape, a remarkable design that features an outward-projecting angle and enhances the defense of the curtain walls. Each of the six towers features one or two vaulted rooms that remain visible today. A circular corridor, built into the thickness of the curtain walls links the towers together and allows for circulation from one to the next.

A ditch encircles the entire fortification, adding to the site's natural defensive advantages. On the western side, the lower bailey was once enclosed by walls that have largely disappeared today, with only the remains of a barbican marking its former entrance. A survey from 1460 provides valuable information about elements that no longer exist, notably certain access points and buildings in both courtyards.

== See also ==
- List of castles in France
- Monument historique
- Échiré
- Parthenay
- Plantagenet
- Saintonge War
- Anglo-French War (1213-1214)
- Donjon de Niort
