= Vouillé, Deux-Sèvres =

Vouillé
- Commune
- Location of Vouillé
- Location within France Location within Nouvelle-Aquitaine
- Coordinates: 46°19′02″N 0°21′39″W
- Country: France
- Region: Nouvelle-Aquitaine
- Department: Deux-Sèvres
- Arrondissement: Niort
- Canton: La Plaine Niortaise
- Intercommunality: Niortais

Government
  - Mayor (2020–2026): Franck Portz
- Area^{1}: 22.30 km^{2} (8.61 sq mi)
- Elevation: 69 m (226 ft)
- Highest elevation: 93 m (305 ft)
- Lowest elevation: 39 m (128 ft)
- Population (2023): 3,566
  - Density: 159.9/km^{2} (414.2/sq mi)
- Time zone: UTC+01:00 (CET)
  - Summer (DST): UTC+02:00 (CEST)
- INSEE/Postal code: 79355 /79230
- ^{1} French Land Register data, which excludes lakes, ponds, glaciers > 1 km^{2} (0.386 sq mi or 247 acres) and river estuaries.

Vouillé (French pronunciation: [vuje]) is a commune in the Deux-Sèvres department in western France. It sits about ten kilometers east from Niort on the banks of the Lambon, where that small river empties into the Sèvre Niortaise.

== Population ==
Historical population
Year	Pop.	±% p.a.
1968	1,285	—
1975	1,610	+3.27%
1982	2,130	+4.08%
1990	2,431	+1.67%
1999	2,660	+1.01%
2007	3,025	+1.62%
2012	3,262	+1.52%
2017	3,292	+0.18%
2023	3,566	+1.34%
Source: INSEE

== See also ==
- Communes of the Deux-Sèvres department
