= Frontenay-Rohan-Rohan =

Commune in western France

- Commune
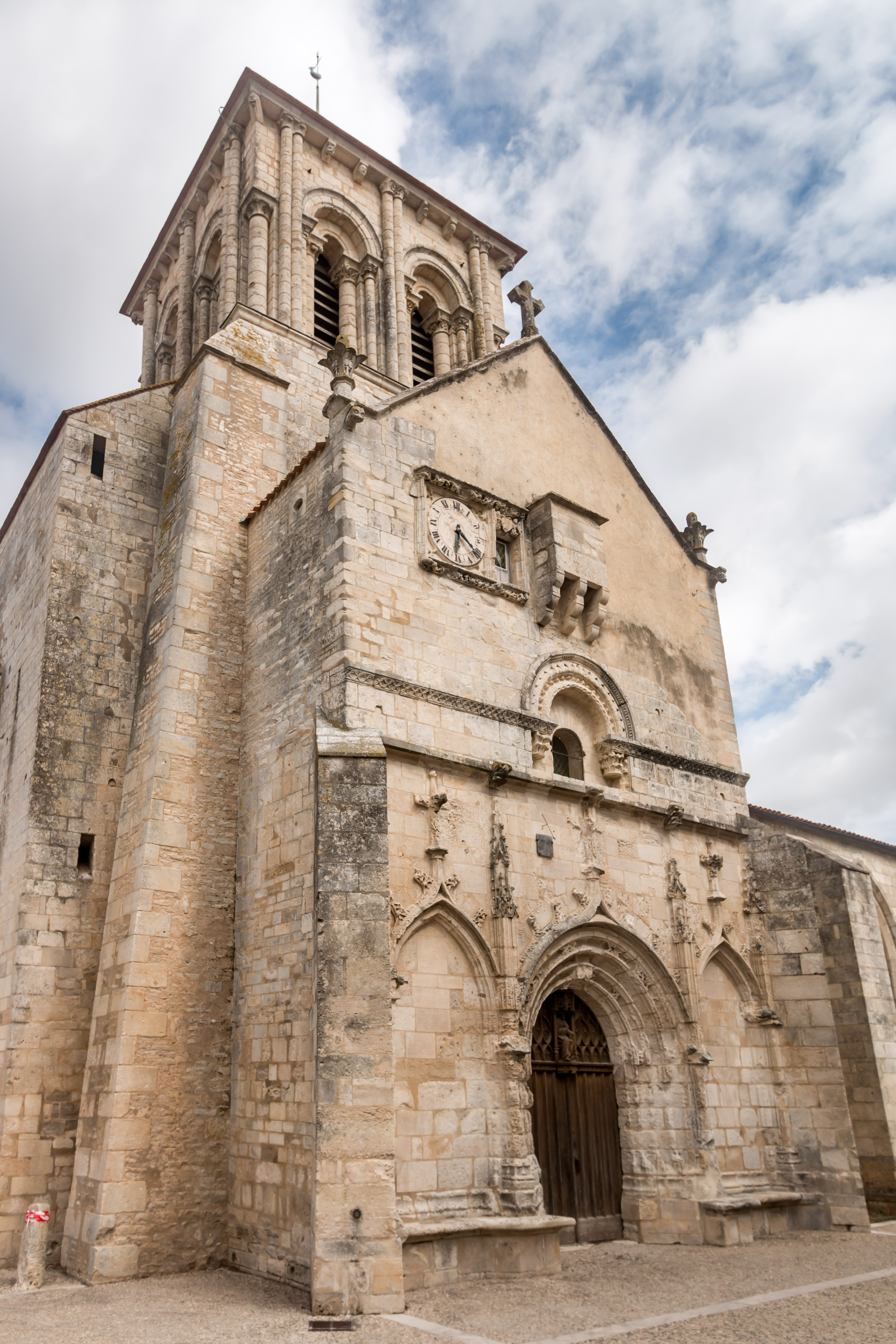
- St. Peter's church

- Coat of arms
- Location of Frontenay-Rohan-Rohan
- Location within France Location within Nouvelle-Aquitaine
- Coordinates: 46°15′20″N 0°32′19″W
- Country: France
- Region: Nouvelle-Aquitaine
- Department: Deux-Sèvres
- Arrondissement: Niort
- Canton: Frontenay-Rohan-Rohan
- Intercommunality: CA Niortais

Government
  - Mayor (2020–2026): Olivier Poiraud
- Area^{1}: 33.79 km^{2} (13.05 sq mi)
- Elevation: 18 m (59 ft)
- Highest elevation: 47 m (154 ft)
- Lowest elevation: 2 m (6.6 ft)
- Population (2023): 2,967
  - Density: 87.81/km^{2} (227.4/sq mi)
- Time zone: UTC+01:00 (CET)
  - Summer (DST): UTC+02:00 (CEST)
- INSEE/Postal code: 79130 /79270
- ^{1} French Land Register data, which excludes lakes, ponds, glaciers > 1 km^{2} (0.386 sq mi or 247 acres) and river estuaries.

Frontenay-Rohan-Rohan (French pronunciation: [fʁɔ̃tnɛ ʁɔɑ̃ ʁɔɑ̃]) is a commune in the Deux-Sèvres department, Nouvelle-Aquitaine region, western France.

It is located 10 km south of Niort on the route to La Rochelle.

== Population ==
Historical population
Year	Pop.	±% p.a.
1968	1,813	—
1975	2,097	+2.10%
1982	2,450	+2.25%
1990	2,571	+0.60%
1999	2,653	+0.35%
2007	2,952	+1.34%
2012	2,954	+0.01%
2017	2,862	−0.63%
2023	2,967	+0.60%
Source: INSEE

== See also ==
- Communes of the Deux-Sèvres department
