= Granzay-Gript =

- Commune
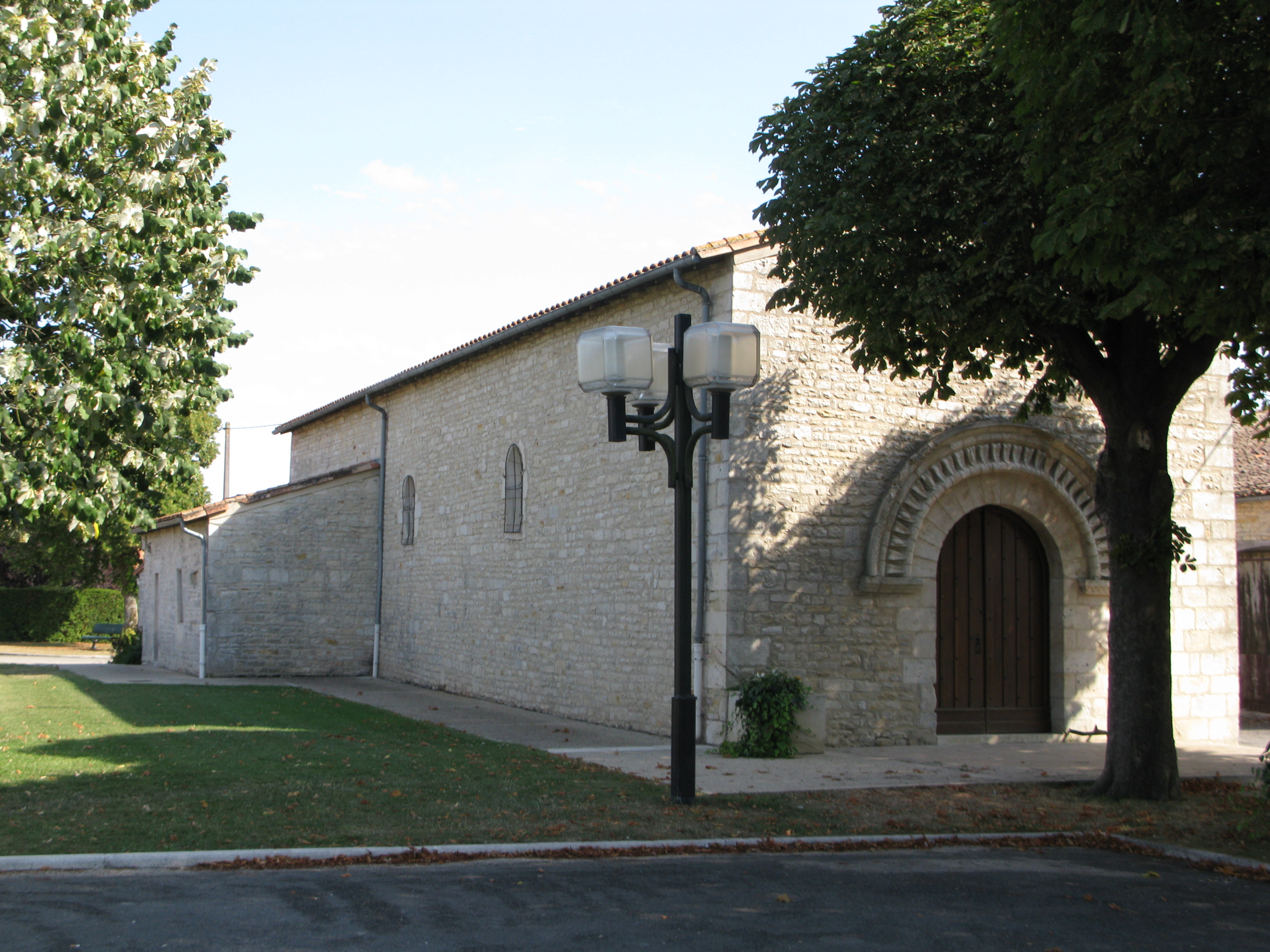
- The church in Granzay
- Location of Granzay-Gript
- Location within France Location within Nouvelle-Aquitaine
- Coordinates: 46°13′23″N 0°29′27″W
- Country: France
- Region: Nouvelle-Aquitaine
- Department: Deux-Sèvres
- Arrondissement: Niort
- Canton: Frontenay-Rohan-Rohan
- Intercommunality: CA Niortais

Government
  - Mayor (2020–2026): Florent Jarriault
- Area^{1}: 21.55 km^{2} (8.32 sq mi)
- Elevation: 31 m (102 ft)
- Highest elevation: 63 m (207 ft)
- Lowest elevation: 24 m (79 ft)
- Population (2023): 933
  - Density: 43.3/km^{2} (112/sq mi)
- Time zone: UTC+01:00 (CET)
  - Summer (DST): UTC+02:00 (CEST)
- INSEE/Postal code: 79137 /79360
- ^{1} French Land Register data, which excludes lakes, ponds, glaciers > 1 km^{2} (0.386 sq mi or 247 acres) and river estuaries.

Granzay-Gript is a commune in the Deux-Sèvres department in western France.

== See also ==
- Communes of the Deux-Sèvres department
