= Bessines =

- Commune
- Location of Bessines
- Location within France Location within Nouvelle-Aquitaine
- Coordinates: 46°18′10″N 0°30′54″W
- Country: France
- Region: Nouvelle-Aquitaine
- Department: Deux-Sèvres
- Arrondissement: Niort
- Canton: Frontenay-Rohan-Rohan
- Intercommunality: CA Niortais

Government
  - Mayor (2021–2026): Christophe Guinot
- Area^{1}: 11.41 km^{2} (4.41 sq mi)
- Elevation: 9 m (30 ft)
- Highest elevation: 30 m (98 ft)
- Lowest elevation: 2 m (6.6 ft)
- Population (2023): 1,903
  - Density: 166.8/km^{2} (432.0/sq mi)
- Time zone: UTC+01:00 (CET)
  - Summer (DST): UTC+02:00 (CEST)
- INSEE/Postal code: 79034 /79000
- ^{1} French Land Register data, which excludes lakes, ponds, glaciers > 1 km^{2} (0.386 sq mi or 247 acres) and river estuaries.

Bessines is a commune in the Deux-Sèvres department in the Nouvelle-Aquitaine region in western France.

== See also ==
- Communes of the Deux-Sèvres department
