= Bastien Marchive =

French politician (born 1990)

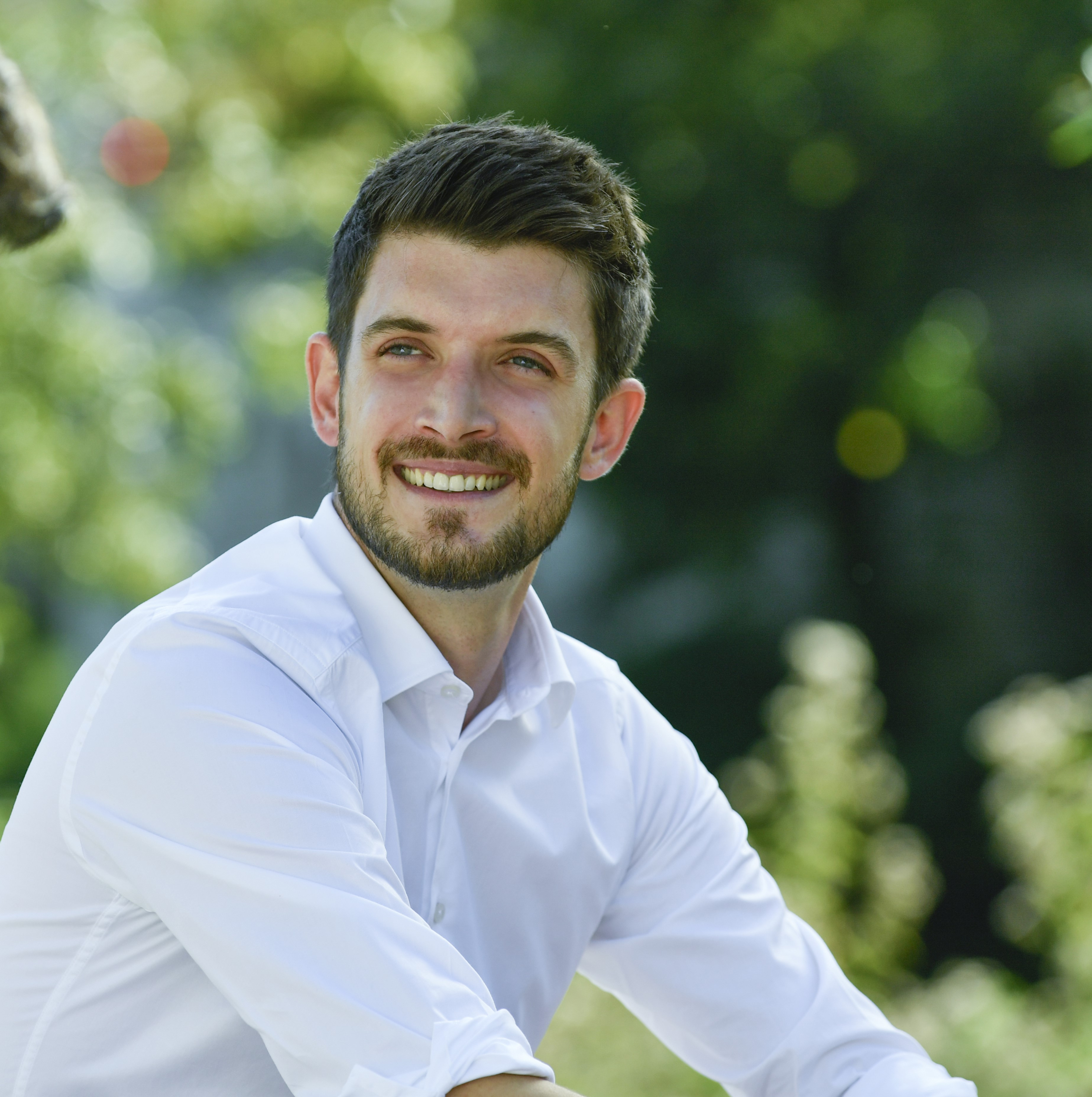
- Bastien Marchive in 2022.

Member of the National Assembly for Deux-Sèvres's 1st constituency
- Incumbent
- Assumed office 22 June 2022
- Preceded by: Guillaume Chiche

Personal details
- Born: 15 July 1990 (age 34); Niort, France
- Political party: Radical Party

Bastien Marchive (born 15 July 1990) is a French politician from the Radical Party who has been Member of Parliament for Deux-Sèvres's 1st constituency since 2022.

== See also ==
- List of deputies of the 16th National Assembly of France
