= Vallans =

- Commune
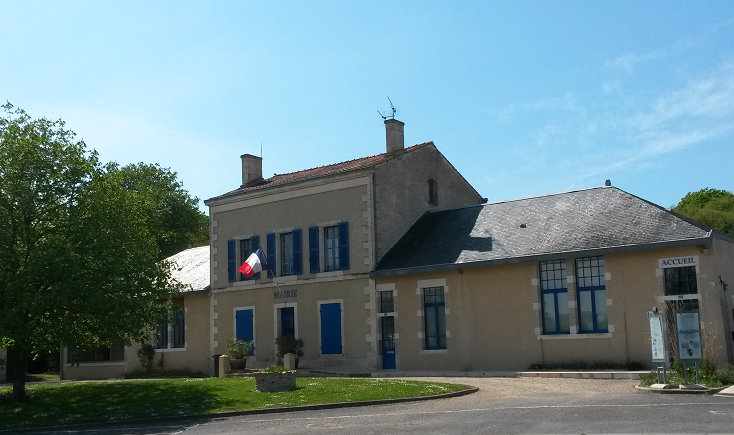
- Town hall
- Location of Vallans
- Location within France Location within Nouvelle-Aquitaine
- Coordinates: 46°12′54″N 0°33′05″W
- Country: France
- Region: Nouvelle-Aquitaine
- Department: Deux-Sèvres
- Arrondissement: Niort
- Canton: Frontenay-Rohan-Rohan
- Intercommunality: CA Niortais

Government
  - Mayor (2020–2026): Cédric Bouchet
- Area^{1}: 9.03 km^{2} (3.49 sq mi)
- Elevation: 35 m (115 ft)
- Highest elevation: 56 m (184 ft)
- Lowest elevation: 17 m (56 ft)
- Population (2023): 840
  - Density: 93/km^{2} (240/sq mi)
- Time zone: UTC+01:00 (CET)
  - Summer (DST): UTC+02:00 (CEST)
- INSEE/Postal code: 79335 /79270
- ^{1} French Land Register data, which excludes lakes, ponds, glaciers > 1 km^{2} (0.386 sq mi or 247 acres) and river estuaries.

Vallans is a commune in the Deux-Sèvres department in western France.

== See also ==
- Communes of the Deux-Sèvres department
