= Saint-Symphorien, Deux-Sèvres =

Saint-Symphorien
- Commune
- Location of Saint-Symphorien
- Location within France Location within Nouvelle-Aquitaine
- Coordinates: 46°15′52″N 0°29′25″W
- Country: France
- Region: Nouvelle-Aquitaine
- Department: Deux-Sèvres
- Arrondissement: Niort
- Canton: Frontenay-Rohan-Rohan
- Intercommunality: CA Niortais

Government
  - Mayor (2020–2026): Fabrice Barreault
- Area^{1}: 19.01 km^{2} (7.34 sq mi)
- Elevation: 16 m (52 ft)
- Highest elevation: 55 m (180 ft)
- Lowest elevation: 5 m (16 ft)
- Population (2023): 1,983
  - Density: 104.3/km^{2} (270.2/sq mi)
- Time zone: UTC+01:00 (CET)
  - Summer (DST): UTC+02:00 (CEST)
- INSEE/Postal code: 79298 /79270
- ^{1} French Land Register data, which excludes lakes, ponds, glaciers > 1 km^{2} (0.386 sq mi or 247 acres) and river estuaries.

Saint-Symphorien (French pronunciation: [sɛ̃ sɛ̃fɔʁjɛ̃]) is a commune in the Deux-Sèvres department in western France.

== See also ==
- Communes of the Deux-Sèvres department
