= Germond-Rouvre =

- Commune
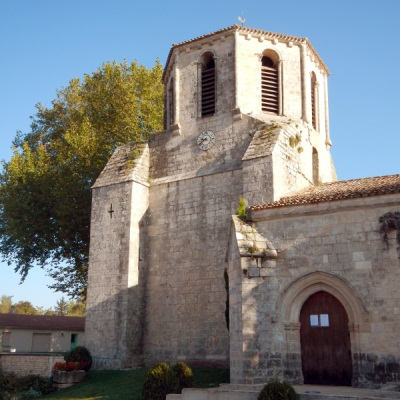
- Church in Germond-Rouvre
- Location of Germond-Rouvre
- Location within France Location within Nouvelle-Aquitaine
- Coordinates: 46°27′22″N 0°25′13″W
- Country: France
- Region: Nouvelle-Aquitaine
- Department: Deux-Sèvres
- Arrondissement: Niort
- Canton: Autize-Égray
- Intercommunality: CA Niortais

Government
  - Mayor (2020–2026): Gérard Époulet
- Area^{1}: 17.88 km^{2} (6.90 sq mi)
- Elevation: 80 m (260 ft)
- Highest elevation: 123 m (404 ft)
- Lowest elevation: 33 m (108 ft)
- Population (2023): 1,167
  - Density: 65.27/km^{2} (169.0/sq mi)
- Time zone: UTC+01:00 (CET)
  - Summer (DST): UTC+02:00 (CEST)
- INSEE/Postal code: 79133 /79220
- ^{1} French Land Register data, which excludes lakes, ponds, glaciers > 1 km^{2} (0.386 sq mi or 247 acres) and river estuaries.

Germond-Rouvre (French pronunciation: [ʒɛʁmɔ̃ ʁuvʁ]) is a commune in the Deux-Sèvres department in the Nouvelle-Aquitaine region in western France.

== See also ==
- Communes of the Deux-Sèvres department
