= List of protected heritage sites in Crisnée =

This table shows an overview of the protected heritage sites in the Walloon town Crisnée. This list is part of Belgium's national heritage.

Object	Year/architect	Town/section	Address	Coordinates	Number^{?}	Image
Church of St. Pierre ^{(nl)} ^{(fr)}		Crisnée		50.722435°N 5.388442°E	64021-CLT-0001-01	Kerk Saint-Pierre: toren, middenschip, rechter zijbeuk, koor met gestoelte van het orgel
Architectural group ^{(nl)} ^{(fr)}		Crisnée		50.723648°N 5.387884°E	64021-CLT-0002-01	Architectonisch ensemble
Horse chestnut tree and border marker ^{(nl)} ^{(fr)}		Crisnée		50.705502°N 5.382597°E	64021-CLT-0003-01	
Tower of the old church ^{(nl)} ^{(fr)}		Crisnée	Odeur	50.705903°N 5.415425°E	64021-CLT-0005-01	Toren van de oude kerk te Odeur

== See also ==
- List of protected heritage sites in Liège (province)
- Crisnée
