= Saint-Gelais =

- Commune
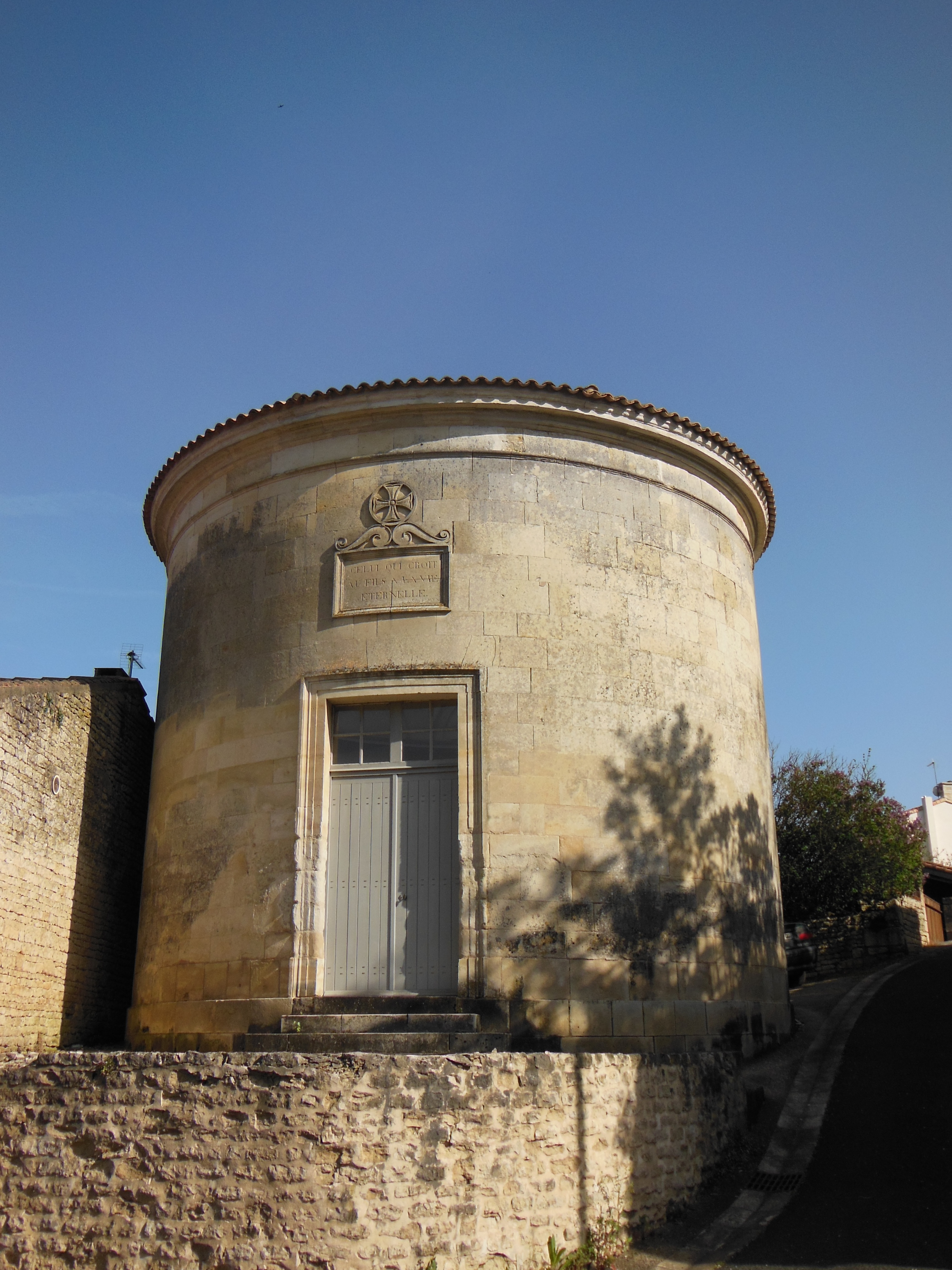
- The Temple of Saint-Gelais

- Coat of arms
- Location of Saint-Gelais
- Location within France Location within Nouvelle-Aquitaine
- Coordinates: 46°23′01″N 0°23′19″W
- Country: France
- Region: Nouvelle-Aquitaine
- Department: Deux-Sèvres
- Arrondissement: Niort
- Canton: La Plaine Niortaise
- Intercommunality: CA Niortais

Government
  - Mayor (2020–2026): Gérard Bobineau
- Area^{1}: 16.40 km^{2} (6.33 sq mi)
- Elevation: 64 m (210 ft)
- Highest elevation: 93 m (305 ft)
- Lowest elevation: 30 m (98 ft)
- Population (2023): 2,220
  - Density: 135/km^{2} (351/sq mi)
- Time zone: UTC+01:00 (CET)
  - Summer (DST): UTC+02:00 (CEST)
- INSEE/Postal code: 79249 /79410
- ^{1} French Land Register data, which excludes lakes, ponds, glaciers > 1 km^{2} (0.386 sq mi or 247 acres) and river estuaries.

Saint-Gelais is a commune in the Deux-Sèvres department in western France.

== Population ==
Historical population
| Year | Pop. | ±% p.a. |
|---|---|---|
| 1968 | 750 | — |
| 1975 | 1,001 | +4.21% |
| 1982 | 1,221 | +2.88% |
| 1990 | 1,400 | +1.72% |
| 1999 | 1,456 | +0.44% |
| 2007 | 1,649 | +1.57% |
| 2012 | 1,856 | +2.39% |
| 2017 | 2,091 | +2.41% |
| 2023 | 2,220 | +1.00% |
Source: INSEE

== See also ==
- Communes of the Deux-Sèvres department
