= André Cramois =

French banker and engineer (1900–1978)

Cramois photographed by Claude Despoisse, c. 1950s–1960s

André Cramois (9 October 1900 – 14 April 1978) was a French agricultural banker and engineer who managed the state-supervised mutual bank Crédit Agricole from 1944 to 1963.

== Life and career ==
Cramois was born in Coulon, Deux-Sèvres, Nouvelle-Aquitaine on 9 October 1900 to a schoolteacher father. He excelled academically, receiving a degree in electrical engineering from the École d'arts et métiers at Aix-en-Provence in 1917 and completing postgraduate study at the École supérieure d'électricité and École libre des sciences politiques.

Despite this background, Cramois began work as a civil servant at the supervisory national clearing bank (l'Office national, later the Caisse National) of Crédit Agricole from age 21. He became the Ministry of Agriculture's inspector-general for local branches of Crédit Agricole, performing audits and spot checks for compliance. Cramois became general auditor in 1939.

In 1944, Cramois succeeded Charles Desigauz as the Director General of the Caisse National. During Cramois' tenure, coinciding with the Trente Glorieuses of postwar economic growth, the bank began offering loans for young farmers and rural housing in general as well as direct loans to local governments for infrastructure projects. In 1963, Crédit Agricole was independently profitable for the first time. According to Le Monde, Cramois

est considéré comme le responsable de l'évolution de cet organisme, qui a connu en dix-huit ans une expansion considérable et est devenu un des premiers établissements de crédit en France.

[is considered responsible for the evolution of this institution, which has experienced considerable expansion in eighteen years and has become one of the leading credit institutions in France.]

Meantime, Cramois was serving in positions from adviser to the Bank of France to President of the Société Française d'Economie Rurale (1955–1959) and President of the Académie d'Agriculture de France.

Nevertheless, Cramois' long tenure and establishment status—he, Desigauz and his predecessor Louis Tardy, who was Cramois' father-in-law, all came from the Inspectorate—put him at odds with Prime Minister Georges Pompidou and Agriculture Minister Edgard Pisani, who wanted to modernise agricultural lending. Cramois, by then "a semi-legendary figure," according to Le Monde ("personnage quasiment historique") was replaced by an outsider, Jacques Mayoux, on 7 September 1963. Mayoux continued expanding Crédit Agricole, which became by his own forced ouster in 1975 the leading financial institution in Europe. State involvement in Crédit Agricole ended when the bank was fully mutualised in 1988.

In retirement, Cramois remained active, acting as Director of the Crédit Agricole regional bank in Île-de-France; Conseiller d'État until 1966; and President of the International Confederation for Agricultural Credit from 1961 to 1978. Cramois was by 1958 both Commander of the Legion of Honour and Commander of the Order of Agricultural Merit. He also served as Mayor of Coulon from 1961 to 1976.

Cramois died in Coulon on 14 April 1978, aged 77. A road there is named in his honour. He was the son-in-law of Tardy, the "father of agricultural credit" in France and a founder of Crédit Agricole.

== Works ==
The following list of authored works is taken from IdRef (Identifiants et Référentials):

- Le crédit agricole dans nos possessions d'Outre-mer ... (with Louis Tardy). Imprimerie nationale, 1935.
- Le mouvement coopératif agricole et ses possibilités de développement (report of the Conseil national économique meeting of 15 and 16 March 1937 presented by Cramois et al.) Imprimerie administrative de Melun, 1937.
- Coopératives agricoles : pourquoi et comment le paysan français est devenu coopérateur. Centre national d'information économique, c. 1946.
- Le Crédit agricole en France (lecture delivered 1 July 1946). Les cours de droit, 1946.
- "Les problèmes techniques de la trésorerie des exploitations agricoles." In Bulletin de la Société française d'économie rurale, vol. III, no. 2, April 1951, pp. 67–73.
- Concours apporté par le crédit agricole à la sauvegarde et à la modernisation de l'exploitation agricole à structure familiale. La Documentation française, 1958.

Cramois also contributed to the books Memento du chimiste (1927) and La Science et ses applications (1930).
