= Crisnée =

Municipality in Liège Province, Wallonia, Belgium

Crisnée Crusnêye (Walloon)
- Municipality
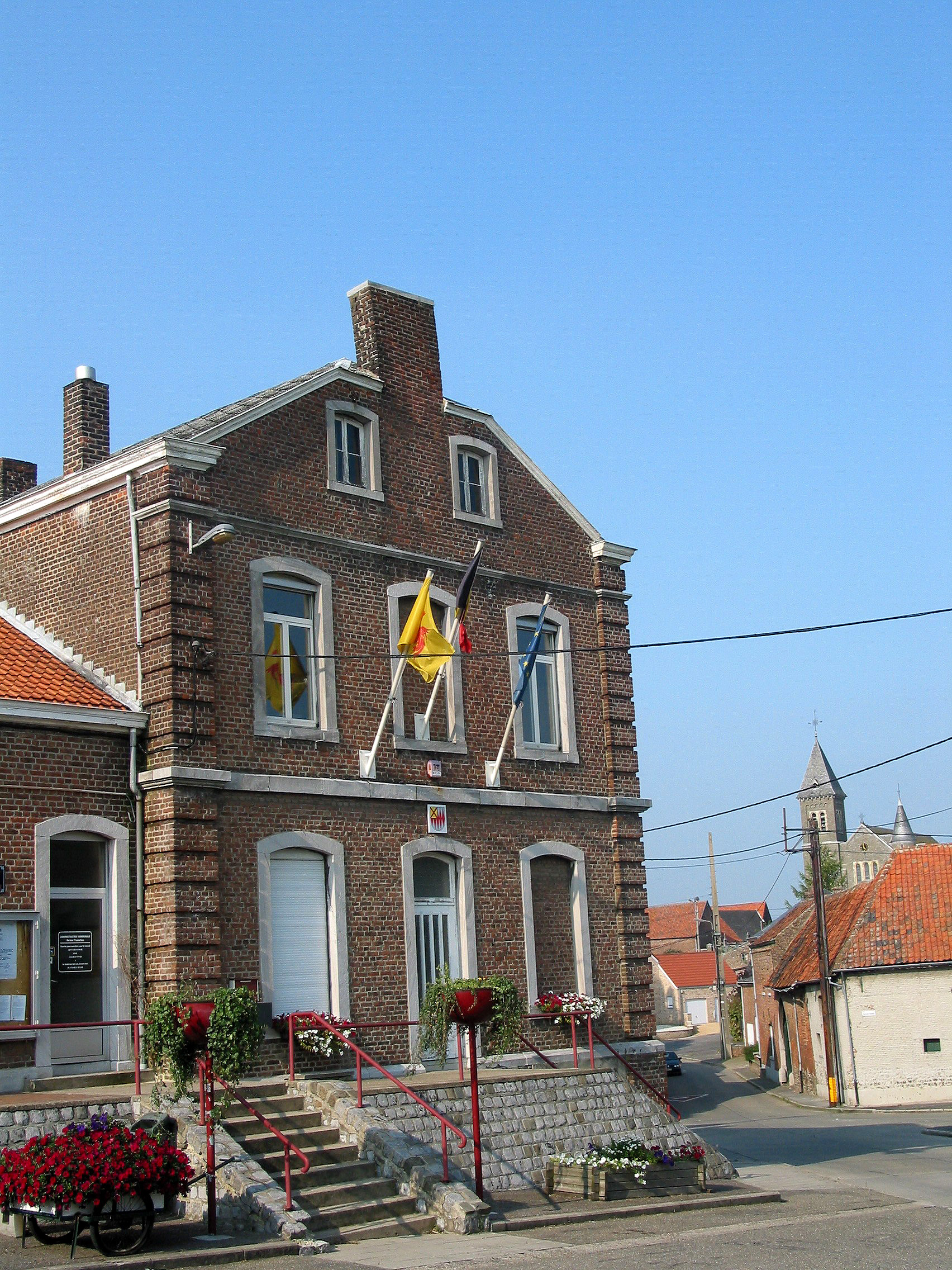

- Flag Coat of arms

- Location of Crisnée in the province of Liège
- Interactive map of Crisnée
- Location in Belgium
- Coordinates: 50°43′N 05°24′E
- Country: Belgium
- Community: French Community
- Region: Wallonia
- Province: Liège
- Arrondissement: Waremme

Government
  - Mayor: Philippe Goffin (MR)
  - Governing party: Maïeur

Area
  - Total: 16.97 km^{2} (6.55 sq mi)

Population (2018-01-01)
  - Total: 3,352
  - Density: 197.5/km^{2} (511.6/sq mi)
- Postal codes: 4367
- NIS code: 64021
- Area codes: 04
- Website: www.crisnee.be

Crisnée (French pronunciation: [kʁisne]; Walloon: Crusnêye) is a municipality of Wallonia located in the province of Liège, Belgium.

It covers an area of 16.83 km^{2} and on 1 January 2013 had a total population of 3,094, giving a population density on that date of 184 inhabitants per km^{2}.

The municipality consists of the following districts: Crisnée, Fize-le-Marsal, Kemexhe, Odeur, and Thys.

Crisnée is twinned with the commune of Sansais, Nouvelle-Aquitaine, in western France.

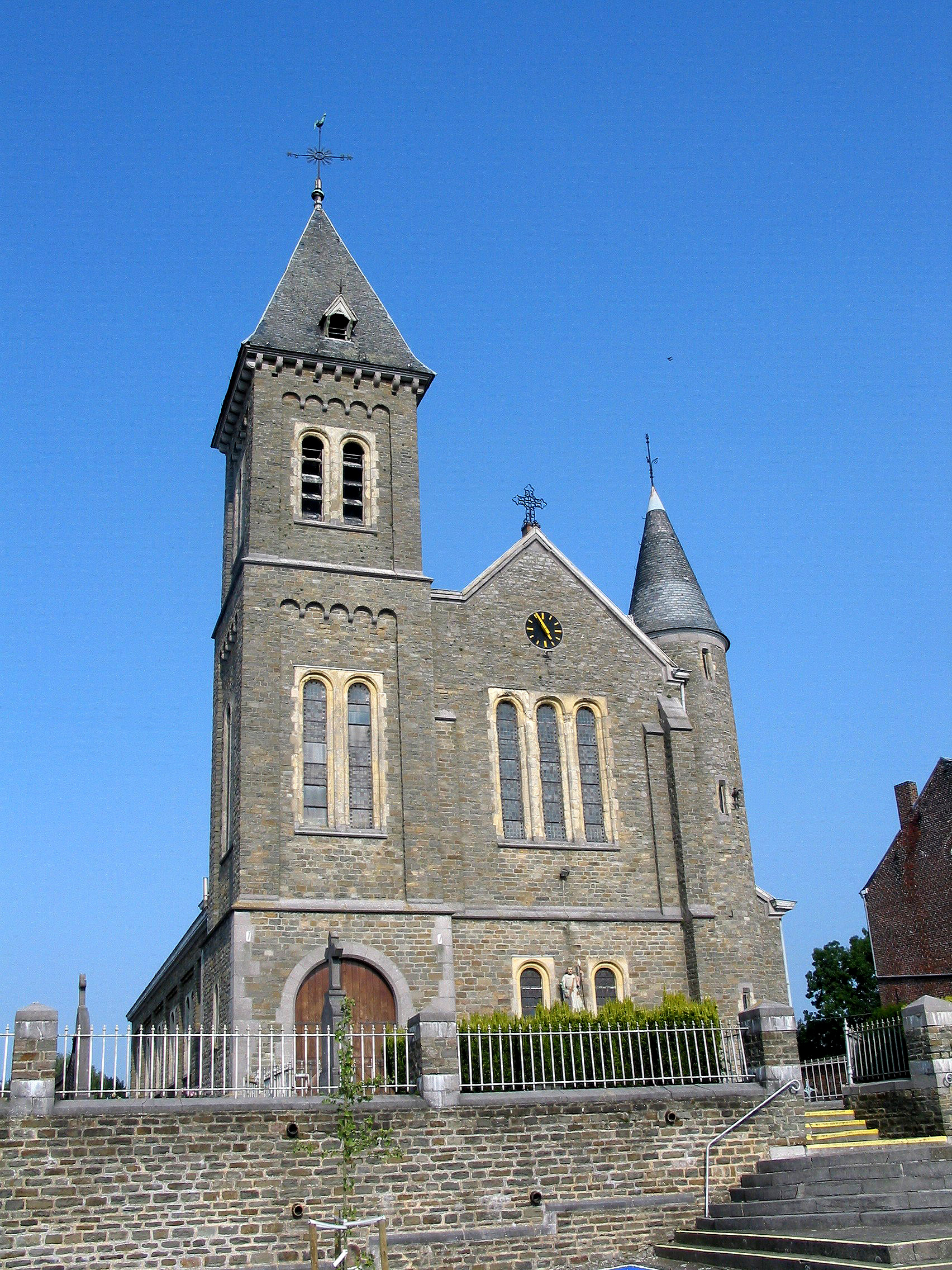
Church of Saint Maurice

== See also ==
- List of protected heritage sites in Crisnée
