= Coulon, Deux-Sèvres =

Commune in Nouvelle-Aquitaine, France

Coulon
- Commune
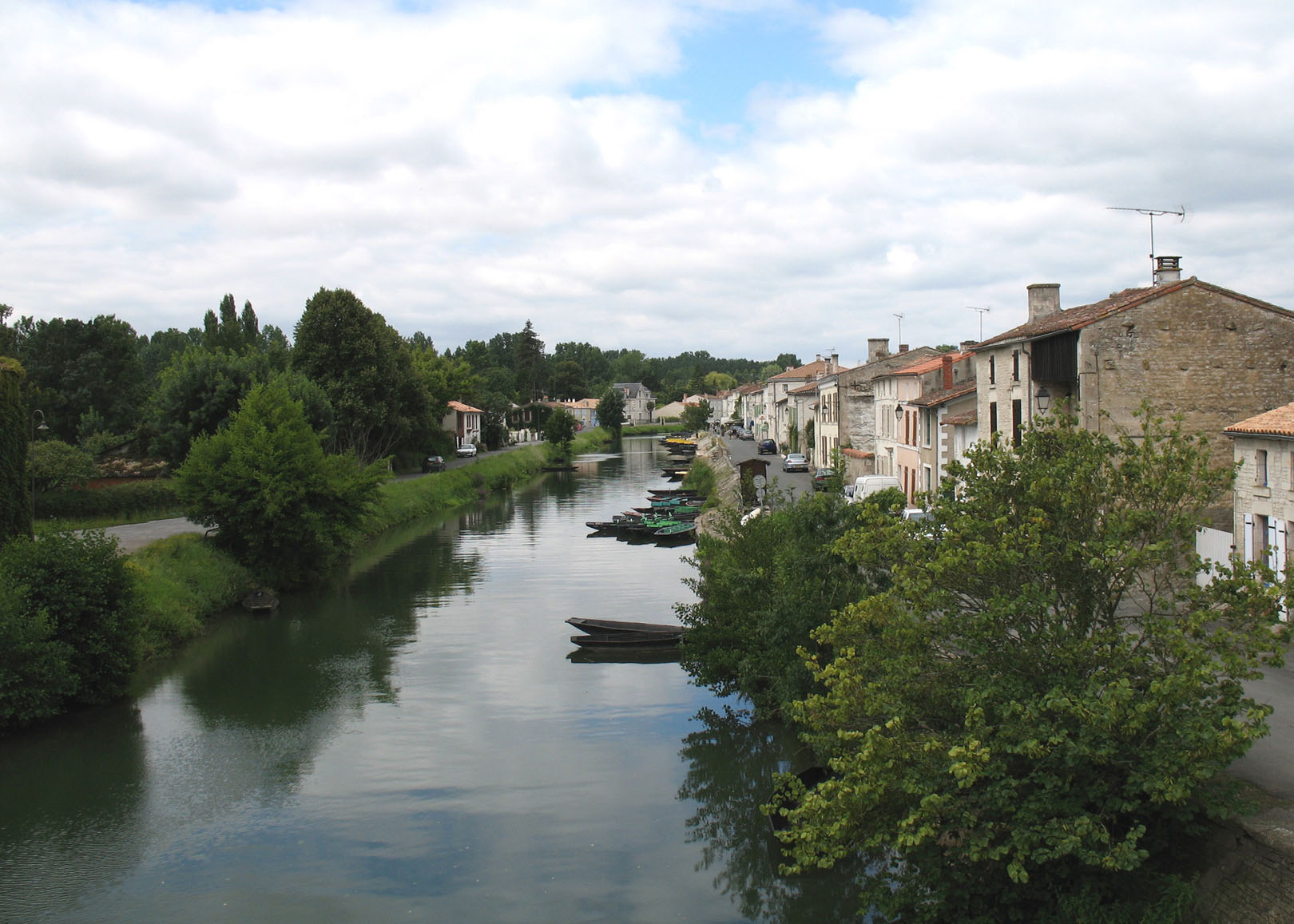
- Louis Tardy Quay in Coulon, 2007
- Location of Coulon
- Location within France Location within Nouvelle-Aquitaine
- Coordinates: 46°19′27″N 0°35′02″W
- Country: France
- Region: Nouvelle-Aquitaine
- Department: Deux-Sèvres
- Arrondissement: Niort
- Canton: Frontenay-Rohan-Rohan
- Intercommunality: CA Niortais

Government
  - Mayor (2026–32): Anne-Sophie Guichet
- Area^{1}: 29.79 km^{2} (11.50 sq mi)
- Elevation: 15 m (49 ft)
- Highest elevation: 81 m (266 ft)
- Lowest elevation: 0 m (0 ft)
- Population (2023): 2,299
  - Density: 77.17/km^{2} (199.9/sq mi)
- Time zone: UTC+01:00 (CET)
  - Summer (DST): UTC+02:00 (CEST)
- INSEE/Postal code: 79100 /79510
- ^{1} French Land Register data, which excludes lakes, ponds, glaciers > 1 km^{2} (0.386 sq mi or 247 acres) and river estuaries.

Coulon (French pronunciation: [kulɔ̃]) is a commune in the Deux-Sèvres department in the Nouvelle-Aquitaine region in western France. The bibliographer Louis Perceau (1883–1942) was born in the village.

== Population ==
Historical population
Year	Pop.	±% p.a.
1968	1,461	—
1975	1,462	+0.01%
1982	1,660	+1.83%
1990	1,870	+1.50%
1999	2,074	+1.16%
2007	2,210	+0.80%
2012	2,238	+0.25%
2017	2,263	+0.22%
2023	2,299	+0.26%
Source: INSEE

== Politics ==
The current mayor of Coulon is an independent, Anne-Sophie Guichet, who was elected unopposed to a second term on 18 March 2026. She is the first woman mayor and the tenth to serve since the Liberation.

Mayoral history since 1944
Mayor	Term start	Term end
Louis Tardy	1944	1947
Pierre Vallaud	1947	1961
André Cramois	1961	1976
Maurice Moinard	1976	1989
Pierre Rousseau	1989	1998
Jacques Rousseau	1998	2001
Michel Grasset	2001	2008
Albert Cheminet	2008	2011
Michel Simon	2011	2020
Anne-Sophie Guichet	2020	

== See also ==
- Communes of the Deux-Sèvres department
