= Échiré =

- Commune
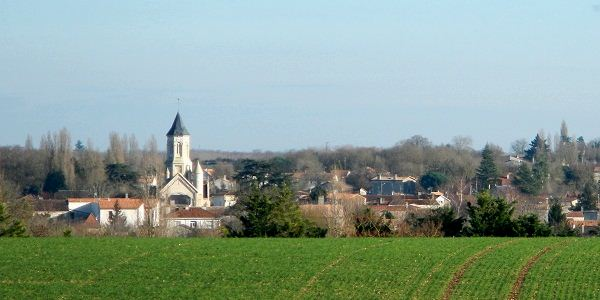
- A general view of Échiré
- Location of Échiré
- Location within France Location within Nouvelle-Aquitaine
- Coordinates: 46°23′24″N 0°24′52″W
- Country: France
- Region: Nouvelle-Aquitaine
- Department: Deux-Sèvres
- Arrondissement: Niort
- Canton: La Plaine Niortaise
- Intercommunality: CA Niortais

Government
  - Mayor (2020–2026): Thierry Devautour
- Area^{1}: 30.96 km^{2} (11.95 sq mi)
- Elevation: 30 m (98 ft)
- Highest elevation: 89 m (292 ft)
- Lowest elevation: 17 m (56 ft)
- Population (2023): 3,549
  - Density: 114.6/km^{2} (296.9/sq mi)
- Time zone: UTC+01:00 (CET)
  - Summer (DST): UTC+02:00 (CEST)
- INSEE/Postal code: 79109 /79410
- ^{1} French Land Register data, which excludes lakes, ponds, glaciers > 1 km^{2} (0.386 sq mi or 247 acres) and river estuaries.

Échiré (French pronunciation: [eʃiʁe]) is a commune in the Deux-Sèvres department in the Nouvelle-Aquitaine region in western France.

== History ==
Knowledge of Echiré has been enhanced by recent archeological investigations. The 'Les Loups' (Literally 'The Wolves') site identified by Maurice Marsac using aerial photography comprises a late Neolithic defensive site protected by two ditches adapted from a dried up valley and from the course of the River Sèvre Niortaise. The lesser of the two ditches, which surrounds the smaller portion of the fort, has yielded pottery fragments that indicate connections with the more extensive archaeological site of Kroh Kollé at Saint-Pierre-Quiberon to the north. Elsewhere the tomb of a young woman with a baby provides evidence of a double perinatal death.

Other archaeological sites have been identified by Marsac, including the remains of a Gallic farm.

In the centre of the little town, near to the church, survive the remains of a Gallo-Roman temple, rediscovered at the beginning of the twentieth century.

== Population ==
Historical population
Year	Pop.	±% p.a.
1968	1,452	—
1975	1,971	+4.46%
1982	2,565	+3.83%
1990	2,744	+0.85%
1999	2,889	+0.57%
2007	3,230	+1.40%
2012	3,282	+0.32%
2017	3,371	+0.54%
2023	3,549	+0.86%
Source: INSEE

== Economy ==
The town's economy is based on the local dairy which produces the well-regarded Échiré brand of butter. Other residents commute to Niort where the insurance industry is a significant source of employment.

== Main sights ==
Échiré is home to three castles classified as historic monuments (in French "monuments historiques"): Coudray-Salbart, a middle-age fortress dating back to the 13th century, La Taillée, built in the 17th century, and Mursay, a former residence of Agrippa d'Aubigné. The church of Notre-Dame dates back from the end of the 11th century.

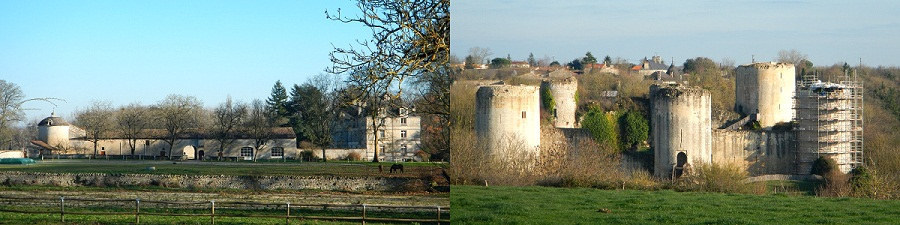
The La Taillée and Coudray-Salbart castles in December 2014.

The river Sèvre Niortaise winds in the commune territory for 18 km, offering opportunities for walks, picnics and angling. The famous GR 36 walking route crosses Échiré, following the river banks.

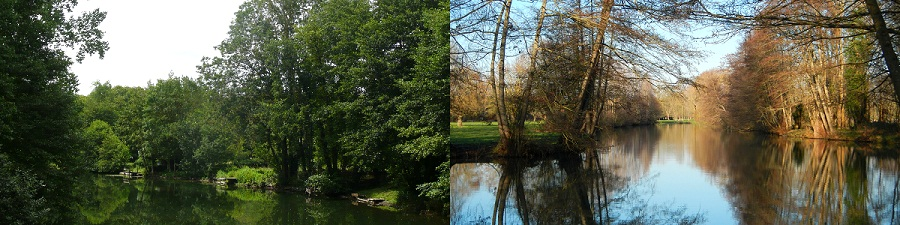
The river Sèvre in Échiré in August 2012 and in December 2014.

== See also ==
- Communes of the Deux-Sèvres department
