= Juscorps =

- Commune
- Location of Juscorps
- Location within France Location within Nouvelle-Aquitaine
- Coordinates: 46°12′50″N 0°23′05″W
- Country: France
- Region: Nouvelle-Aquitaine
- Department: Deux-Sèvres
- Arrondissement: Niort
- Canton: La Plaine Niortaise
- Intercommunality: CA Niortais

Government
  - Mayor (2020–2026): Corinne Rivet Bonneau
- Area^{1}: 6.48 km^{2} (2.50 sq mi)
- Elevation: 45 m (148 ft)
- Highest elevation: 66 m (217 ft)
- Lowest elevation: 42 m (138 ft)
- Population (2023): 382
  - Density: 59.0/km^{2} (153/sq mi)
- Time zone: UTC+01:00 (CET)
  - Summer (DST): UTC+02:00 (CEST)
- INSEE/Postal code: 79144 /79230
- ^{1} French Land Register data, which excludes lakes, ponds, glaciers > 1 km^{2} (0.386 sq mi or 247 acres) and river estuaries.

Juscorps is a commune in the Deux-Sèvres department in western France.

== See also ==
- Communes of the Deux-Sèvres department
