= Fors, Deux-Sèvres =

Fors
- Commune
- Coat of arms
- Location of Fors
- Location within France Location within Nouvelle-Aquitaine
- Coordinates: 46°14′14″N 0°24′29″W
- Country: France
- Region: Nouvelle-Aquitaine
- Department: Deux-Sèvres
- Arrondissement: Niort
- Canton: Frontenay-Rohan-Rohan
- Intercommunality: CA Niortais

Government
  - Mayor (2020–2026): Alain Canteau
- Area^{1}: 18.82 km^{2} (7.27 sq mi)
- Elevation: 55 m (180 ft)
- Highest elevation: 66 m (217 ft)
- Lowest elevation: 25 m (82 ft)
- Population (2023): 1,780
  - Density: 94.6/km^{2} (245/sq mi)
- Time zone: UTC+01:00 (CET)
  - Summer (DST): UTC+02:00 (CEST)
- INSEE/Postal code: 79125 /79230
- ^{1} French Land Register data, which excludes lakes, ponds, glaciers > 1 km^{2} (0.386 sq mi or 247 acres) and river estuaries.

Fors is a commune in the Deux-Sèvres department in the Nouvelle-Aquitaine region in western France.

== See also ==
- Communes of the Deux-Sèvres department
