= Chauray =

- Commune
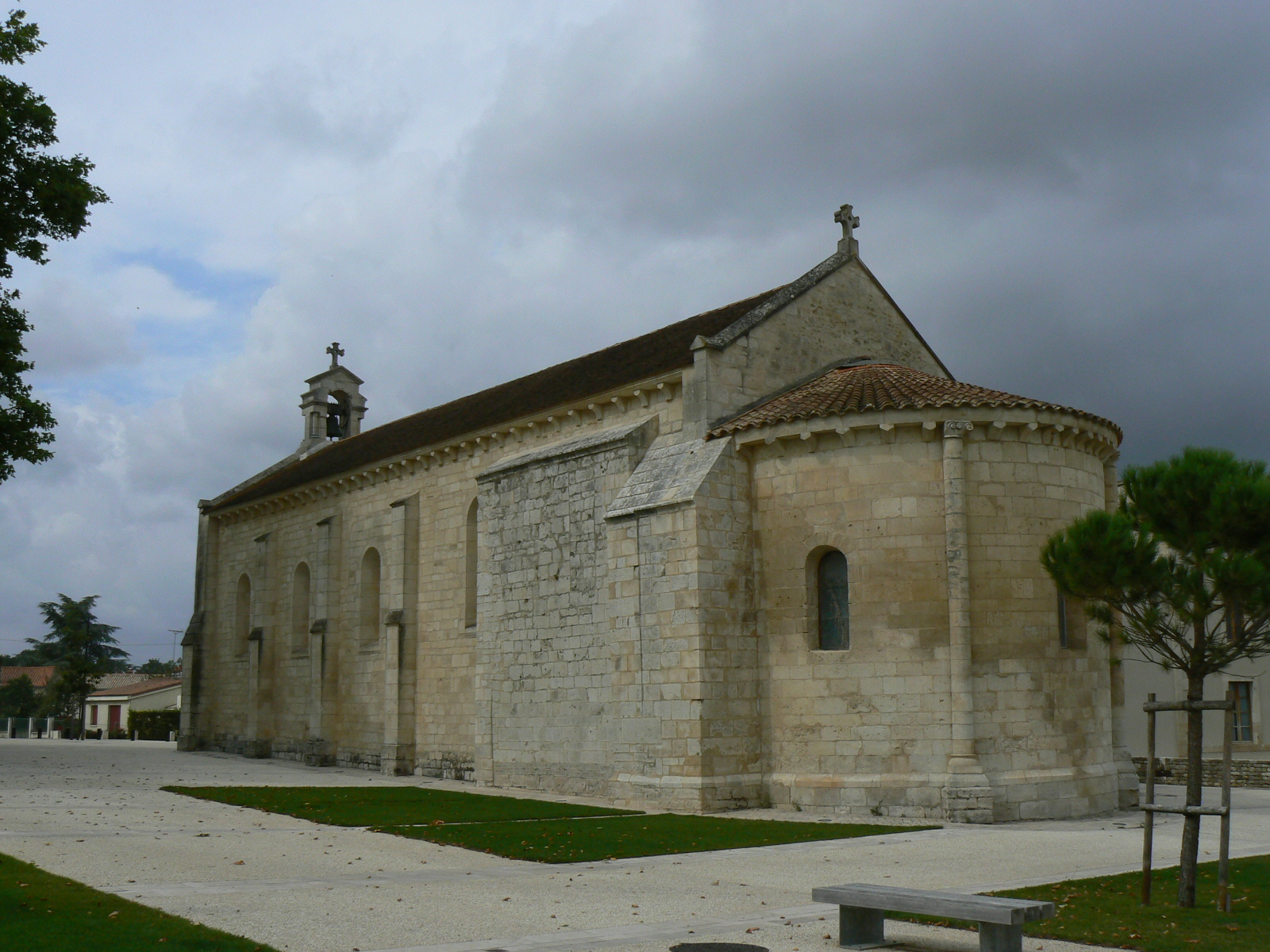
- The church in Chauray

- Coat of arms
- Location of Chauray
- Location within France Location within Nouvelle-Aquitaine
- Coordinates: 46°21′41″N 0°22′34″W
- Country: France
- Region: Nouvelle-Aquitaine
- Department: Deux-Sèvres
- Arrondissement: Niort
- Canton: La Plaine Niortaise
- Intercommunality: CA Niortais

Government
  - Mayor (2020–2026): Claude Boisson
- Area^{1}: 14.50 km^{2} (5.60 sq mi)
- Elevation: 68 m (223 ft)
- Highest elevation: 91 m (299 ft)
- Lowest elevation: 32 m (105 ft)
- Population (2023): 7,221
  - Density: 498.0/km^{2} (1,290/sq mi)
- Time zone: UTC+01:00 (CET)
  - Summer (DST): UTC+02:00 (CEST)
- INSEE/Postal code: 79081 /79180
- ^{1} French Land Register data, which excludes lakes, ponds, glaciers > 1 km^{2} (0.386 sq mi or 247 acres) and river estuaries.

Chauray (French pronunciation: [ʃoʁɛ]) is a commune in the Deux-Sèvres department in the Nouvelle-Aquitaine region in western France.

== Population ==
Historical population
Year	Pop.	±% p.a.
1968	966	—
1975	2,100	+11.73%
1982	3,215	+6.27%
1990	4,661	+4.75%
1999	4,831	+0.40%
2007	5,085	+0.64%
2012	6,483	+4.98%
2017	7,006	+1.56%
2023	7,221	+0.51%
Source: INSEE

== Economy ==
The commune is home to the La Galerie-Niort shopping centre. The former Géant Casino hypermarket at the site was planned to be redeveloped for several retailers, including Lidl and Normal.

== See also ==
- Communes of the Deux-Sèvres department
