= Amuré =

- Commune
- Location of Amuré
- Location within France Location within Nouvelle-Aquitaine
- Coordinates: 46°15′59″N 0°37′35″W
- Country: France
- Region: Nouvelle-Aquitaine
- Department: Deux-Sèvres
- Arrondissement: Niort
- Canton: Frontenay-Rohan-Rohan
- Intercommunality: Niortais

Government
  - Mayor (2020–2026): Marcel Moinard
- Area^{1}: 14.86 km^{2} (5.74 sq mi)
- Elevation: 20 m (66 ft)
- Highest elevation: 28 m (92 ft)
- Lowest elevation: 3 m (9.8 ft)
- Population (2023): 429
  - Density: 28.9/km^{2} (74.8/sq mi)
- Time zone: UTC+01:00 (CET)
  - Summer (DST): UTC+02:00 (CEST)
- INSEE/Postal code: 79009 /79210
- ^{1} French Land Register data, which excludes lakes, ponds, glaciers > 1 km^{2} (0.386 sq mi or 247 acres) and river estuaries.

Amuré (French pronunciation: [amyʁe]) is a commune in the Deux-Sèvres department in the Nouvelle-Aquitaine region in western France.

== See also ==
- Communes of the Deux-Sèvres department
