= Sansais =

- Commune
- Location of Sansais
- Location within France Location within Nouvelle-Aquitaine
- Coordinates: 46°16′29″N 0°35′03″W
- Country: France
- Region: Nouvelle-Aquitaine
- Department: Deux-Sèvres
- Arrondissement: Niort
- Canton: Frontenay-Rohan-Rohan
- Intercommunality: CA Niortais

Government
  - Mayor (2020–2026): Richard Pailloux
- Area^{1}: 14.94 km^{2} (5.77 sq mi)
- Elevation: 25 m (82 ft)
- Highest elevation: 32 m (105 ft)
- Lowest elevation: 1 m (3.3 ft)
- Population (2023): 760
  - Density: 51/km^{2} (130/sq mi)
- Time zone: UTC+01:00 (CET)
  - Summer (DST): UTC+02:00 (CEST)
- INSEE/Postal code: 79304 /79270
- ^{1} French Land Register data, which excludes lakes, ponds, glaciers > 1 km^{2} (0.386 sq mi or 247 acres) and river estuaries.

Sansais (French pronunciation: [sɑ̃sɛ]) is a commune in the Deux-Sèvres department and Nouvelle-Aquitaine region of western France.

It is twinned with the municipality of Crisnée, Wallonia in Belgium.

== See also ==
- Communes of the Deux-Sèvres department
