= Arçais =

- Commune
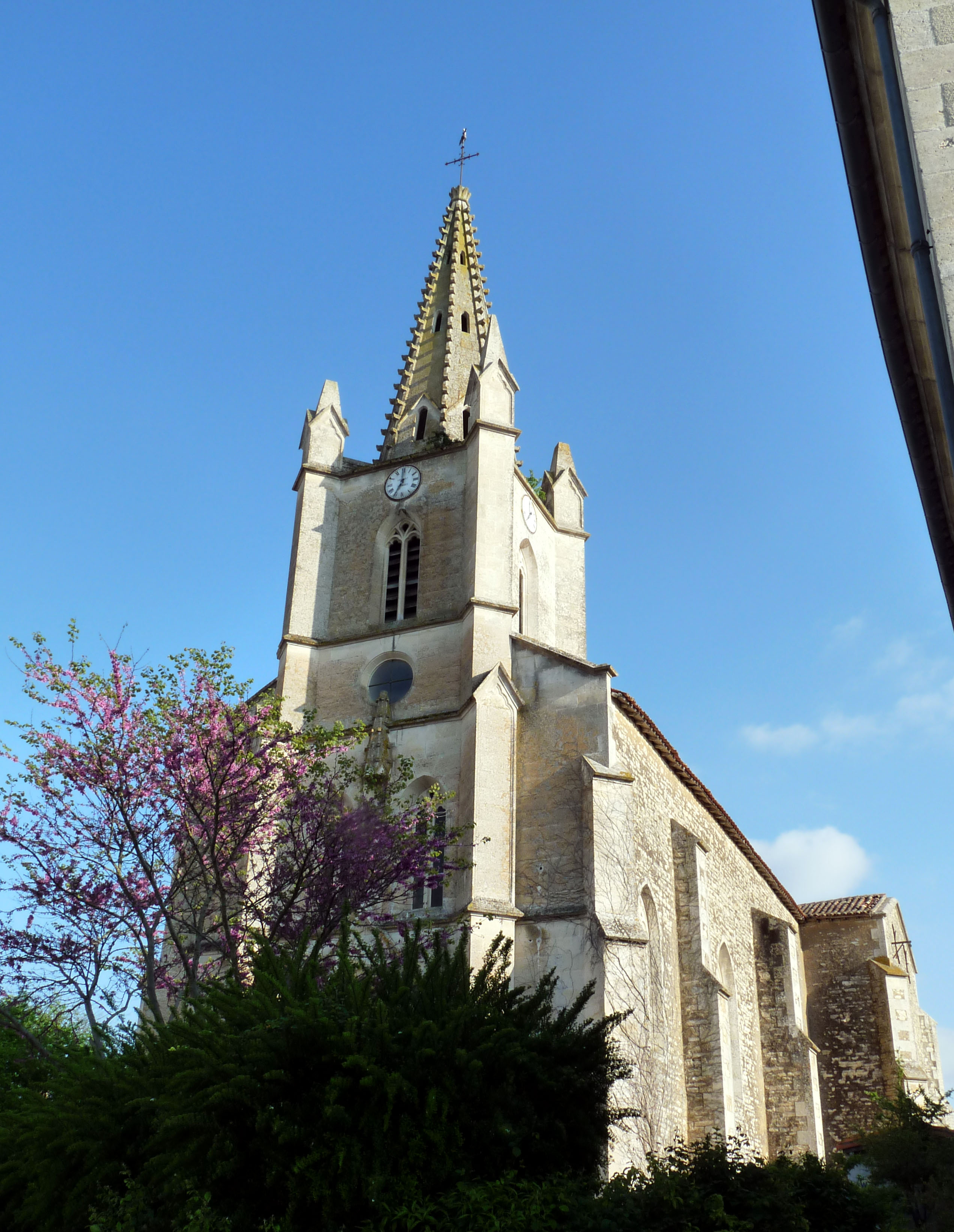
- The church in Arçais
- Location of Arçais
- Location within France Location within Nouvelle-Aquitaine
- Coordinates: 46°17′49″N 0°41′23″W
- Country: France
- Region: Nouvelle-Aquitaine
- Department: Deux-Sèvres
- Arrondissement: Niort
- Canton: Frontenay-Rohan-Rohan
- Intercommunality: CA Niortais

Government
  - Mayor (2020–2026): Philippe Leyssene
- Area^{1}: 15.12 km^{2} (5.84 sq mi)
- Elevation: 13 m (43 ft)
- Highest elevation: 36 m (118 ft)
- Lowest elevation: 1 m (3.3 ft)
- Population (2023): 615
  - Density: 40.7/km^{2} (105/sq mi)
- Time zone: UTC+01:00 (CET)
  - Summer (DST): UTC+02:00 (CEST)
- INSEE/Postal code: 79010 /79210
- ^{1} French Land Register data, which excludes lakes, ponds, glaciers > 1 km^{2} (0.386 sq mi or 247 acres) and river estuaries.

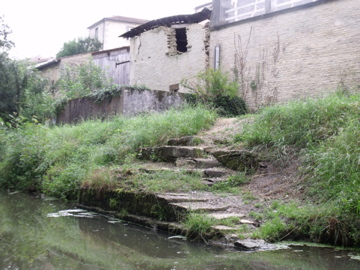

Arçais (French pronunciation: [aʁsɛ]) is a commune in the Deux-Sèvres department in the Nouvelle-Aquitaine region in western France. It is the only village which is located in the centre of the Marais Mouillé, the so-called "wet marsh" which forms the eastern half of the Marais Poitevin (the Poitou Marshes), near the city of Niort. It is a popular centre for tourism, with several embarcadères which hire out punts and other boats for use on the network of canals that surrounds the village. There are also several shops, bars and other facilities, including bike hire.

== See also ==
- Communes of the Deux-Sèvres department
