= Épannes =

- Commune
- Coat of arms
- Location of Épannes
- Location within France Location within Nouvelle-Aquitaine
- Coordinates: 46°13′53″N 0°34′57″W
- Country: France
- Region: Nouvelle-Aquitaine
- Department: Deux-Sèvres
- Arrondissement: Niort
- Canton: Frontenay-Rohan-Rohan
- Intercommunality: CA Niortais

Government
  - Mayor (2020–2026): Emmanuel Exposito
- Area^{1}: 8.01 km^{2} (3.09 sq mi)
- Elevation: 22 m (72 ft)
- Highest elevation: 52 m (171 ft)
- Lowest elevation: 11 m (36 ft)
- Population (2023): 851
  - Density: 106/km^{2} (275/sq mi)
- Time zone: UTC+01:00 (CET)
  - Summer (DST): UTC+02:00 (CEST)
- INSEE/Postal code: 79112 /79270
- ^{1} French Land Register data, which excludes lakes, ponds, glaciers > 1 km^{2} (0.386 sq mi or 247 acres) and river estuaries.

Épannes (pronounced [epan]) is a commune, near Niort, in the Deux-Sèvres department, Nouvelle-Aquitaine, western France.

== See also ==
- Communes of the Deux-Sèvres department
