= Prahecq =

- Commune
- Location of Prahecq
- Location within France Location within Nouvelle-Aquitaine
- Coordinates: 46°15′34″N 0°20′41″W
- Country: France
- Region: Nouvelle-Aquitaine
- Department: Deux-Sèvres
- Arrondissement: Niort
- Canton: La Plaine Niortaise
- Intercommunality: CA Niortais

Government
  - Mayor (2020–2026): Sonia Lussiez
- Area^{1}: 24.95 km^{2} (9.63 sq mi)
- Elevation: 44 m (144 ft)
- Highest elevation: 78 m (256 ft)
- Lowest elevation: 24 m (79 ft)
- Population (2023): 2,252
  - Density: 90.26/km^{2} (233.8/sq mi)
- Time zone: UTC+01:00 (CET)
  - Summer (DST): UTC+02:00 (CEST)
- INSEE/Postal code: 79216 /79230
- ^{1} French Land Register data, which excludes lakes, ponds, glaciers > 1 km^{2} (0.386 sq mi or 247 acres) and river estuaries.

Prahecq (French pronunciation: [pʁa.ɛk]) is a commune in the Deux-Sèvres department, western France.

== Population ==
Historical population
Year	Pop.	±% p.a.
1968	939	—
1975	1,051	+1.62%
1982	1,495	+5.16%
1990	1,613	+0.95%
1999	1,651	+0.26%
2007	1,994	+2.39%
2012	2,043	+0.49%
2017	2,179	+1.30%
2023	2,252	+0.55%
Source: INSEE

== See also ==
- Communes of the Deux-Sèvres department
