= Brûlain =

- Commune
- Location of Brûlain
- Location within France Location within Nouvelle-Aquitaine
- Coordinates: 46°12′10″N 0°19′11″W
- Country: France
- Region: Nouvelle-Aquitaine
- Department: Deux-Sèvres
- Arrondissement: Niort
- Canton: La Plaine Niortaise
- Intercommunality: CA Niortais

Government
  - Mayor (2020–2026): Alain Lecointe
- Area^{1}: 24.67 km^{2} (9.53 sq mi)
- Elevation: 68 m (223 ft)
- Highest elevation: 89 m (292 ft)
- Lowest elevation: 46 m (151 ft)
- Population (2023): 735
  - Density: 29.8/km^{2} (77.2/sq mi)
- Time zone: UTC+01:00 (CET)
  - Summer (DST): UTC+02:00 (CEST)
- INSEE/Postal code: 79058 /79230
- ^{1} French Land Register data, which excludes lakes, ponds, glaciers > 1 km^{2} (0.386 sq mi or 247 acres) and river estuaries.

Brûlain (French pronunciation: [bʁylɛ̃]) is a commune in the Deux-Sèvres department in the Nouvelle-Aquitaine region in western France.

== See also ==
- Communes of the Deux-Sèvres department
