= Fize-le-Marsal =

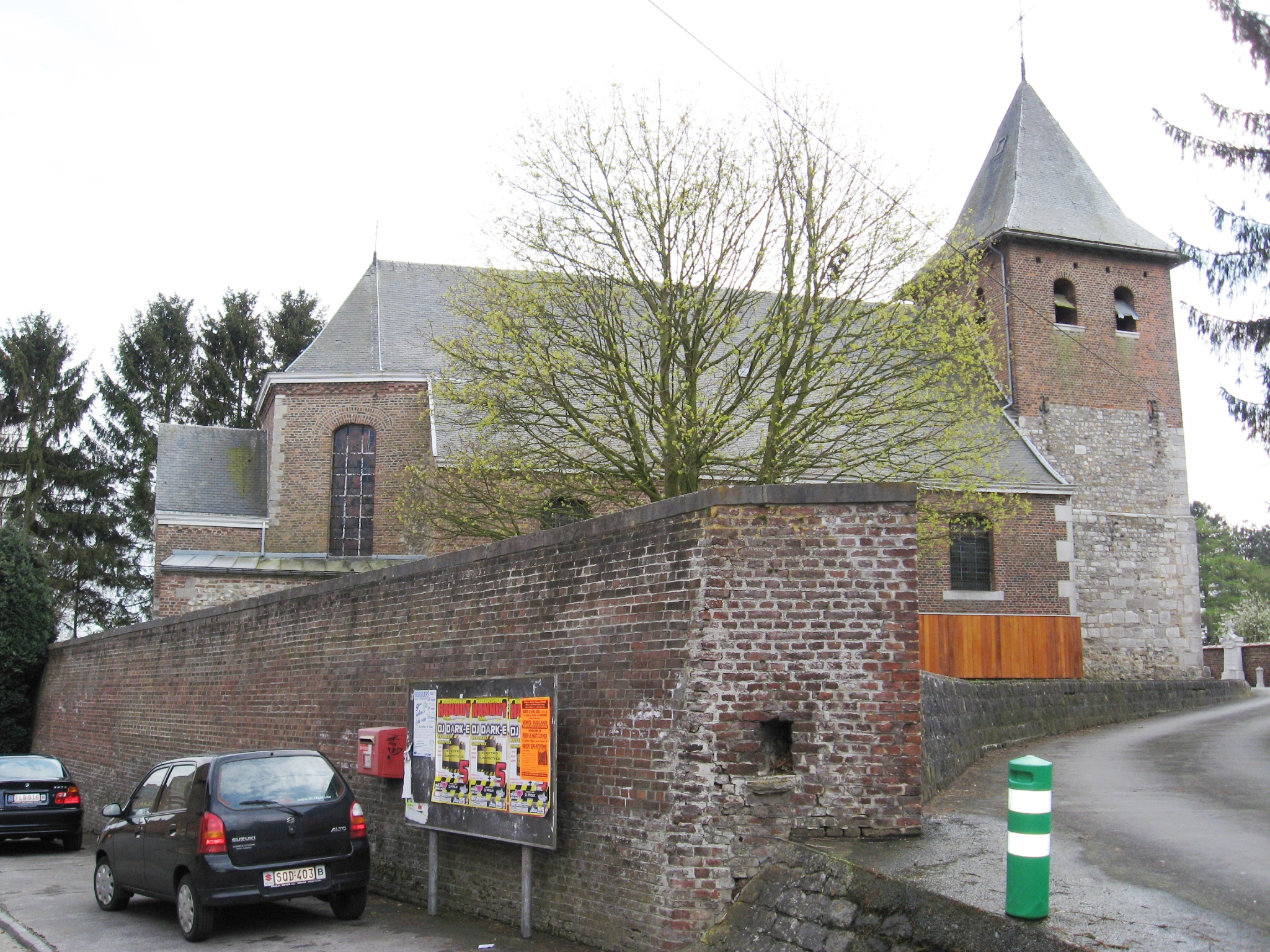
- Fize-le-Marsal, village church

- Location within Belgium Location within Europe
- Coordinates: 50°42′10″N 05°23′09″E
- Country: Belgium
- Region: Wallonia
- Province: Liège
- Municipality: Crisnée

Fize-le-Marsal (French pronunciation: [fiz lə maʁsal]; Walloon: Fize-li-Mårsale) is a locality in Wallonia and a district of the municipality of Crisnée, located in the province of Liège, Belgium.

During the Middle Ages, the village was subservient to the cathedral chapter of Liège Cathedral, but given as a fief to several different families at different times. The village church dates from the Middle Ages but was heavily reconstructed during the 16th and 18th centuries.
