= Saint-Martin-de-Bernegoue =

- Commune
- Location of Saint-Martin-de-Bernegoue
- Location within France Location within Nouvelle-Aquitaine
- Coordinates: 46°14′15″N 0°20′50″W
- Country: France
- Region: Nouvelle-Aquitaine
- Department: Deux-Sèvres
- Arrondissement: Niort
- Canton: La Plaine Niortaise
- Intercommunality: CA Niortais

Government
  - Mayor (2020–2026): Frederic Nourrigeon
- Area^{1}: 17.75 km^{2} (6.85 sq mi)
- Elevation: 75 m (246 ft)
- Highest elevation: 88 m (289 ft)
- Lowest elevation: 28 m (92 ft)
- Population (2023): 806
  - Density: 45.4/km^{2} (118/sq mi)
- Time zone: UTC+01:00 (CET)
  - Summer (DST): UTC+02:00 (CEST)
- INSEE/Postal code: 79273 /79230
- ^{1} French Land Register data, which excludes lakes, ponds, glaciers > 1 km^{2} (0.386 sq mi or 247 acres) and river estuaries.

Saint-Martin-de-Bernegoue (French pronunciation: [sɛ̃ maʁtɛ̃ də bɛʁnəɡu]) is a commune in the Deux-Sèvres department in western France.

== See also ==
- Communes of the Deux-Sèvres department
