= Le Vanneau-Irleau =

- Commune
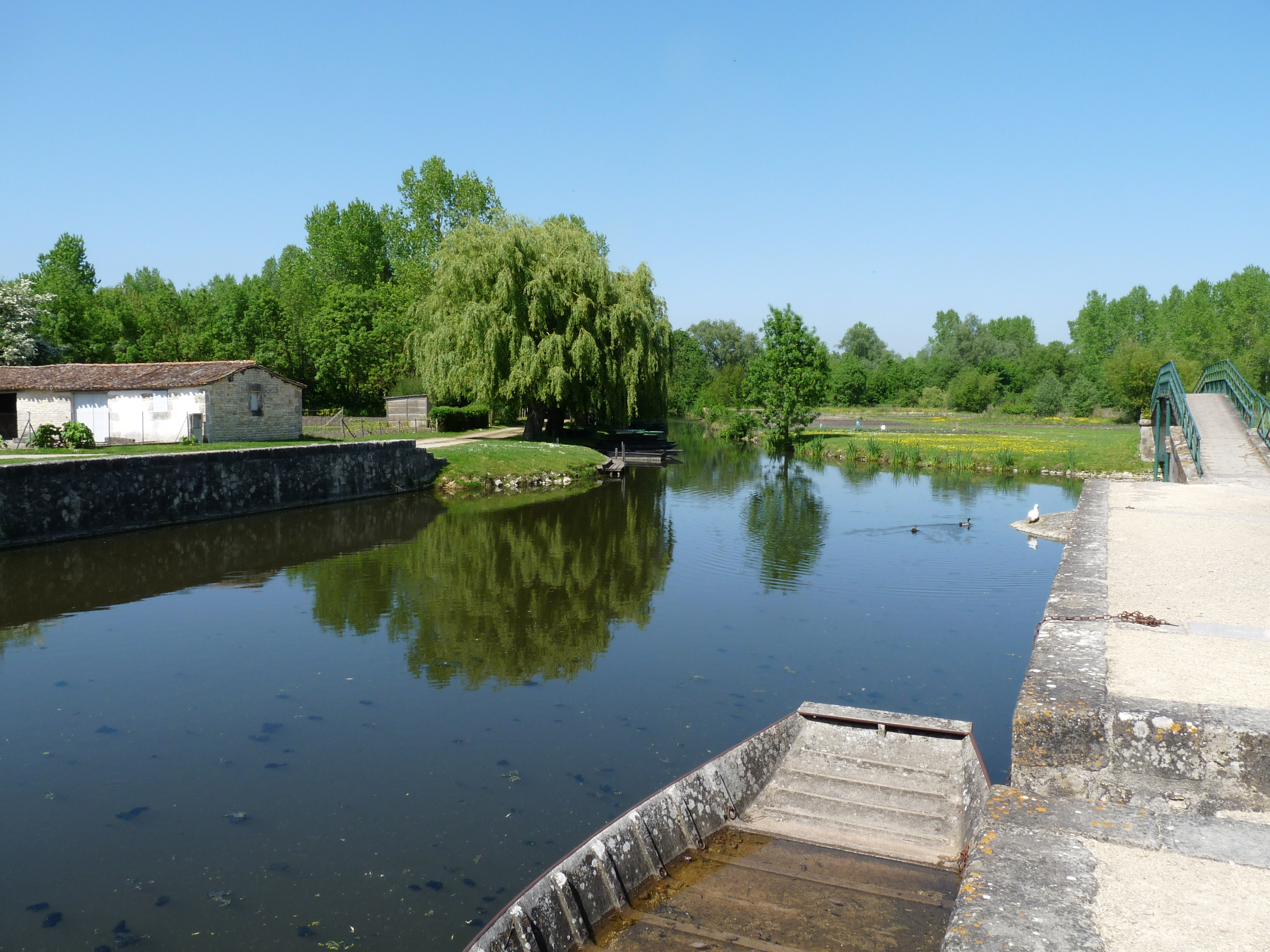
- The harbour of Le Vanneau
- Location of Le Vanneau-Irleau
- Location within France Location within Nouvelle-Aquitaine
- Coordinates: 46°17′46″N 0°38′01″W
- Country: France
- Region: Nouvelle-Aquitaine
- Department: Deux-Sèvres
- Arrondissement: Niort
- Canton: Frontenay-Rohan-Rohan
- Intercommunality: CA Niortais

Government
  - Mayor (2020–2026): Nadia Jauzelon
- Area^{1}: 14.17 km^{2} (5.47 sq mi)
- Elevation: 30 m (98 ft)
- Highest elevation: 29 m (95 ft)
- Lowest elevation: 0 m (0 ft)
- Population (2023): 860
  - Density: 61/km^{2} (160/sq mi)
- Time zone: UTC+01:00 (CET)
  - Summer (DST): UTC+02:00 (CEST)
- INSEE/Postal code: 79337 /79270
- ^{1} French Land Register data, which excludes lakes, ponds, glaciers > 1 km^{2} (0.386 sq mi or 247 acres) and river estuaries.

Le Vanneau-Irleau (French pronunciation: [lə vano iʁlo], before 1999: Le Vanneau) is a commune in the Deux-Sèvres department in western France.

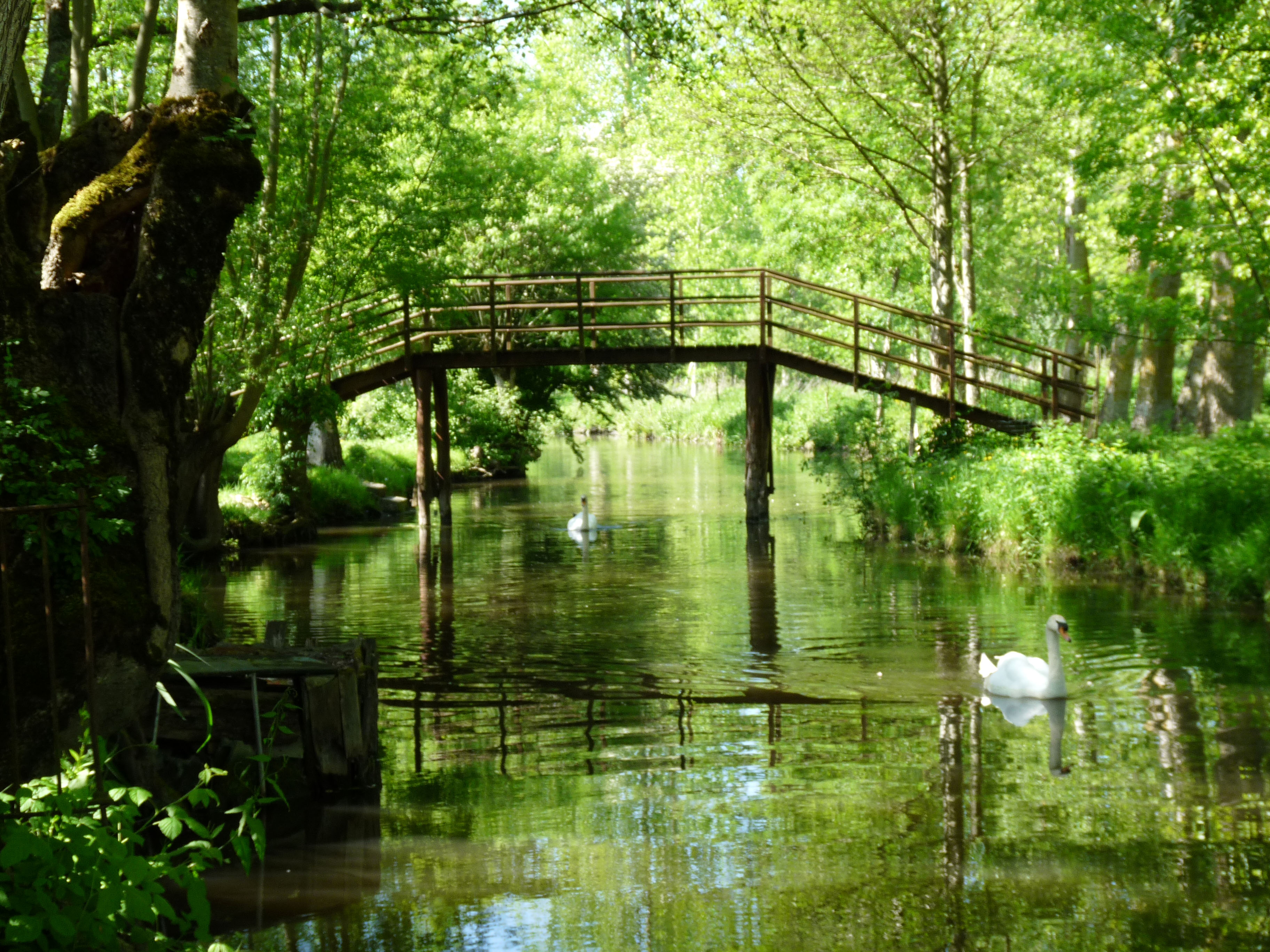
A footbridge over a canal in the Marais Poitevin in Le Vanneau.

== See also ==
- Communes of the Deux-Sèvres department
