= Magne (surname) =

Origin
- Meaning: "great"; or a reference to areas in France
- Region of origin: France

Magne or Magné is a French language surname. Its origin is ambiguous, either derived from the Scandinavian language given name Magnus (meaning "great"), or a locational surname from "Magné" in Deux-Sèvres and Vienne.

Magne is found in the compound name of the Frankish ruler Charlemagne, "Carolus Magnus" in Latin, "Charles the Great" in English.

People with the surname include:

- Antonin Magne (1904–1983), French cyclist
- Frédéric Magné (born 1969), French track cyclist
- Olivier Magne (born 1973), French rugby union footballer
- Xavier Magne, French Navy officer

== See also ==
- Magne (given name)
- Magne (disambiguation)
