= Thys, Wallonia =

Thys
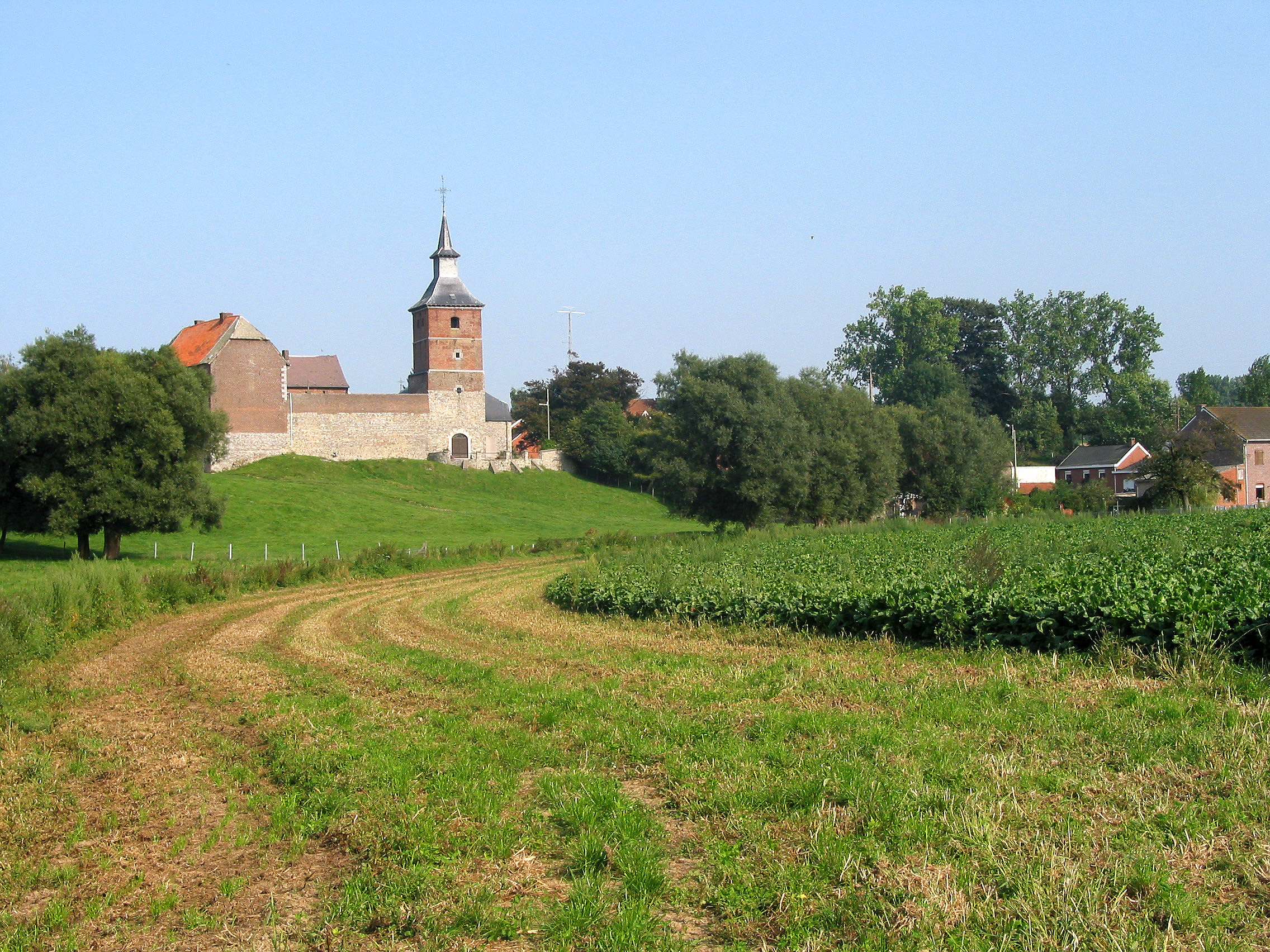
- Thys, view of the church and the fortified farm

- Location within Belgium Location within Europe
- Coordinates: 50°43′22″N 05°23′24″E
- Country: Belgium
- Region: Wallonia
- Province: Liège
- Municipality: Crisnée

Thys (Walloon: Tisse) is a locality in Wallonia and a district of the municipality of Crisnée, located in the province of Liège, Belgium.

The site of the village has been settled for more than 2,000 years. During the Middle Ages, the village was subordinated to the Prince-Bishop of Liège, but also contained a castle which was the seat of the local lord. In June 1703, the Duke of Marlborough used the castle as his headquarters. The castle, later devolved into a fortified farm, still exists in the centre of the village. The oldest parts of the village church dates from the 12th century. The entire centre of the village is a registered heritage site since 1993.
