= Château de Mursay =

Ruined 16th-century castle in the Deux-Sèvres département of France

Coordinates: 46°22′37″N 0°28′13″W

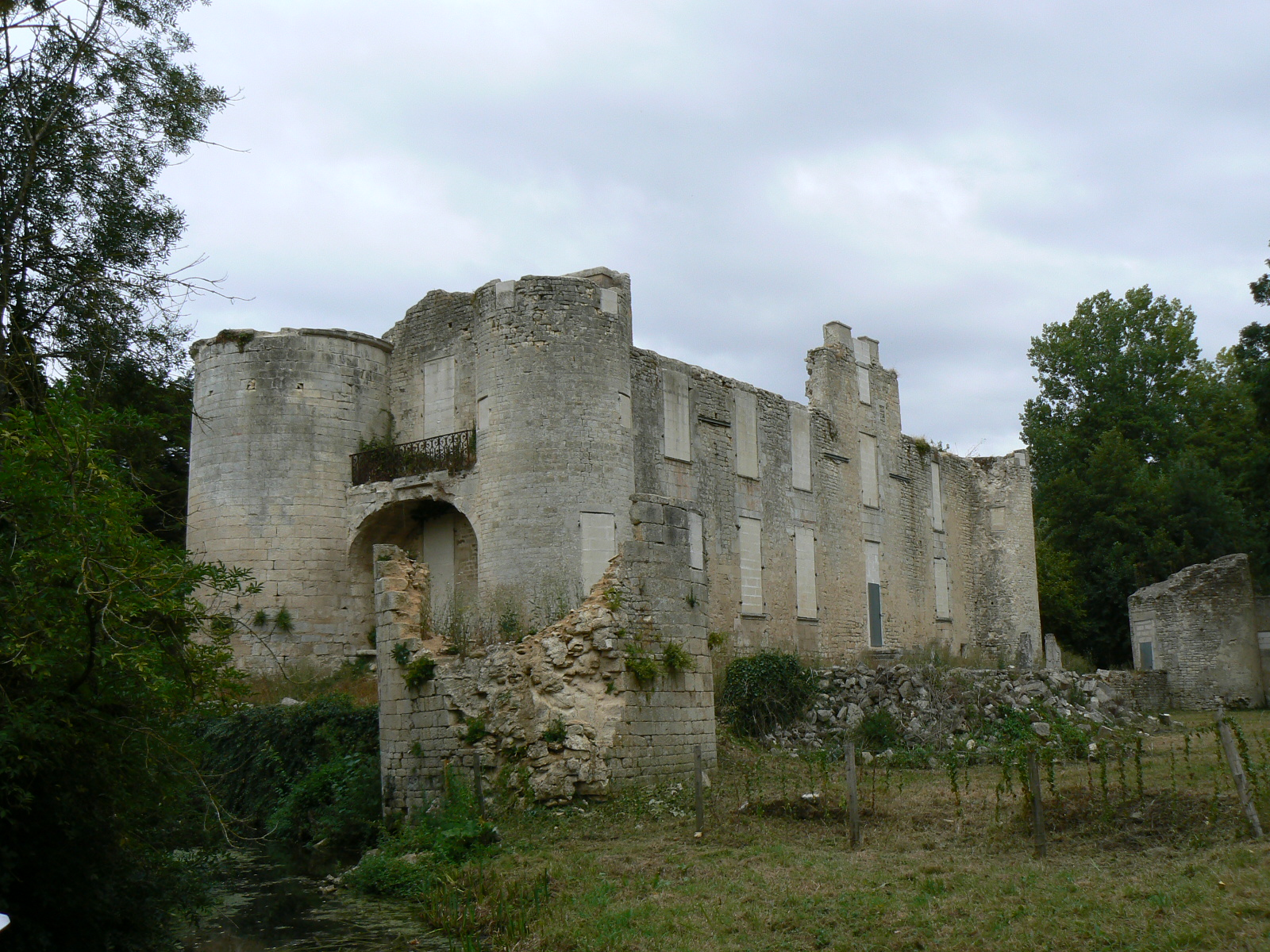
The ruin of Château de Mursay

The Château de Mursay is a ruined 16th-century castle in the commune of Échiré, 10 km north of Niort in the Deux-Sèvres département of France.

The Château de Mursay was the residence of Agrippa d'Aubigné, grandfather of Madame de Maintenon (née Françoise d'Aubigné).

Situated on the banks of the Sèvre Niortaise river, the castle has been bought by the commune to avoid it falling into ruins, the roof having been lost some years ago.

It has been listed since 1952 as a monument historique by the French Ministry of Culture.

== See also ==
- List of castles in France
