= Saint-Romans-des-Champs =

- Commune
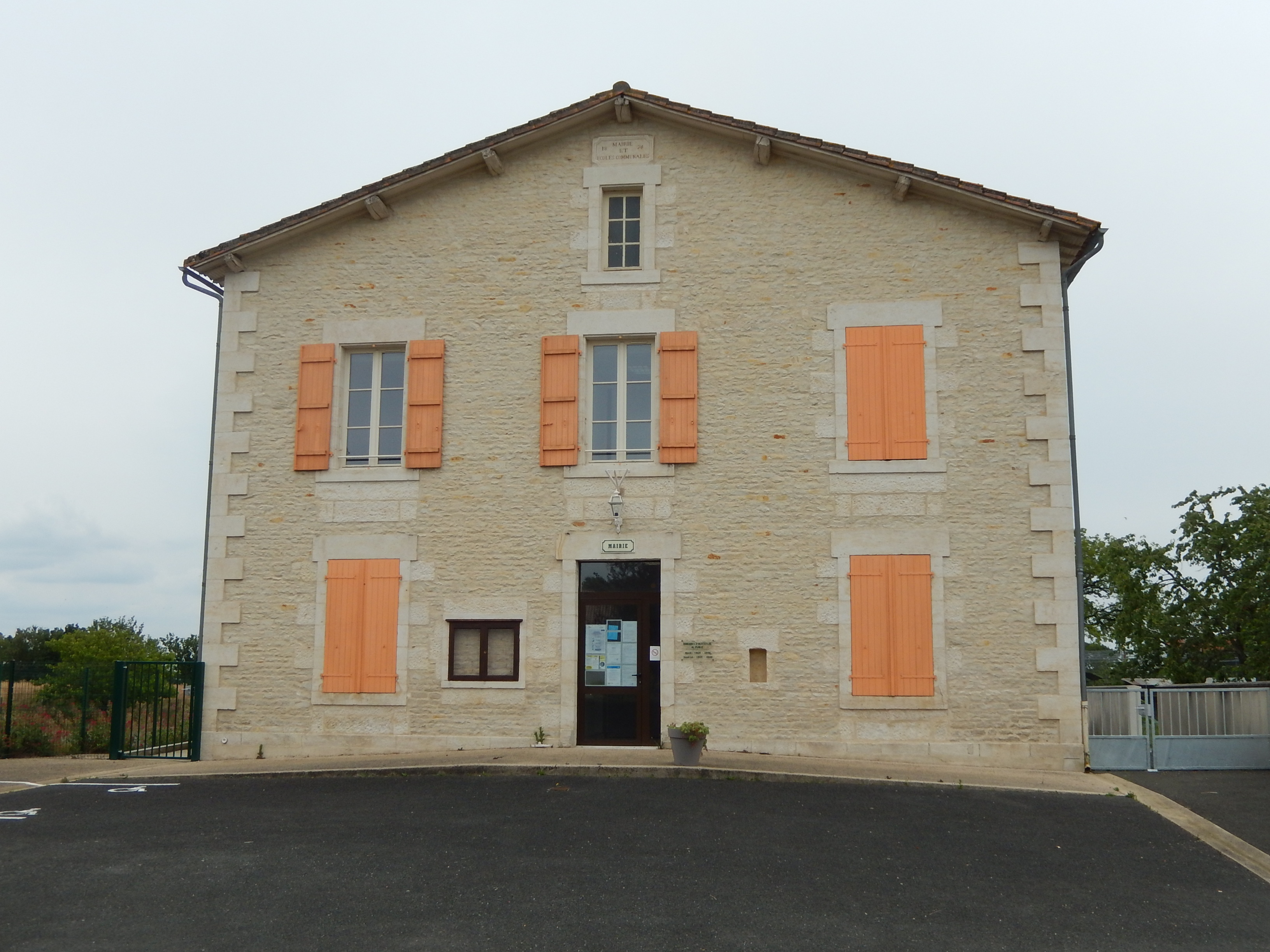
- Town hall
- Location of Saint-Romans-des-Champs
- Location within France Location within Nouvelle-Aquitaine
- Coordinates: 46°12′16″N 0°20′41″W
- Country: France
- Region: Nouvelle-Aquitaine
- Department: Deux-Sèvres
- Arrondissement: Niort
- Canton: La Plaine Niortaise
- Intercommunality: CA Niortais

Government
  - Mayor (2020–2026): Sophie Brossard
- Area^{1}: 4.10 km^{2} (1.58 sq mi)
- Elevation: 50 m (160 ft)
- Highest elevation: 76 m (249 ft)
- Lowest elevation: 54 m (177 ft)
- Population (2023): 169
  - Density: 41.2/km^{2} (107/sq mi)
- Time zone: UTC+01:00 (CET)
  - Summer (DST): UTC+02:00 (CEST)
- INSEE/Postal code: 79294 /79230
- ^{1} French Land Register data, which excludes lakes, ponds, glaciers > 1 km^{2} (0.386 sq mi or 247 acres) and river estuaries.

Saint-Romans-des-Champs is a commune in the Deux-Sèvres department in western France.

== Population ==
Historical population
Year	Pop.	±% p.a.
1968	215	—
1975	186	−2.05%
1982	161	−2.04%
1990	163	+0.15%
1999	169	+0.40%
2007	176	+0.51%
2012	180	+0.45%
2017	173	−0.79%
2023	169	−0.39%
Source: INSEE

== See also ==
- Communes of the Deux-Sèvres department
