= Communauté d'agglomération du Niortais =

Coordinates: 46°15′N 00°30′W

Niortais
- Communauté d'agglomération
- Country: France
- Region: Nouvelle-Aquitaine
- Department: Deux-Sèvres
- No. of communes: {{{nbcomm}}}
- Established: 2014
- Area: 815.4 km^{2} (314.8 sq mi)
- Population (2017): 120,733
  - Density: 148.1/km^{2} (383.5/sq mi)
- Website: www.niortagglo.fr

The Communauté d'agglomération du Niortais is the communauté d'agglomération, an intercommunal structure, centred on the city of Niort. It is located in the Deux-Sèvres department, in the Nouvelle-Aquitaine region, western France. It was created in January 2014 by the merger of the former Communauté d'agglomération de Niort with the former communauté de communes Plaine de Courances and the commune Germond-Rouvre. Its seat is in Niort. Its area is 815.4 km^{2}. Its population was 120,733 in 2017, with 58,707 residing in Niort proper.

== Composition ==
The communauté d'agglomération consists of the following 40 communes:

1. Aiffres
2. Amuré
3. Arçais
4. Beauvoir-sur-Niort
5. Bessines
6. Le Bourdet
7. Brûlain
8. Chauray
9. Coulon
10. Échiré
11. Épannes
12. Fors
13. La Foye-Monjault
14. Frontenay-Rohan-Rohan
15. Germond-Rouvre
16. Granzay-Gript
17. Juscorps
18. Magné
19. Marigny
20. Mauzé-sur-le-Mignon
21. Niort
22. Plaine-d'Argenson
23. Prahecq
24. Prin-Deyrançon
25. La Rochénard
26. Saint-Gelais
27. Saint-Georges-de-Rex
28. Saint-Hilaire-la-Palud
29. Saint-Martin-de-Bernegoue
30. Saint-Maxire
31. Saint-Rémy
32. Saint-Romans-des-Champs
33. Saint-Symphorien
34. Sansais
35. Sciecq
36. Val-du-Mignon
37. Vallans
38. Le Vanneau-Irleau
39. Villiers-en-Plaine
40. Vouillé
