= HSwMS Magne =

Several ships of the Swedish Navy have been named HSwMS Magne, named after Magni, the son of Thor in Norse mythology:

- HSwMS Magne (2) was a destroyer launched in 1905 and decommissioned in 1936
- HSwMS Magne (30) was a Mode-class destroyer launched in 1942 and decommissioned in 1966
- HSwMS Magne (P153) was a Hugin-class patrol boat launched in 1978 and decommissioned in 1995
