= Jean de Boyssières =

French poet

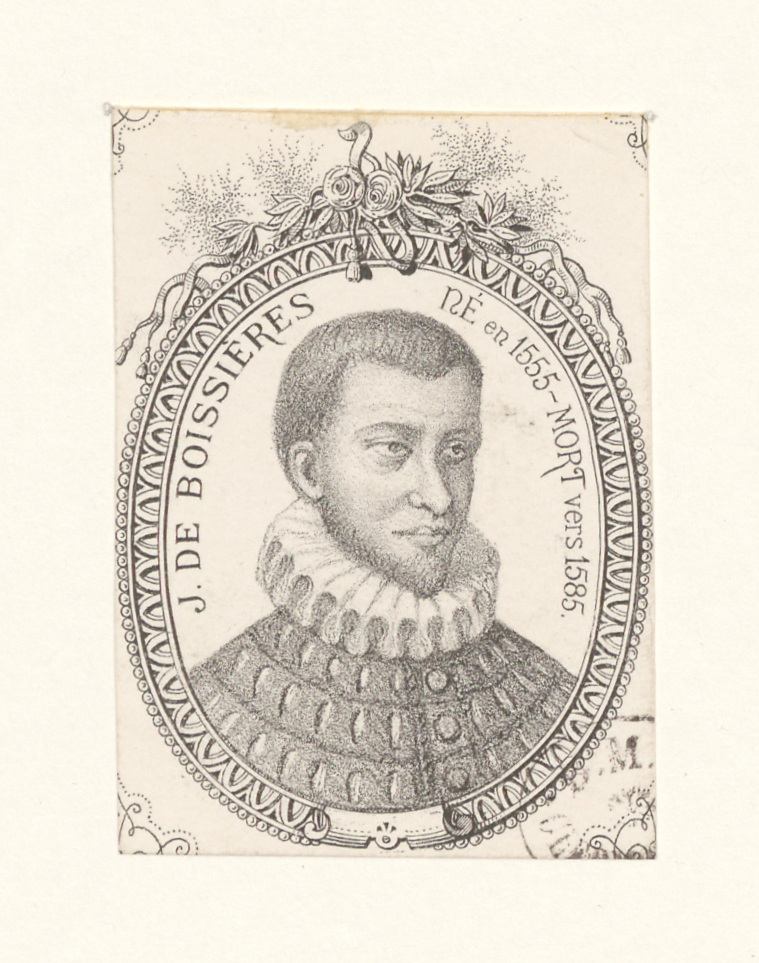

Jean de Boyssières (born 1555) was a French poet of the Renaissance.

Born at Clermont-Ferrand in 1555, Jean de Boyssières became a jurist. He dedicated most of his work to Francis, Duke of Anjou and Alençon.

== Bibliography ==
- The second poetic works of J. of Boyssières, Paris, J. Poupy, 1568
- Regrets and lamentations of very high-Princess Ysabel of Austriche, on the decease of Lady Mary, daughter of France, by J. of Boyssières, Paris, C. Montreuil, 1578
- The Seconds poetic works, Paris, 1578
- The Estrille and drug quereleux pedantic or regent of the college of Clermont in Auvergne, formerly Jester Kidneys in Champaigne. Epigrames with all the poets of that time françois against him, In Lyon, Loys Cloquemin, 1579
- The Third of works by Jean Boyssières, Lyon, L. Cloquemin, 1579
- The first works dating: Monsieur, the Duc d'Anjou, son of Jean de France Boyssières, Montferrandin, Paris, C. Montreuil, 1578
- The Troisiesmes Works [part 4], Paris, 1579
- Ariosto francoes Jean de Boessières, with argumans and allegories on each song (Track: Epistle to Francoés and advertissemant, J. Bouchet), the first volume (I-XII songs.), Lyon, T. Ancelin, 1580
- The crusade of John Boissières, Esquire Sieur de la Boissiere in Auvergne. A Mr. Berterand, advisor & advocate general of the king in his room in Paris commptes, Paris, Peter Sevestre, 1584
