= Canton of Frontenay-Rohan-Rohan =

Coordinates: 46.25°N 0.54°W

The canton of Frontenay-Rohan-Rohan is an administrative division of the Deux-Sèvres department, western France. Its borders were modified at the French canton reorganisation which came into effect in March 2015. Its seat is in Frontenay-Rohan-Rohan.

It consists of the following communes:

1. Amuré
2. Arçais
3. Bessines
4. Coulon
5. Épannes
6. Fors
7. Frontenay-Rohan-Rohan
8. Granzay-Gript
9. Magné
10. Saint-Symphorien
11. Sansais
12. Vallans
13. Le Vanneau-Irleau
