= Canton of La Plaine Niortaise =

Coordinates: 46.36°N 0.37°W

The canton of La Plaine Niortaise is an administrative division of the Deux-Sèvres department, western France. It was created at the French canton reorganisation which came into effect in March 2015. Its seat is in Chauray.

It consists of the following communes:

1. Aiffres
2. Brûlain
3. Chauray
4. Échiré
5. Juscorps
6. Prahecq
7. Saint-Gelais
8. Saint-Martin-de-Bernegoue
9. Saint-Romans-des-Champs
10. Vouillé
