= Geneviève Gaillard =

French Socialist Party politician and veterinarian

Geneviève Gaillard (born 13 May 1947, Niort, Deux-Sèvres), is a French politician, a member of the French Socialist Party, and former Mayor of Niort. Gaillard's initial career was as a veterinarian. She was the Socialist Party Deputy for Deux-Sèvres's 1st constituency from 1997 to 2017.

== Biography ==
Daughter of René Gaillard (1918–1985) who was also Mayor of Niort, Gaillard graduated from École nationale vétérinaire de Toulouse (National Veterinary School of Toulouse) in 1972, and obtained a DEA (post-graduate qualification) in microbe ecology in 1983. Her career as a veterinarian continued until 1989, when she became a City Councillor for Niort.

Gaillard was also vice-president of the French Socialist Party, charged with the environment and social policy. She is noted for her pro-environmental stance, and was part of the "Coppens commission" who prepared the French Charter for the Environment of 2004.

From 2008 to 2014, Gaillard was mayor of Niort.

== Selected publications ==
- Contribution à l'étude de la tetraploïdie obtenue par choc thermique et de la gynogénèse chez l'amphibien Pleurodèles waltii michah (Thesis) (in French). Toulouse. 1974. OCLC 492032442.
- Perrin-Gaillard, Geneviève; Duron, Philippe (1 May 2002). "Du zonage au contrat : une stratégie pour l'avenir. Rapport au Premier ministre" [From zoning to contract: a strategy for the future. Report to the Prime Minister]. La Documentation française, collection des rapports officiels (in French). France. ISBN 9782110049247. OCLC 51816367.
- Trade and traffic of dogs and cats, beings, objects from one market to moralize. Information report on the identification of dogs and cats, marketing and supply of COEs, National Assembly, Legislature XI, Commission of the production and trade, the collection documents of the National Assembly, 11–2002. ISSN 1240-831X
