= Magne (given name) =

- Gender: Male / Female

Origin
- Meaning: "mighty" or "fierce warrior"
- Region of origin: Norwegian

Magne is a Norwegian masculine given name of Norse origin, meaning "mighty" or "fierce warrior". In Norse mythology, Magni was the son of Thor. People with the name include:

- Magne Aarøen (1944–2003), Norwegian politician
- Magne Furuholmen (born 1962), Norwegian musician and visual artist
- Magne Havnå (1963–2004), Norwegian professional boxer
- Magne Hoseth (born 1980), Norwegian footballer
- Magne Johansen (born 1965), Norwegian ski jumper
- Magne Lerheim (1929–1994), Norwegian politician
- Magne Lystad (1932–1999), Norwegian orienteer
- Magne Myrmo (1943–2025), Norwegian cross-country skier
- Magne Skodvin (1915–2004), Norwegian historian
- Magne Sturød (born 1979), Norwegian footballer
- Magne Thomassen (born 1941), Norwegian speed skater

== See also ==
- Magne (surname)
