= Magné, Deux-Sèvres =

Magné
- Commune
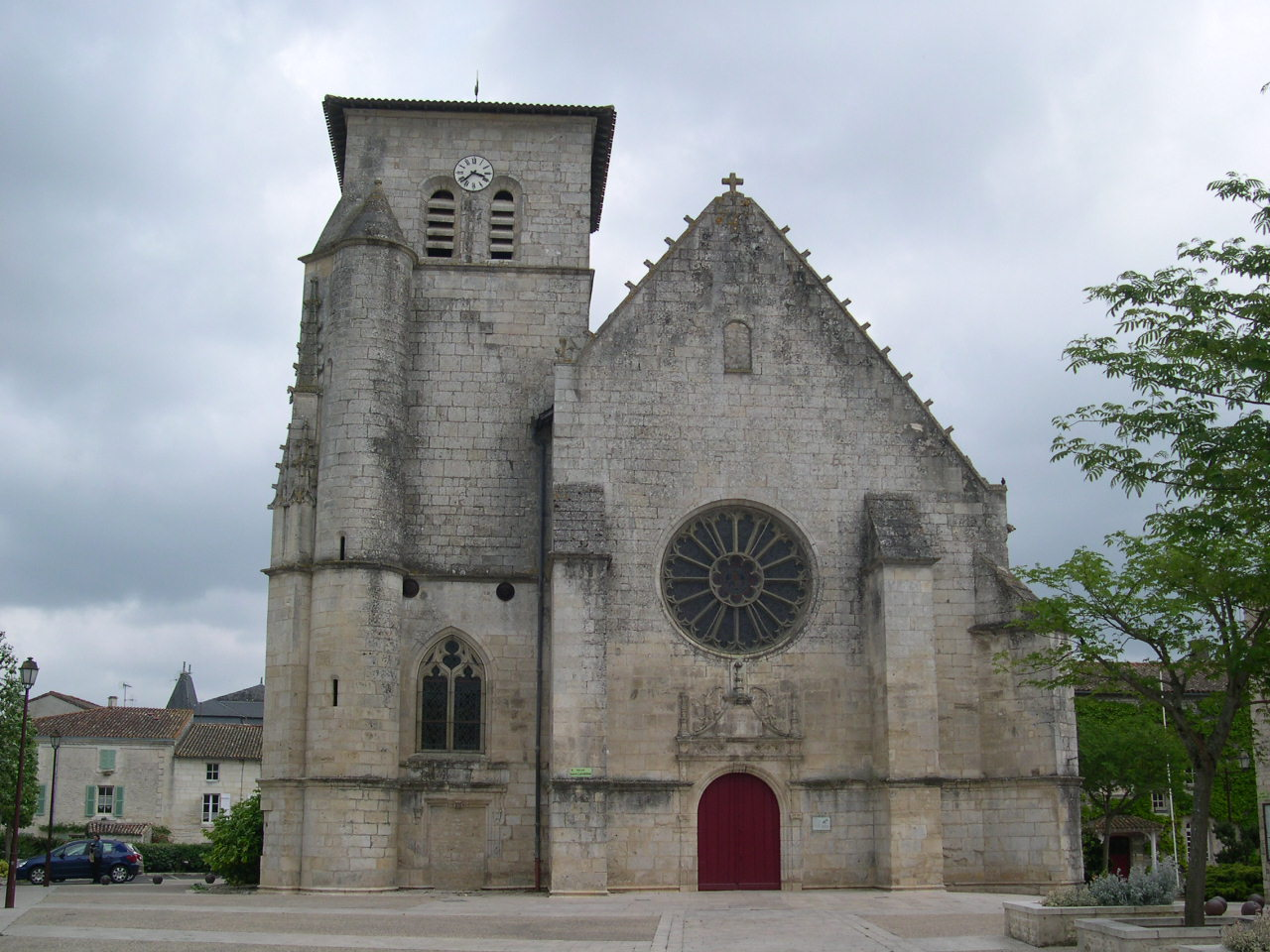
- The church in Magné
- Location of Magné
- Location within France Location within Nouvelle-Aquitaine
- Coordinates: 46°18′56″N 0°32′44″W
- Country: France
- Region: Nouvelle-Aquitaine
- Department: Deux-Sèvres
- Arrondissement: Niort
- Canton: Frontenay-Rohan-Rohan
- Intercommunality: CA Niortais

Government
  - Mayor (2020–2026): Gérard Laborderie
- Area^{1}: 14.80 km^{2} (5.71 sq mi)
- Elevation: 10 m (33 ft)
- Highest elevation: 39 m (128 ft)
- Lowest elevation: 0 m (0 ft)
- Population (2023): 2,728
  - Density: 184.3/km^{2} (477.4/sq mi)
- Time zone: UTC+01:00 (CET)
  - Summer (DST): UTC+02:00 (CEST)
- INSEE/Postal code: 79162 /79460
- ^{1} French Land Register data, which excludes lakes, ponds, glaciers > 1 km^{2} (0.386 sq mi or 247 acres) and river estuaries.

Magné (French pronunciation: [maɲe]) is a commune in the Deux-Sèvres department in western France.

== Population ==
Historical population
Year	Pop.	±% p.a.
1968	1,119	—
1975	1,435	+3.62%
1982	2,130	+5.80%
1990	2,717	+3.09%
1999	2,852	+0.54%
2007	2,886	+0.15%
2012	2,727	−1.13%
2017	2,671	−0.41%
2023	2,728	+0.35%
Source: INSEE

== See also ==
- Communes of the Deux-Sèvres department
