= Gourlay =

Gourlay is a surname from one of the Norman families living in Scotland, possibly from North or South Gorley (Hampshire) or an unidentified place in Normandy (France).

== Origins of the Gourlay ==
=== Earliest Renditions of the Word 'Gourlay' ===
The evolution of surnames often has complex historical roots, and many surnames have undergone various changes in spelling and pronunciation over the centuries. The variations 'de Gurlay' and 'de Gurley' may have arisen due to regional accents, dialects, or scribes recording names phonetically.

==== France ====
It is a possibility that the name developed from the surname Gournay with the earliest record sighted in the Belgic Gaul (Gallia Belgica) in Northern France where the Gournay-sur-Aronde is situated. There is a Lake Gourlay in Ontario, Canada, which historically had strong French Connection.

==== Scotland ====
The titles 'de Gurlay' and 'de Gurley' are recorded in Angus in the mid-13th century, implying that the name might have been associated with individuals or families in that area during that time.

Early medieval Scottish kings received aid from Norman knights, who were granted land in Scotland in recognition of their service to the crown. Gourlay is possibly a surname from these knights and seemed to arrive in Scotland in the 12th century. The earliest reference to the name is to a man known as Ingelram de Gourlay in Lothian. It is believed Ingelram de Gourlay accompanied William the Lion in 1174, and witnessed one of his charters circa 1200.

==== Ireland ====
In The Book of Irish Families Great and Small lists the original spelling as Mac Gourley and is associated with the county Antrim in the Northern Ireland. The name O'Gorley is also found in Ireland.

==== Original Location ====
Scottish etymologist, Professor Black, claimed that it originated from England. There is a place called Gorley in the county of Hampshire. The book Patronymica Britannica (1860) mentions that Gourlay is probably Norman. Gourlay is mentioned in the early records with the prefix 'de,' which indicates that it is likely a surname derived from a place name, although the specific location of this place remains unidentified. It is suggested that the origin could possibly be in Normandy or Picardy, which are regions in France. De Gournay could be the original 'Gourlay', however, the true origin is uncertain.

== The First Gourlays ==
=== Ownership of Land ===
Ingelramus de Gourlay came to Scotland with Prince William (a.k.a. William the Lion) in 1174, and received lands in Clydesdale and Lothian. He also possibly witnessed a charter with William. charter witness to Ingelram de Balliol of Redcastle (ANS) along with his brother, Iard de Gourlay among others.

His son Hugh possessed lands in Fife, and around 1190 witnessed a charter to Arbroath Abbey. Hugh and William Gurle attended a conference at Roxburgh in 1254. During the mid-13th century in Angus, there are historical records of the titles 'de Gurlay' and 'de Gurley'. In 1255, two brothers named Hugh and William Gurle were removal from the council of the King of Scotland.

William, the late William Gourlay's son and heir, donates to Newbattle Abbey in 1293. Adam de Gurle of Roxburghshire rendered homage in 1296. No fewer than eight members (William de Gurleye of Bagally, Roger Gourlay, William de Gurleye, Huwe de Gerleghe, Patrick de Gerleghe, Adam de Gurle of Roxburghe, Adam de Goerlay appears as witness at Roxburgh) also took the oaths to Edward I in 1296. This can be seen in the Ragman Roll of 1296, where there are references to several Gourlay lairds.

The Ragman Roll was a historical document created in the late 13th century and contains the names of Scottish nobles and landowners who pledged allegiance to King Edward I of England following his conquest of Scotland in 1296.)

Sir Patrick Gourlay, a clergyman, witnessed charters before 1320.

In the reign of David II, Adam Hepburn received lands in exchange for Hugh Gourlay of Beinston's forfeiture. David II had granted Simon de Gourlay charters for the coronerships of Fife, Adomstoun, and Caprounflatts in the county of Haddington. The Hailes lands were a part of the Earldom of Dunbar, and the Earls of Dunbar may have built the earliest portion of the castle, which dates to the likely 13th century. The Gourlay family took possession of the castle in the 14th century after the Earls granted them the lands. King David II ordered the Gourlays to forfeit their estate, and the Hepburns of Hailes and later Bothwell were given ownership of it. At the end of the fifteenth century, Alderston was still owned by the family. Lamelathen, close to Dundee, was also a Gourlay property at the time. Later, the Gourlays of Dargo, co. Forfar, prospered. In Dundee in the seventeenth century, people in positions of authority used this name. It appears that Robert, Provost of Stirling in 1330, left heirs both there and in Menteith, where they owned property in the seventeenth century. But it is in Fife that the head of the family remained, seated at Kincraig, which was a free barony holding of the Crown; Sir Thomas Gourlay of Kincraig registered arms 1672-78 — sable, an eagle displayed argent armed and beaked gules; and the same coat, with a difference, was allowed to James Gourlay, merchant in Dantzic.

As for the Gourlay family of Kincraig. In 1395, a member of the family was recorded as being 'of Kincraig'. By 1488, King James IV confirmed the lands of Kincraig to William Lundy (or Lundin), however the Lundins held only half of the lands of Kincraig, while the other half remained in the possession of the Gourlays. The Gourlays continued to hold part of the lands as late as 1895. This suggests that the division of the property persisted over the centuries with the Gourlay-held half of Kincraig as the "sunny half" in 1684.

The estate descended to heirs female, Gertrude Gourlay, who died in 1908, and her sister Susan, who live in Bath.

== Coat of Arms ==
Eagle Design for Gourlay Coat of Arms

The Erthe or Airth arms are described as having a silver shield with a black chief. As a result, one might assume that a silver shield featuring a red orle and three black martlets in the chief would symbolize the Gourlay family. However, it is worth noting that in the 16th century, the actual arms associated with the Gourlays were different, featuring a silver shield with three red martlets. On the other hand, the arms with a red orle and three black martlets in the chief were attributed to the Rutherford family.

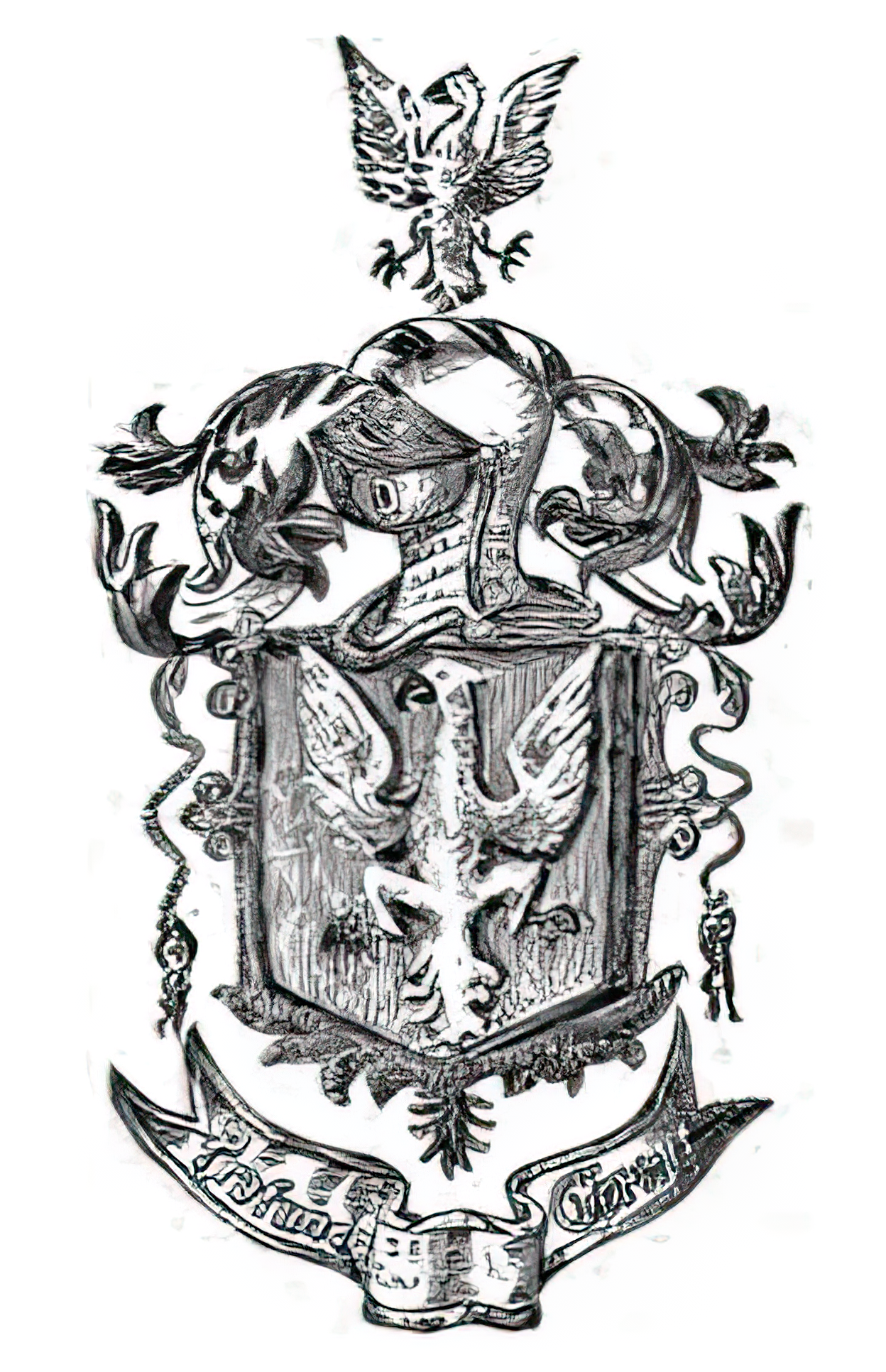
Coat of Arms from Albert E Gurley

Sir D. Lyndsay and Sir J. Balfour donate an argent shield bearing three martlets gules to Gourlay of Kincraig. The coat of Gourlay of Kincraig, was registered c. 1672 for Sir Thomas, is sable, an eagle displayed argent, which appears in K. two eagles argent armed and beaked gules was granted in 1865 to the Rev. William E. C. Austin-Gourlay of Kincraig, co. Fife, as representative of this baronial family. There was another variant seen with three martlets gules. Another coat is found in some MS. — an eagle surmounted of a bend gules charged with three crescents; but this is the bearing of a branch of the Ramsay.

Arms: Black, a silver double-headed eagle displayed, armed and beaked red.

Crest: A silver demi eagle displayed, antted and red beaked.

Motto: Profunda cernit. Directly translated from Latin, it means 'He sees deep'. Some translate it as 'He comprehends profound things'.

John Gourlay of Kincraig, son of Simon de Gourlay of Kincraig; His seal from 1444 displays an eagle with outstretched wings, which could possibly be a reference to his Bickerton ancestors.

As time passed, the Gourlay family's arms evolved. In one instance, they are described as "gurllay: Argent, an eagle displayed sable". In another version, it is "gourlay of: Sable, a double-headed eagle displayed argent". However, there is no specific mention of Kincraig in these descriptions.

Contrasting accounts are found in Douglas' Baronage article on Gourlay of Kincraig, where the arms are linked to this particular branch of the family. Douglas describes the arms as "Sable, an eagle displayed argent, beaked and membered gules."

== Variations ==
Spelling variations of this family name include: Gourlay, Gourley, Gorlay, Gorley, Gurlay, Gurley, Gourlie, Gurle, Gurleghe, Golay, Gourlagh, Gurllay, Gowrlaw, Gurla, Gurlaw, Gwrla, Gwyrlay, Goirlay, Gouerlay. [Each of these were found through the various sources. Read References]

== Notable Gourlays ==
Notable people with the surname include:

- Andrew Gourlay, British conductor
- David Gourlay, Scottish bowls player
- Doug Gourlay (born 1929), politician in Manitoba, Canada
- Harry Gourlay (1916–1987), Scottish Labour Party politician
- Harry Gourlay (umpire) (1895–1970), New Zealand cricket umpire
- Helen Gourlay (born 1946), tennis player from Australia
- Ian Gourlay (1920–2013), British Royal Marines officer
- James Gourlay, British conductor and internationally renowned tuba soloist
- Janet Gourlay (1863–1912), Scottish Egyptologist
- Jimmy Gourlay, Scottish footballer
- John Gourlay (soccer) (1872–1949), Canadian amateur soccer player
- John Gourlay (Scottish footballer) (1879 – unknown), a Scottish footballer
- Molly Gourlay (1898–1990), British golfer who won several international championships
- Robert Gourlay (merchant) 16th-century Scottish merchant and Customar of Edinburgh
- Robert Fleming Gourlay (1778–1863), writer, moderate reformer and agriculturalist
- Ron Gourlay, the Chief Executive of Chelsea Football Club from 2009
- Scott Gourlay (born 1971), Scottish cricketer
- William Gourlay Blair (1890–1957), politician and physician

== See also ==
- Gourlay Brothers & Co., a shipbuilding company and shipyard in Dundee, Scotland
- Gourlay Peninsula, ice-free peninsula forming the southeast extremity of Signy Island in the South Orkney Islands
- Gourlay Point, the southernmost of three finger-like points which form the southeast end of Signy Island in the South Orkney Islands
