= Hervé Joulain =

French horn player (born 1966)

Hervé Joulain (born 1966) is a French horn player.

== Biography ==
Born in Saint-Romans-lès-Melle (Deux-Sèvres), Joulain was Premier French horn super-soloist of the Orchestre philharmonique de Radio France under the direction of Marek Janowski. From the age of 20, Joulain played under the direction of Leonard Bernstein, Zubin Mehta, Daniel Barenboim, Pierre Boulez, Lorin Maazel, Armin Jordan, Seiji Ozawa, Riccardo Muti, Carlo Maria Giulini. Ten years later, he was promoted to the same position at the Orchestre national de France conducted by Charles Dutoit. Today, he has joined Lorin Maazel as first horn at the Filarmonica Toscanini in Parme.

Joulain is also a member of the wind octet of the Opéra Bastille with whom he regularly travels abroad. He has already recorded about twenty CDs.

His career as a chamber musician also led him to perform with Paul Tortelier, Yuri Bashmet, Pierre Amoyal, Vadim Repin, Michel Dalberto, Boris Berezovsky, Boris Belkin, Pinchas Zukerman, Natalia Gutman, Gidon Kremer, in France and abroad.

After teaching at the Conservatoire de Paris, Joulain now devotes himself to master classes throughout France as well as in Brazil, the Czech Republic, Canada and Finland.
