= Loubillé =

- Commune
- Coat of arms
- Location of Loubillé
- Location within France Location within Nouvelle-Aquitaine
- Coordinates: 46°03′02″N 0°03′46″W
- Country: France
- Region: Nouvelle-Aquitaine
- Department: Deux-Sèvres
- Arrondissement: Niort
- Canton: Melle
- Intercommunality: Mellois en Poitou

Government
  - Mayor (2022–2026): Jean-Luc Point
- Area^{1}: 21.21 km^{2} (8.19 sq mi)
- Elevation: 96 m (315 ft)
- Highest elevation: 149 m (489 ft)
- Lowest elevation: 84 m (276 ft)
- Population (2023): 357
  - Density: 16.8/km^{2} (43.6/sq mi)
- Time zone: UTC+01:00 (CET)
  - Summer (DST): UTC+02:00 (CEST)
- INSEE/Postal code: 79154 /79110
- ^{1} French Land Register data, which excludes lakes, ponds, glaciers > 1 km^{2} (0.386 sq mi or 247 acres) and river estuaries.

Loubillé is a commune in the Deux-Sèvres department in western France.

Loubillé has few shops or commerce and is a mainly residential village. The closest main town is Chef-Boutonne some 10 km to the north.

== See also ==
- Communes of the Deux-Sèvres department
