= Caunay =

- Part of Sauzé-entre-Bois
- Location of Caunay
- Location within France Location within Nouvelle-Aquitaine
- Coordinates: 46°12′01″N 0°05′26″E
- Country: France
- Region: Nouvelle-Aquitaine
- Department: Deux-Sèvres
- Arrondissement: Niort
- Canton: Melle
- Commune: Sauzé-entre-Bois
- Area^{1}: 14.42 km^{2} (5.57 sq mi)
- Elevation: 153 m (502 ft)
- Highest elevation: 155 m (509 ft)
- Lowest elevation: 128 m (420 ft)
- Population (2022): 176
  - Density: 12.2/km^{2} (31.6/sq mi)
- Time zone: UTC+01:00 (CET)
  - Summer (DST): UTC+02:00 (CEST)
- Postal code: 79190
- ^{1} French Land Register data, which excludes lakes, ponds, glaciers > 1 km^{2} (0.386 sq mi or 247 acres) and river estuaries.

Caunay (French pronunciation: [konɛ]) is a former commune in the Deux-Sèvres department in the Nouvelle-Aquitaine region in western France. On 1 January 2025, it was merged into the new commune of Sauzé-entre-Bois.

== See also ==
- Communes of the Deux-Sèvres department
