= Aubigné =

Aubigné may refer to:

- Agrippa d'Aubigné (1552–1630), a French poet
- Constant d'Aubigné (1585–1647), a French nobleman
- Françoise d'Aubigné, marquise de Maintenon (1635–1719), the second wife of Louis XIV
- Jean-Henri Merle d'Aubigné (1794–1872), a Swiss Protestant minister and historian of the Reformation

Aubigné may also refer to the following places in France:

- Aubigné, Ille-et-Vilaine
- Aubigné, Deux-Sèvres
- Aubigné-Racan, Sarthe
- Aubigné-sur-Layon, Maine-et-Loire
