= La Bataille =

- Part of Chef-Boutonne
- Location of La Bataille
- Location within France Location within Nouvelle-Aquitaine
- Coordinates: 46°05′13″N 0°06′26″W
- Country: France
- Region: Nouvelle-Aquitaine
- Department: Deux-Sèvres
- Arrondissement: Niort
- Canton: Melle
- Commune: Chef-Boutonne
- Area^{1}: 6.28 km^{2} (2.42 sq mi)
- Elevation: 120 m (390 ft)
- Highest elevation: 159 m (522 ft)
- Lowest elevation: 77 m (253 ft)
- Population (2022): 72
  - Density: 11/km^{2} (30/sq mi)
- Time zone: UTC+01:00 (CET)
  - Summer (DST): UTC+02:00 (CEST)
- Postal code: 79110
- ^{1} French Land Register data, which excludes lakes, ponds, glaciers > 1 km^{2} (0.386 sq mi or 247 acres) and river estuaries.

La Bataille (French pronunciation: [la bataj]) is a former commune in the Deux-Sèvres department in the Nouvelle-Aquitaine region in western France. On 1 January 2019, it was merged into the commune Chef-Boutonne.

== See also ==
- Communes of the Deux-Sèvres department
