= Crézières =

- Part of Chef-Boutonne
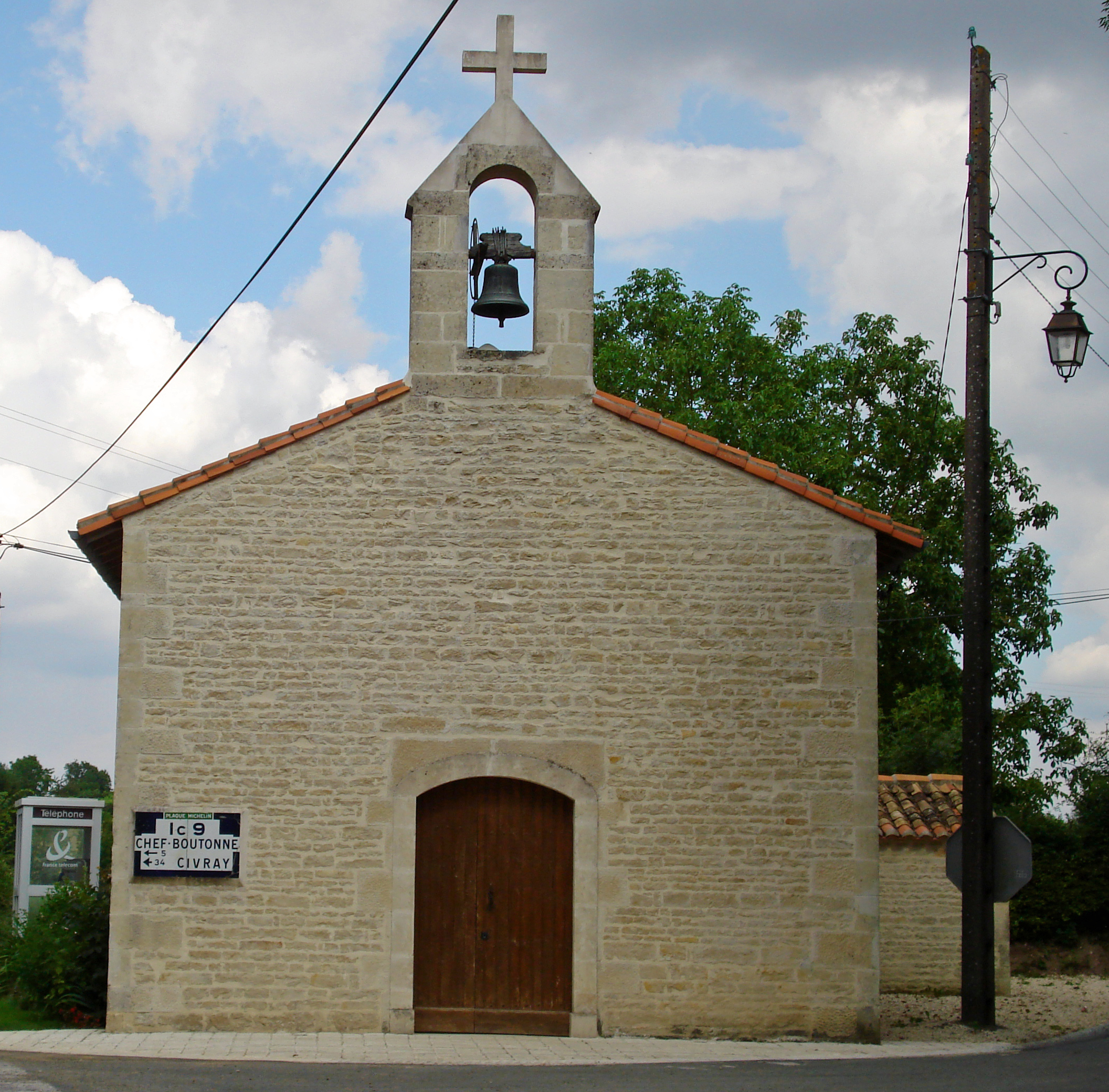
- The church in Crézières
- Location of Crézières
- Location within France Location within Nouvelle-Aquitaine
- Coordinates: 46°05′01″N 0°08′09″W
- Country: France
- Region: Nouvelle-Aquitaine
- Department: Deux-Sèvres
- Arrondissement: Niort
- Canton: Melle
- Commune: Chef-Boutonne
- Area^{1}: 4.25 km^{2} (1.64 sq mi)
- Elevation: 85 m (279 ft)
- Highest elevation: 149 m (489 ft)
- Lowest elevation: 96 m (315 ft)
- Population (2022): 38
  - Density: 8.9/km^{2} (23/sq mi)
- Time zone: UTC+01:00 (CET)
  - Summer (DST): UTC+02:00 (CEST)
- Postal code: 79110
- ^{1} French Land Register data, which excludes lakes, ponds, glaciers > 1 km^{2} (0.386 sq mi or 247 acres) and river estuaries.

Crézières (French pronunciation: [kʁezjɛʁ]) is a former commune in the Deux-Sèvres department in the Nouvelle-Aquitaine region in western France. On 1 January 2019, it was merged into the commune Chef-Boutonne.

== See also ==
- Communes of the Deux-Sèvres department
