= Pers, Deux-Sèvres =

Pers
- Part of Sauzé-entre-Bois
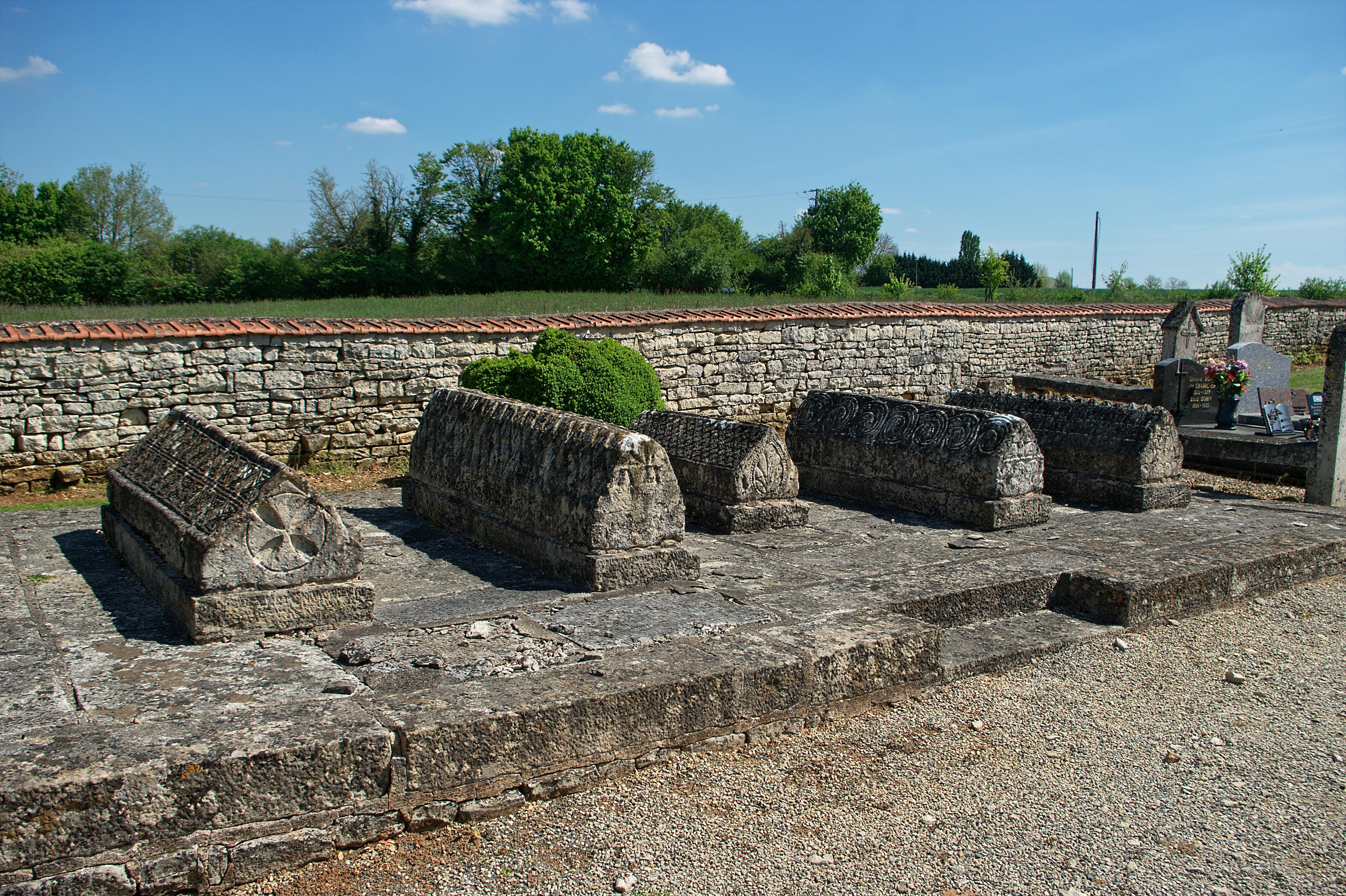
- 11th-12th century tombs in Pers
- Location of Pers
- Location within France Location within Nouvelle-Aquitaine
- Coordinates: 46°13′11″N 0°04′02″E
- Country: France
- Region: Nouvelle-Aquitaine
- Department: Deux-Sèvres
- Arrondissement: Niort
- Canton: Melle
- Commune: Sauzé-entre-Bois
- Area^{1}: 4.73 km^{2} (1.83 sq mi)
- Elevation: 151 m (495 ft)
- Highest elevation: 151 m (495 ft)
- Lowest elevation: 127 m (417 ft)
- Population (2022): 69
  - Density: 15/km^{2} (38/sq mi)
- Time zone: UTC+01:00 (CET)
  - Summer (DST): UTC+02:00 (CEST)
- Postal code: 79190
- ^{1} French Land Register data, which excludes lakes, ponds, glaciers > 1 km^{2} (0.386 sq mi or 247 acres) and river estuaries.

Pers is a former commune in the Deux-Sèvres department in western France. On 1 January 2025, it was merged into the new commune of Sauzé-entre-Bois.

== See also ==
- Communes of the Deux-Sèvres department
