= Sauze =

Sauze may refer to:

- Sauze (band), alternative/power metal band from Asturias, Spain
- Sauze, Alpes-Maritimes, commune in the Alpes-Maritimes department in southeastern France
- Sauze di Cesana, comune in the Metropolitan City of Turin, Piedmont, Italy
- Sauze d'Oulx, town and comune in the Metropolitan City of Turin, Piedmont, Italy
- Sauzé-Vaussais, commune in the Deux-Sèvres department in western France
