= Sompt =

- Part of Fontivillié
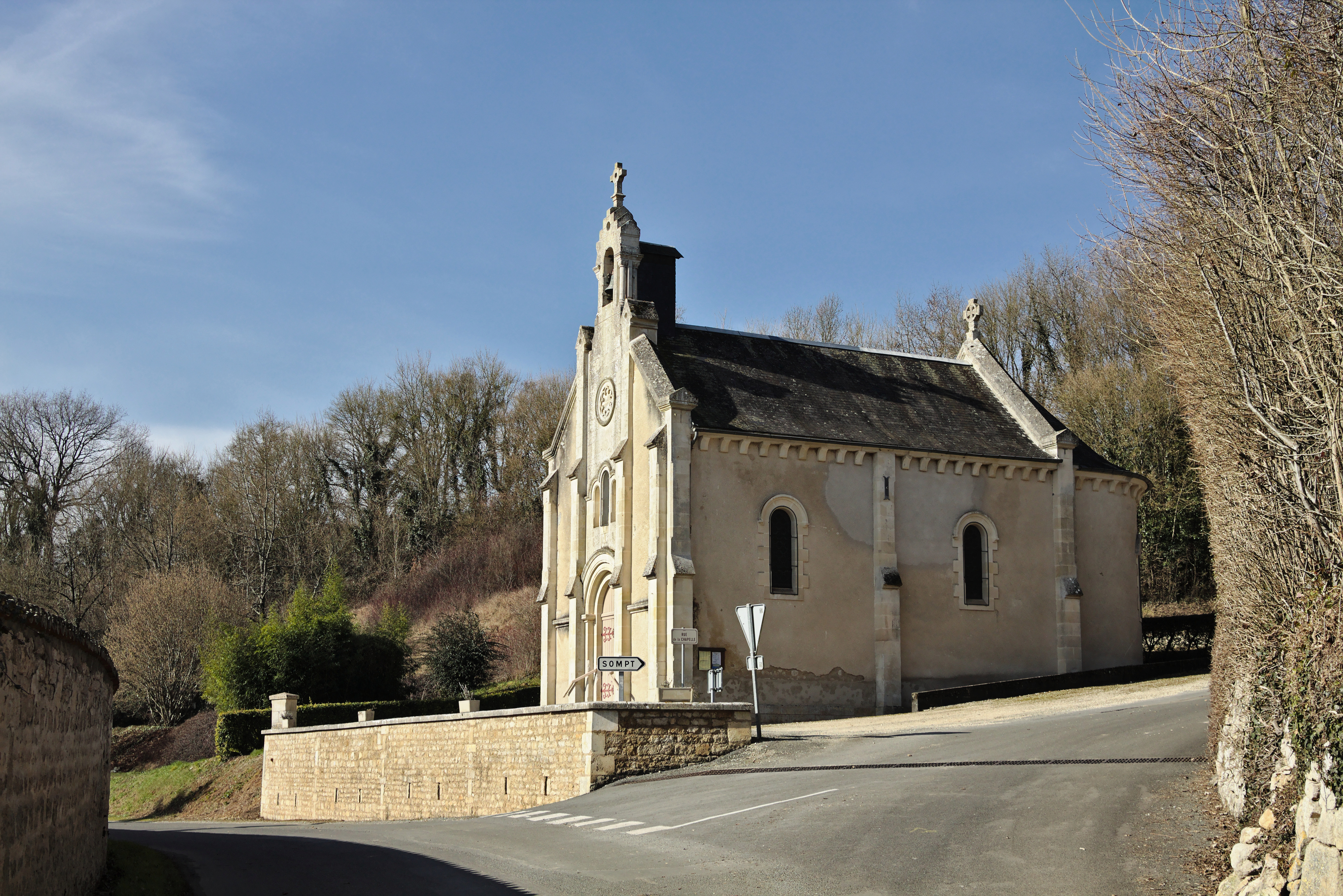
- The Chapel of Saint-Medard, in Sompt
- Location of Sompt
- Location within France Location within Nouvelle-Aquitaine
- Coordinates: 46°09′31″N 0°06′05″W
- Country: France
- Region: Nouvelle-Aquitaine
- Department: Deux-Sèvres
- Arrondissement: Niort
- Canton: Melle
- Commune: Fontivillié
- Area^{1}: 12.09 km^{2} (4.67 sq mi)
- Elevation: 151 m (495 ft)
- Highest elevation: 160 m (520 ft)
- Lowest elevation: 94 m (308 ft)
- Population (2022): 298
  - Density: 24.6/km^{2} (63.8/sq mi)
- Time zone: UTC+01:00 (CET)
  - Summer (DST): UTC+02:00 (CEST)
- Postal code: 79110
- ^{1} French Land Register data, which excludes lakes, ponds, glaciers > 1 km^{2} (0.386 sq mi or 247 acres) and river estuaries.

Sompt is a former commune in the Deux-Sèvres department in western France. On 1 January 2019, it was merged into the new commune Fontivillié.

== See also ==
- Communes of the Deux-Sèvres department
