= Pouffonds =

- Part of Marcillé
- Location of Pouffonds
- Location within France Location within Nouvelle-Aquitaine
- Coordinates: 46°12′20″N 0°06′41″W
- Country: France
- Region: Nouvelle-Aquitaine
- Department: Deux-Sèvres
- Arrondissement: Niort
- Canton: Melle
- Commune: Marcillé
- Area^{1}: 7.15 km^{2} (2.76 sq mi)
- Elevation: 130 m (430 ft)
- Highest elevation: 148 m (486 ft)
- Lowest elevation: 93 m (305 ft)
- Population (2017): 409
  - Density: 57.2/km^{2} (148/sq mi)
- Time zone: UTC+01:00 (CET)
  - Summer (DST): UTC+02:00 (CEST)
- Postal code: 79500
- ^{1} French Land Register data, which excludes lakes, ponds, glaciers > 1 km^{2} (0.386 sq mi or 247 acres) and river estuaries.

Pouffonds is a former commune in the Deux-Sèvres department in western France. On 1 January 2019, it was merged into the new commune Marcillé.

== See also ==
- Communes of the Deux-Sèvres department
