= Gourna =

Gourna may refer to:

- a dance performed by the Tupuri people of Cameroon and Chad
- Kurna or Gourna, three village areas located near the Theban Hills in Egypt

== See also ==
- Gournay (disambiguation)
