= Les Alleuds =

Les Alleuds may refer to the following places in France:

- Les Alleuds, Maine-et-Loire, a commune in the Maine-et-Loire department
- Les Alleuds, Deux-Sèvres, a commune in the Deux-Sèvres department
