= Saint-Génard =

- Part of Marcillé
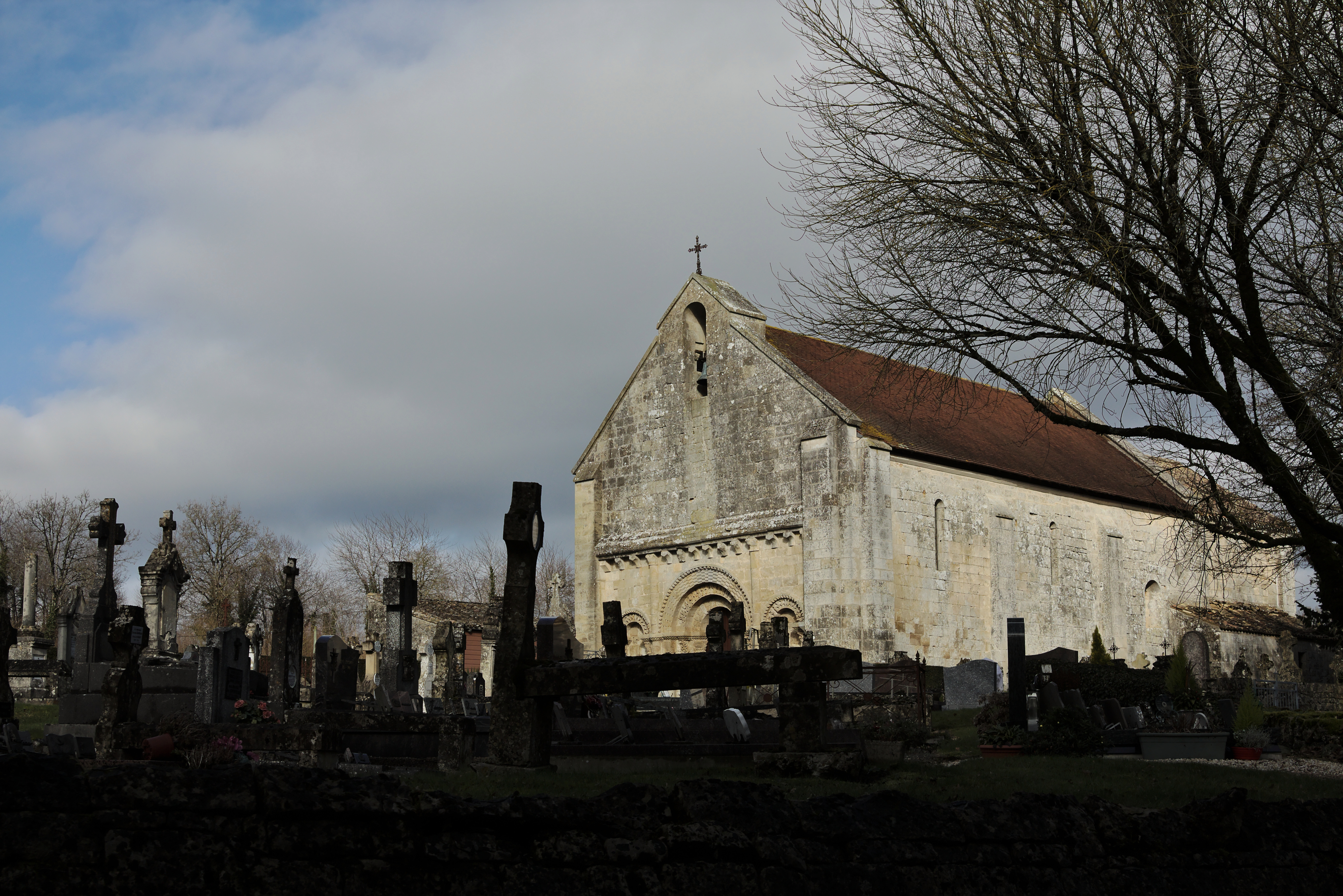
- The church in Saint-Génard
- Location of Saint-Génard
- Location within France Location within Nouvelle-Aquitaine
- Coordinates: 46°10′58″N 0°08′01″W
- Country: France
- Region: Nouvelle-Aquitaine
- Department: Deux-Sèvres
- Arrondissement: Niort
- Canton: Melle
- Commune: Marcillé
- Area^{1}: 11.07 km^{2} (4.27 sq mi)
- Elevation: 120 m (390 ft)
- Highest elevation: 138 m (453 ft)
- Lowest elevation: 84 m (276 ft)
- Population (2017): 351
  - Density: 31.7/km^{2} (82.1/sq mi)
- Time zone: UTC+01:00 (CET)
  - Summer (DST): UTC+02:00 (CEST)
- Postal code: 79500
- ^{1} French Land Register data, which excludes lakes, ponds, glaciers > 1 km^{2} (0.386 sq mi or 247 acres) and river estuaries.

Saint-Génard is a former commune in the Deux-Sèvres department in western France. On 1 January 2019, it was merged into the new commune Marcillé. The 20th-century French archaeologist Pierre de La Coste-Messelière (1894–1975) was born in Saint-Génard.

== See also ==
- Communes of the Deux-Sèvres department
