= Tillou =

- Part of Chef-Boutonne
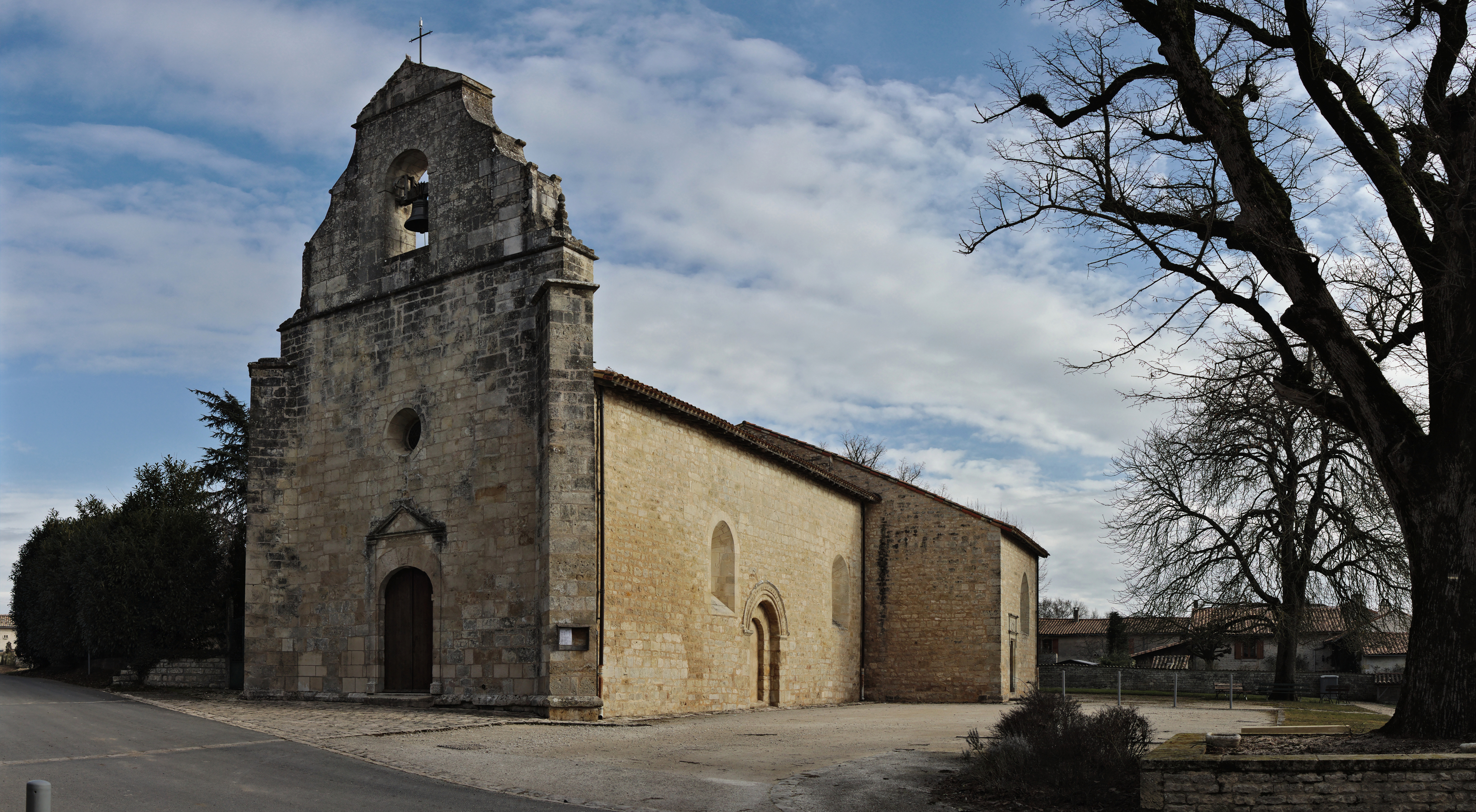
- The church of Saint-Sulpice, in Tillou
- Location of Tillou
- Location within France Location within Nouvelle-Aquitaine
- Coordinates: 46°09′06″N 0°07′14″W
- Country: France
- Region: Nouvelle-Aquitaine
- Department: Deux-Sèvres
- Arrondissement: Niort
- Canton: Melle
- Commune: Chef-Boutonne
- Area^{1}: 10.04 km^{2} (3.88 sq mi)
- Elevation: 112 m (367 ft)
- Highest elevation: 133 m (436 ft)
- Lowest elevation: 78 m (256 ft)
- Population (2022): 319
  - Density: 31.8/km^{2} (82.3/sq mi)
- Time zone: UTC+01:00 (CET)
  - Summer (DST): UTC+02:00 (CEST)
- Postal code: 79110
- ^{1} French Land Register data, which excludes lakes, ponds, glaciers > 1 km^{2} (0.386 sq mi or 247 acres) and river estuaries.

Tillou (French pronunciation: [tiju]) is a former commune in the Deux-Sèvres department in western France. On 1 January 2019, it was merged into the commune Chef-Boutonne.

== See also ==
- Communes of the Deux-Sèvres department
