= Montalembert =

Montalembert can refer to:

- André de Montalembert (1483–1553), French officer
- Marc René, marquis de Montalembert (1714–1800), French military engineer and writer
- Charles Forbes René de Montalembert (1810–1870), French publicist and historian
- Thibault de Montalembert (born 1962) French theatre, film and television actor
- Montalembert, Deux-Sèvres, a commune in the Deux-Sèvres department in France
