= Chail, Deux-Sèvres =

Chail
- Part of Fontivillié
- Location of Chail
- Location within France Location within Nouvelle-Aquitaine
- Coordinates: 46°12′39″N 0°05′23″W
- Country: France
- Region: Nouvelle-Aquitaine
- Department: Deux-Sèvres
- Arrondissement: Niort
- Canton: Melle
- Commune: Fontivillié
- Area^{1}: 12.6 km^{2} (4.9 sq mi)
- Elevation: 149 m (489 ft)
- Highest elevation: 177 m (581 ft)
- Lowest elevation: 124 m (407 ft)
- Population (2022): 466
  - Density: 37.0/km^{2} (95.8/sq mi)
- Time zone: UTC+01:00 (CET)
  - Summer (DST): UTC+02:00 (CEST)
- Postal code: 79500
- ^{1} French Land Register data, which excludes lakes, ponds, glaciers > 1 km^{2} (0.386 sq mi or 247 acres) and river estuaries.

Chail is a former commune in the Deux-Sèvres department in the Nouvelle-Aquitaine region in western France. On 1 January 2019, it was merged into the new commune Fontivillié.

== See also ==
- Communes of the Deux-Sèvres department
