= Gournay-Loizé =

- Part of Alloinay
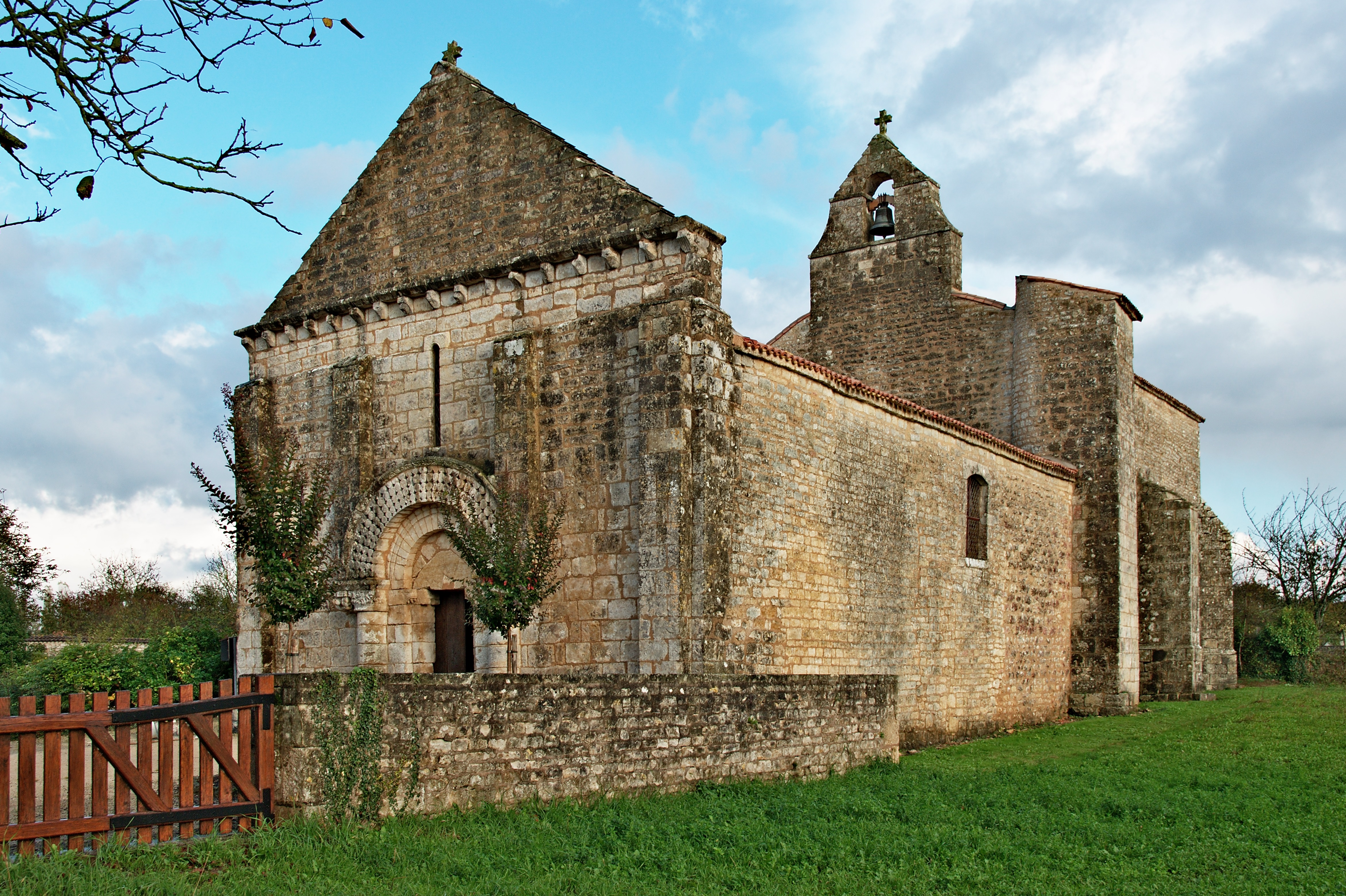
- The church of Saint-Pierre, in Loizé
- Location of Gournay-Loizé
- Location within France Location within Nouvelle-Aquitaine
- Coordinates: 46°07′59″N 0°02′14″W
- Country: France
- Region: Nouvelle-Aquitaine
- Department: Deux-Sèvres
- Arrondissement: Niort
- Canton: Melle
- Commune: Alloinay
- Area^{1}: 23.23 km^{2} (8.97 sq mi)
- Elevation: 169 m (554 ft)
- Highest elevation: 171 m (561 ft)
- Lowest elevation: 99 m (325 ft)
- Population (2014): 599
  - Density: 25.8/km^{2} (66.8/sq mi)
- Time zone: UTC+01:00 (CET)
  - Summer (DST): UTC+02:00 (CEST)
- Postal code: 79110
- ^{1} French Land Register data, which excludes lakes, ponds, glaciers > 1 km^{2} (0.386 sq mi or 247 acres) and river estuaries.

Gournay-Loizé (French pronunciation: [ɡuʁnɛ lwaze]) is a former commune in the Deux-Sèvres department in western France. On 1 January 2017, it was merged into the new commune Alloinay.

== See also ==
- Communes of the Deux-Sèvres department
