= Alloinay =

- Commune
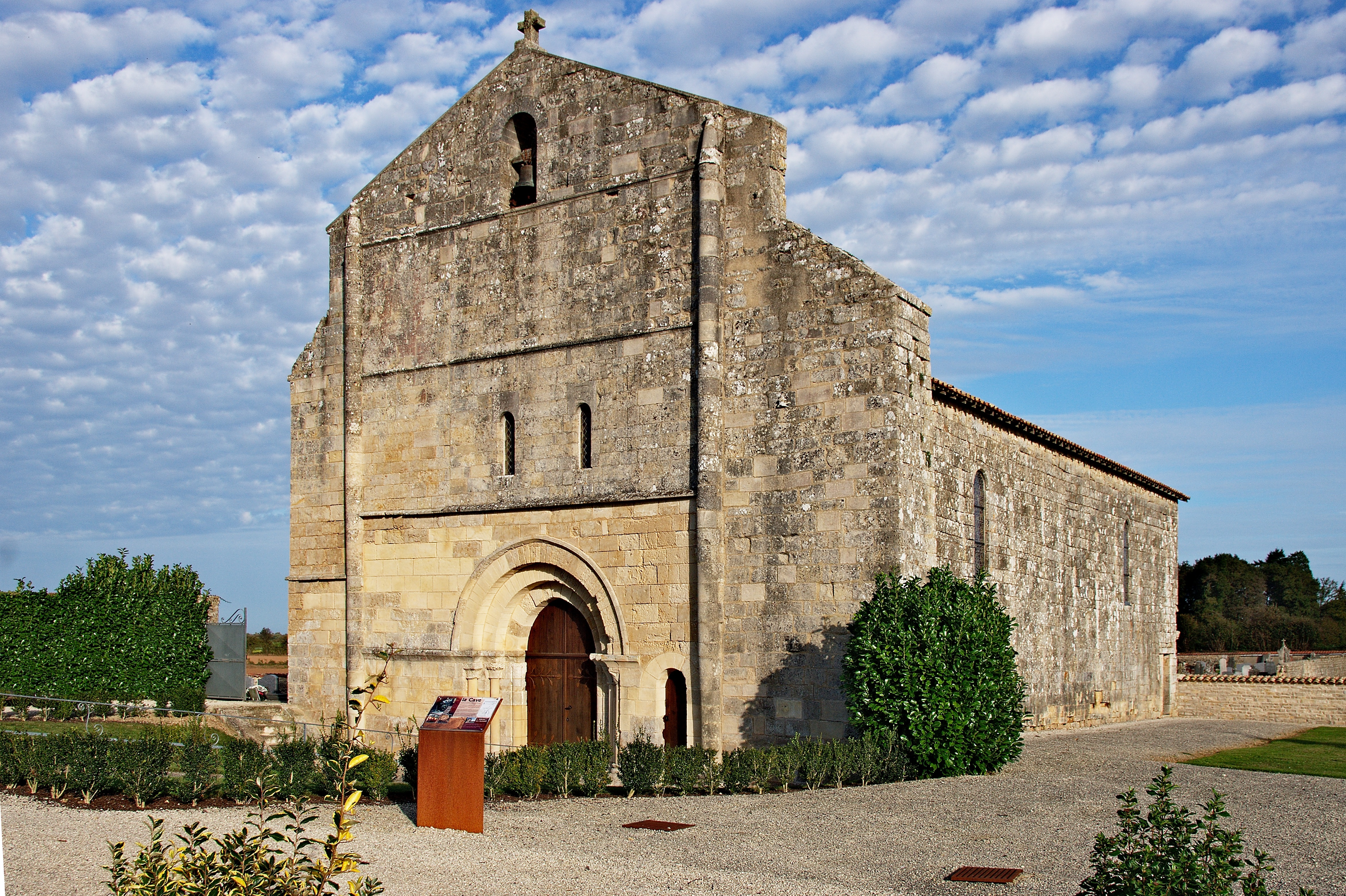
- The church of Notre Dame in Les Alleuds
- Location of Alloinay
- Location within France Location within Nouvelle-Aquitaine
- Coordinates: 46°09′04″N 0°03′43″W
- Country: France
- Region: Nouvelle-Aquitaine
- Department: Deux-Sèvres
- Arrondissement: Niort
- Canton: Melle

Government
  - Mayor (2020–2026): Bernard Chartier
- Area^{1}: 32.38 km^{2} (12.50 sq mi)
- Population (2023): 914
  - Density: 28.2/km^{2} (73.1/sq mi)
- Time zone: UTC+01:00 (CET)
  - Summer (DST): UTC+02:00 (CEST)
- INSEE/Postal code: 79136 /79110, 79190
- ^{1} French Land Register data, which excludes lakes, ponds, glaciers > 1 km^{2} (0.386 sq mi or 247 acres) and river estuaries.

Alloinay (French pronunciation: [alwanɛ]) is a commune in the department of Deux-Sèvres, western France. The municipality was established on 1 January 2017 by merger of the former communes of Gournay-Loizé (the seat) and Les Alleuds.

== See also ==
- Communes of the Deux-Sèvres department
