= Marcillé =

- Commune
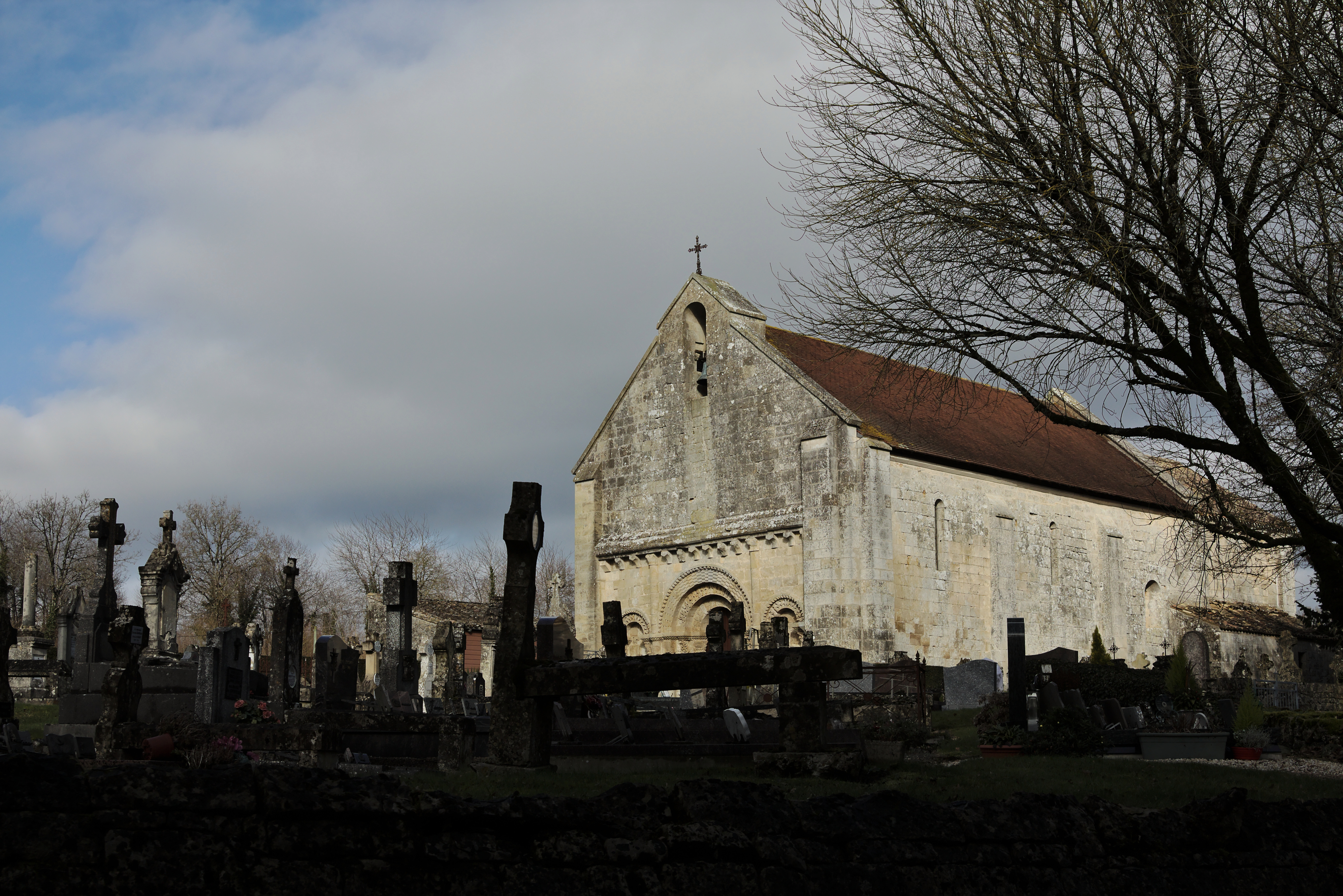
- The church in Saint-Génard
- Location of Marcillé
- Location within France Location within Nouvelle-Aquitaine
- Coordinates: 46°10′58″N 0°08′01″W
- Country: France
- Region: Nouvelle-Aquitaine
- Department: Deux-Sèvres
- Arrondissement: Niort
- Canton: Melle
- Intercommunality: Mellois-en-Poitou
- Area^{1}: 18.22 km^{2} (7.03 sq mi)
- Highest elevation: 148 m (486 ft)
- Lowest elevation: 84 m (276 ft)
- Population (2023): 725
  - Density: 39.8/km^{2} (103/sq mi)
- Time zone: UTC+01:00 (CET)
  - Summer (DST): UTC+02:00 (CEST)
- INSEE/Postal code: 79251 /79500
- ^{1} French Land Register data, which excludes lakes, ponds, glaciers > 1 km^{2} (0.386 sq mi or 247 acres) and river estuaries.

Marcillé is a commune in the Deux-Sèvres department in western France. It was established on 1 January 2019 by merger of the former communes of Saint-Génard (the seat) and Pouffonds.

== See also ==
- Communes of the Deux-Sèvres department
