= Fontenille-Saint-Martin-d'Entraigues =

- Commune
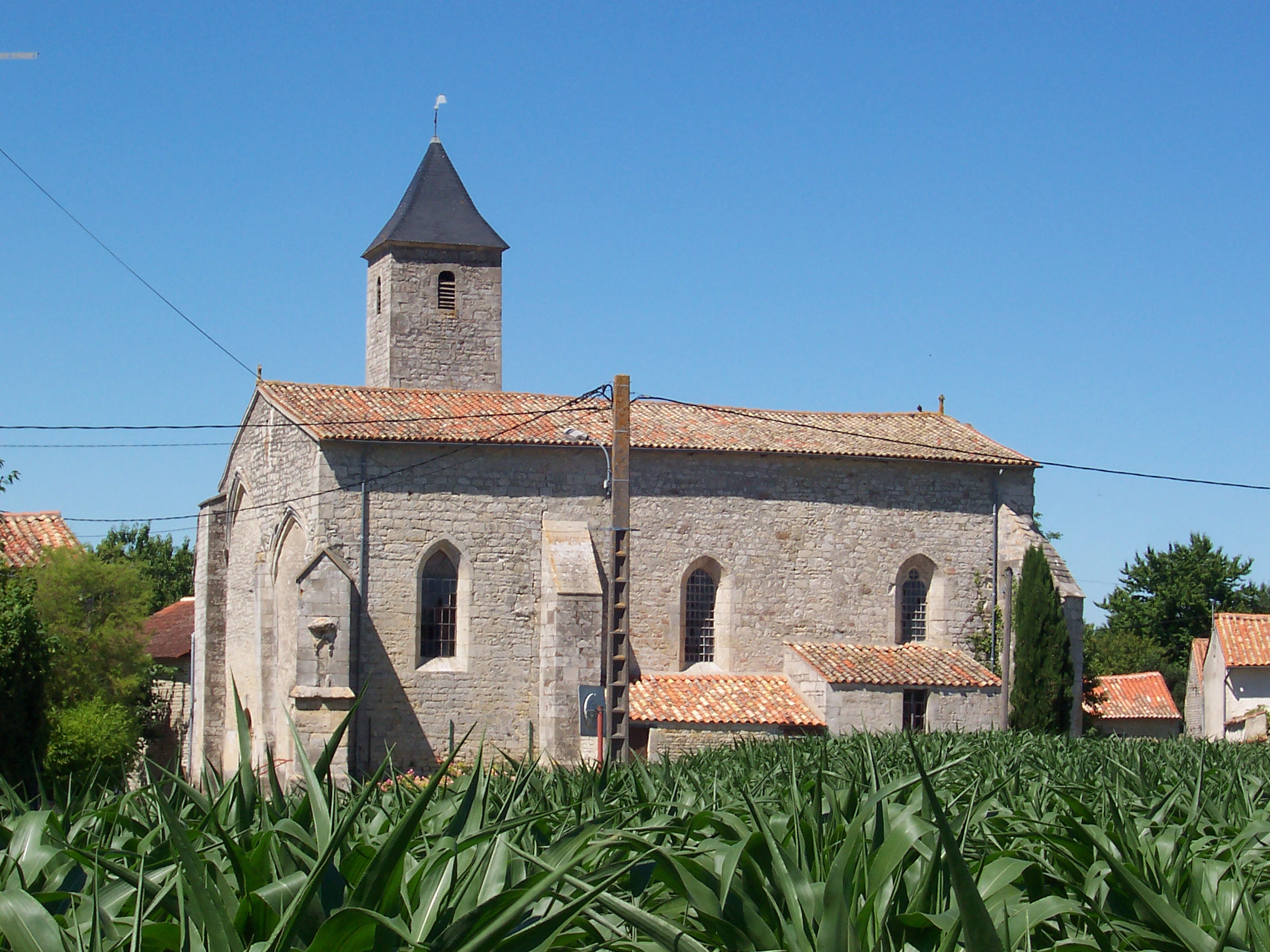
- The church of Saint-Martin-d'Entraigues
- Location of Fontenille-Saint-Martin-d'Entraigues
- Location within France Location within Nouvelle-Aquitaine
- Coordinates: 46°07′28″N 0°07′50″W
- Country: France
- Region: Nouvelle-Aquitaine
- Department: Deux-Sèvres
- Arrondissement: Niort
- Canton: Melle

Government
  - Mayor (2020–2026): Gaëtan Delezay
- Area^{1}: 15.11 km^{2} (5.83 sq mi)
- Elevation: 74 m (243 ft)
- Highest elevation: 126 m (413 ft)
- Lowest elevation: 66 m (217 ft)
- Population (2023): 531
  - Density: 35.1/km^{2} (91.0/sq mi)
- Time zone: UTC+01:00 (CET)
  - Summer (DST): UTC+02:00 (CEST)
- INSEE/Postal code: 79122 /79110
- ^{1} French Land Register data, which excludes lakes, ponds, glaciers > 1 km^{2} (0.386 sq mi or 247 acres) and river estuaries.

Fontenille-Saint-Martin-d'Entraigues is a commune in the Deux-Sèvres department in the Nouvelle-Aquitaine region in western France. It was created in 1973 by the merger of two former communes: Fontenille and Saint-Martin-d'Entraigues.

== Geography ==
The main hamlets in the commune are located on the banks of the river Boutonne, which flows southwestward through the commune.

== See also ==
- Communes of the Deux-Sèvres department
