= Melleran =

- Commune
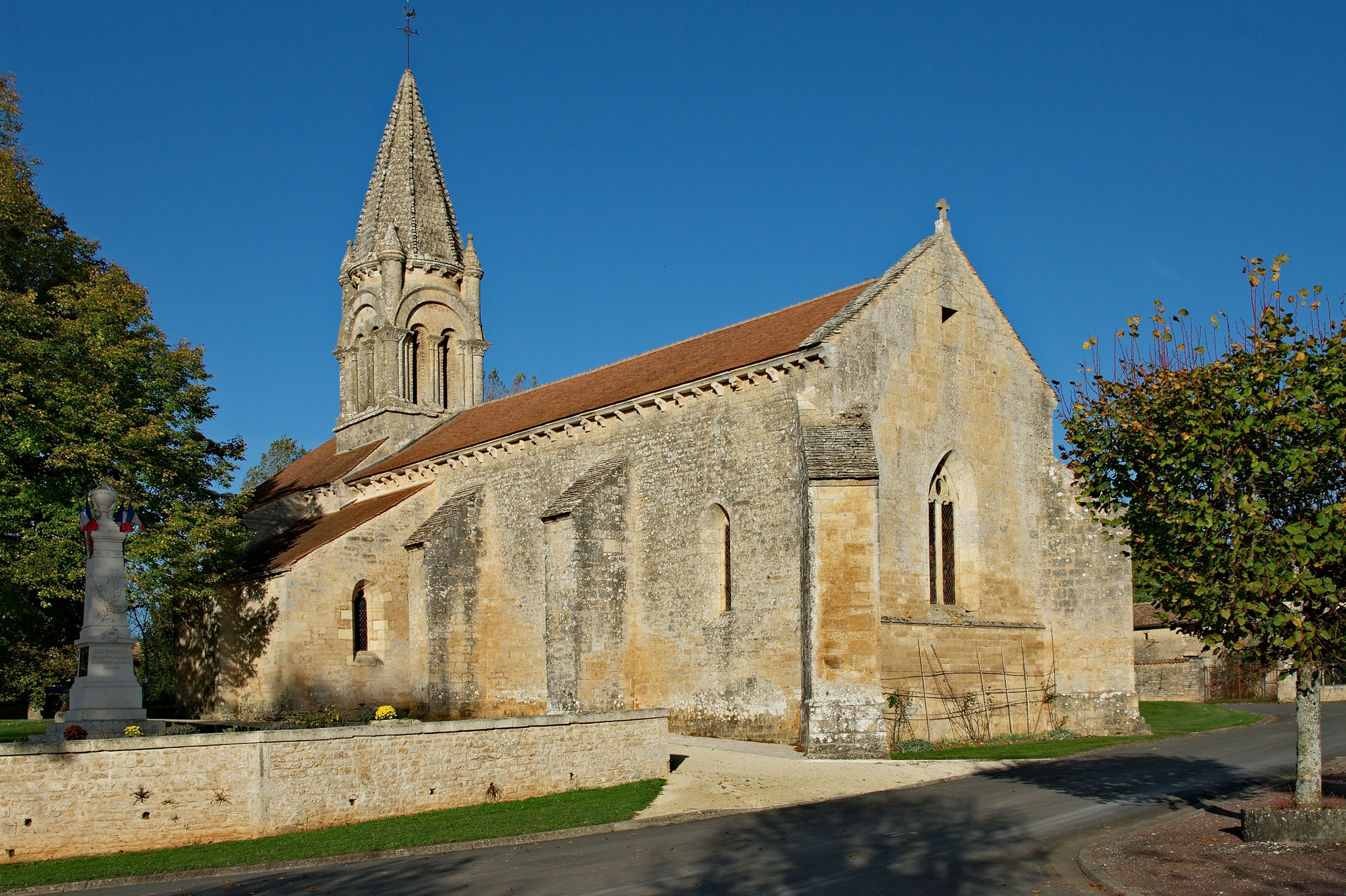
- The church of Our Lady, in Melleran
- Location of Melleran
- Location within France Location within Nouvelle-Aquitaine
- Coordinates: 46°07′56″N 0°00′08″E
- Country: France
- Region: Nouvelle-Aquitaine
- Department: Deux-Sèvres
- Arrondissement: Niort
- Canton: Melle

Government
  - Mayor (2020–2026): François Delaire
- Area^{1}: 19.90 km^{2} (7.68 sq mi)
- Elevation: 157 m (515 ft)
- Highest elevation: 169 m (554 ft)
- Lowest elevation: 130 m (430 ft)
- Population (2023): 480
  - Density: 24/km^{2} (62/sq mi)
- Time zone: UTC+01:00 (CET)
  - Summer (DST): UTC+02:00 (CEST)
- INSEE/Postal code: 79175 /79190
- ^{1} French Land Register data, which excludes lakes, ponds, glaciers > 1 km^{2} (0.386 sq mi or 247 acres) and river estuaries.

Melleran (French pronunciation: [mɛlʁɑ̃]) is a commune in the Deux-Sèvres department in western France.

== See also ==
- Communes of the Deux-Sèvres department
