= Fontivillié =

- Commune
- Location of Fontivillié
- Location within France Location within Nouvelle-Aquitaine
- Coordinates: 46°12′39″N 0°05′23″W
- Country: France
- Region: Nouvelle-Aquitaine
- Department: Deux-Sèvres
- Arrondissement: Niort
- Canton: Melle
- Intercommunality: Mellois-en-Poitou
- Area^{1}: 24.69 km^{2} (9.53 sq mi)
- Highest elevation: 177 m (581 ft)
- Lowest elevation: 94 m (308 ft)
- Population (2023): 754
  - Density: 30.5/km^{2} (79.1/sq mi)
- Time zone: UTC+01:00 (CET)
  - Summer (DST): UTC+02:00 (CEST)
- INSEE/Postal code: 79064 /79500
- ^{1} French Land Register data, which excludes lakes, ponds, glaciers > 1 km^{2} (0.386 sq mi or 247 acres) and river estuaries.

Fontivillié is a commune in the Deux-Sèvres department in the Nouvelle-Aquitaine region in western France. It was established on 1 January 2019 by merger of the former communes of Chail (the seat) and Sompt.

== See also ==
- Communes of the Deux-Sèvres department
