= Sauzé-Vaussais =

- Part of Sauzé-entre-Bois
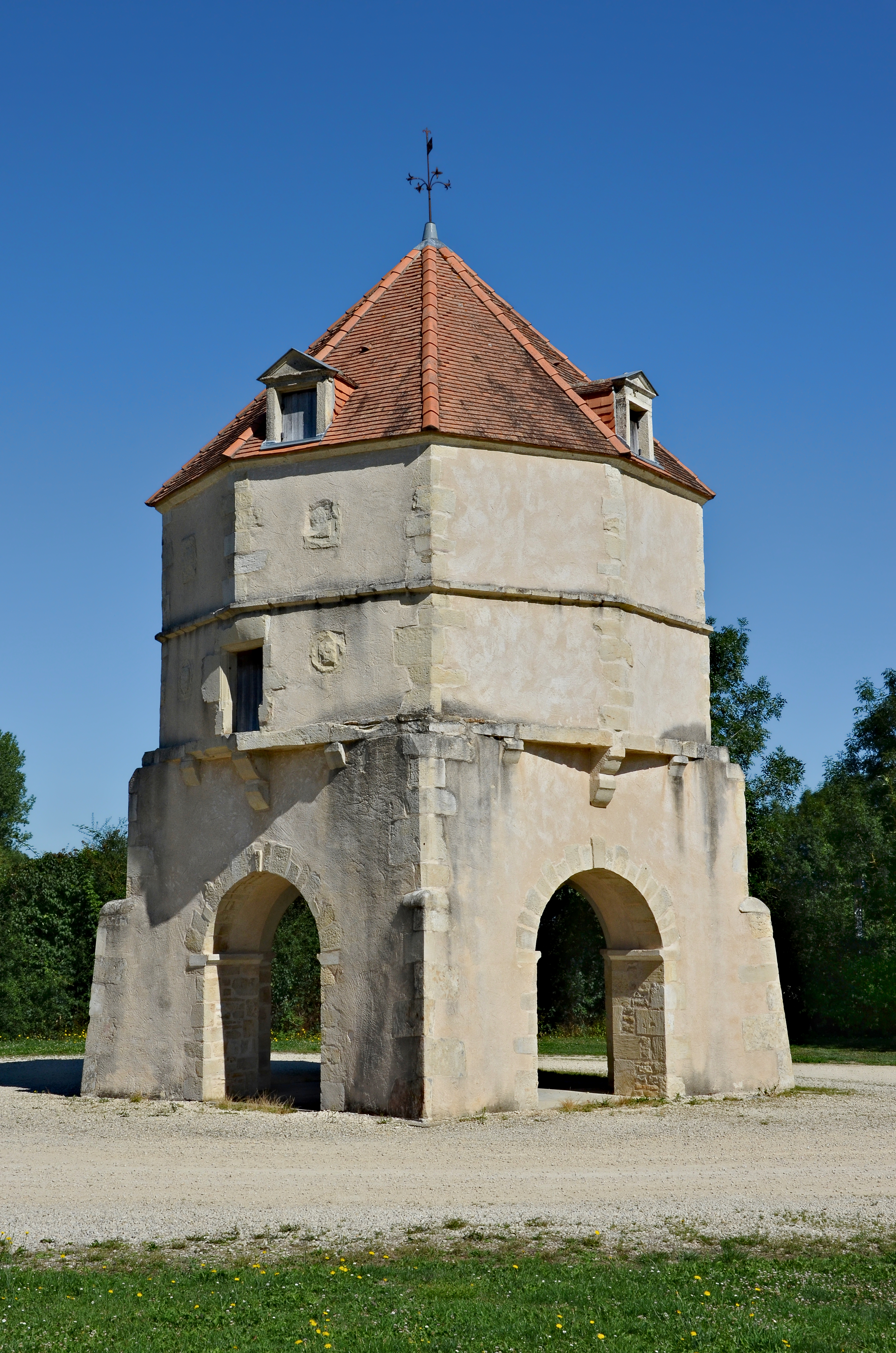
- Dovecote tower of the Royal Post

- Coat of arms
- Location of Sauzé-Vaussais
- Location within France Location within Nouvelle-Aquitaine
- Coordinates: 46°08′10″N 0°06′21″E
- Country: France
- Region: Nouvelle-Aquitaine
- Department: Deux-Sèvres
- Arrondissement: Niort
- Canton: Melle
- Commune: Sauzé-entre-Bois
- Area^{1}: 19.08 km^{2} (7.37 sq mi)
- Elevation: 114 m (374 ft)
- Highest elevation: 187 m (614 ft)
- Lowest elevation: 117 m (384 ft)
- Population (2022): 1,497
  - Density: 78.46/km^{2} (203.2/sq mi)
- Time zone: UTC+01:00 (CET)
  - Summer (DST): UTC+02:00 (CEST)
- Postal code: 79190
- ^{1} French Land Register data, which excludes lakes, ponds, glaciers > 1 km^{2} (0.386 sq mi or 247 acres) and river estuaries.

Sauzé-Vaussais (French pronunciation: [soze vosɛ]) is a former commune in the Deux-Sèvres department in western France. On 1 January 2025, it was merged into the new commune of Sauzé-entre-Bois. The surrounding area is strongly agricultural, with many business relating to agriculture and wood / forestry management. The weekly market is popular, with a range of stalls selling local produce. The market is visited by English stallholders, serving the local expat population.

The residents shorten its name to Sauzé. The area surrounding the village is a popular location for British expats, the village featuring an English speaking cafe and many local businesses.

== Features ==
Local features

Sauzé-Vaussais has an old town centre with a clock tower standing outside the town hall (mairie). It has a church with a high vaulted roof, several little bars (one with PMU)and other little shops, such as bakeries. Just outside the town is a supermarket, as well as a dovecote tower (pictured at right) with picnic tables and a water body nearby which is famous throughout the region as the "Plan d'eau de Sauzé".

Nearby features

Sauzé is an hour and a half's drive away from the beaches of La Rochelle and several small touristic islands such as Île-d'Aix, Île de Ré (Isle of Rhé), and the Fouras peninsula; popular summer locations for locals and tourists alike. Not far away, westward of Niort, starts the Poitevin Marsh, a large network of canals and rivers also known as the "Green Venice", for punting or cycling day trips. Also close, is the theme park and science park, the Futuroscope, in Poitiers.

== See also ==
- Communes of the Deux-Sèvres department
