= Sauzé-entre-Bois =

- Commune
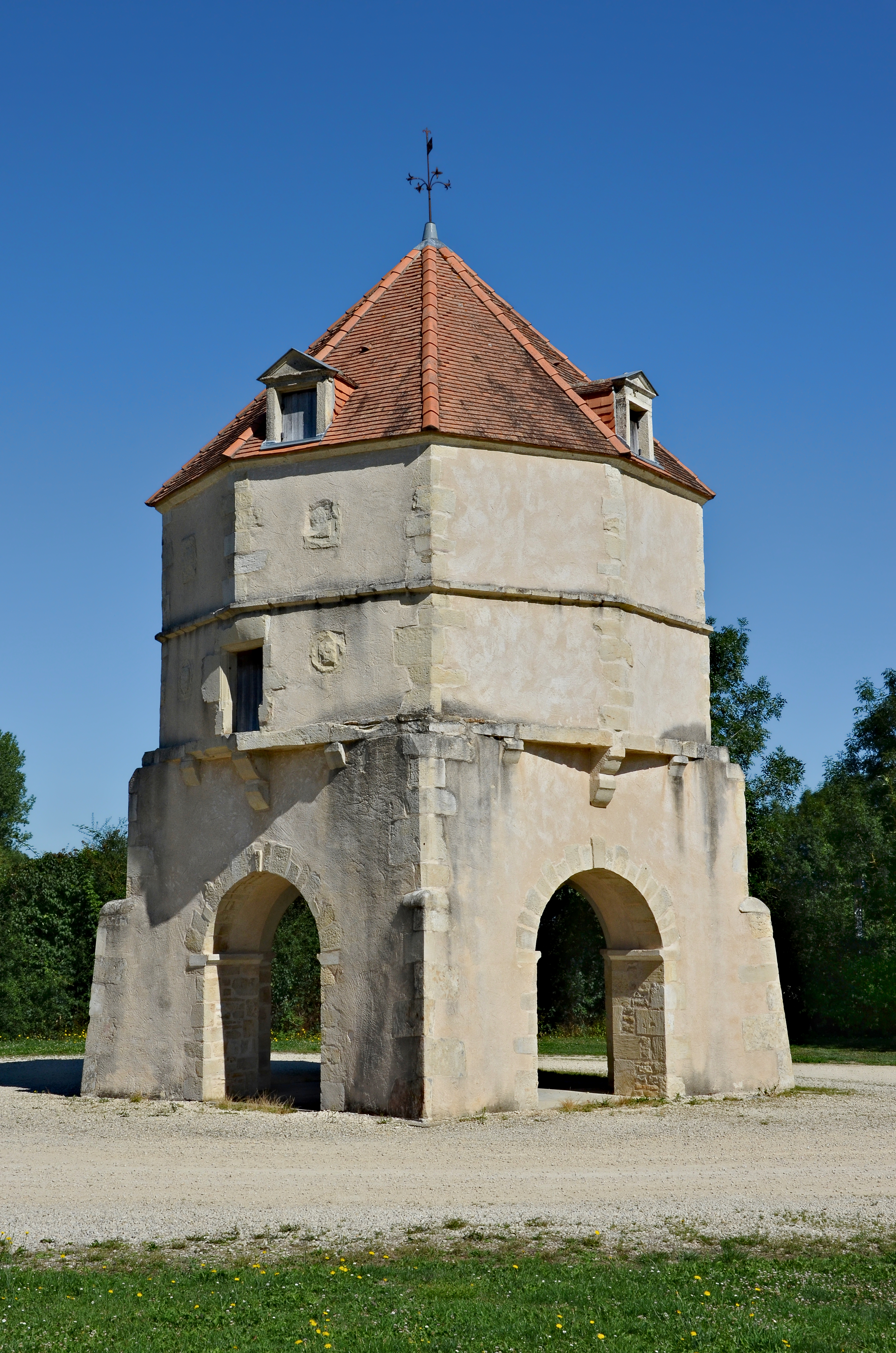
- Dovecote tower of the Royal Post
- Location of Sauzé-entre-Bois
- Location within France Location within Nouvelle-Aquitaine
- Coordinates: 46°08′10″N 0°06′21″E
- Country: France
- Region: Nouvelle-Aquitaine
- Department: Deux-Sèvres
- Arrondissement: Niort
- Canton: Melle
- Intercommunality: CC Mellois en Poitou

Government
  - Mayor (2025–2026): Nicolas Ragot
- Area^{1}: 65.32 km^{2} (25.22 sq mi)
- Highest elevation: 190 m (620 ft)
- Lowest elevation: 117 m (384 ft)
- Population (2023): 2,271
  - Density: 34.77/km^{2} (90.05/sq mi)
- Time zone: UTC+01:00 (CET)
  - Summer (DST): UTC+02:00 (CEST)
- INSEE/Postal code: 79307 /79190
- ^{1} French Land Register data, which excludes lakes, ponds, glaciers > 1 km^{2} (0.386 sq mi or 247 acres) and river estuaries.

Sauzé-entre-Bois (French pronunciation: [soze ɑ̃tʁ bwa]) is a commune in the Deux-Sèvres department in western France. It was formed on 1 January 2025, with the merger of Caunay, Montalembert, Pers, Pliboux and Sauzé-Vaussais.

== Population ==
Population data refer to the area corresponding with the commune as of January 2025.

Historical population
Year	Pop.	±% p.a.
1968	2,662	—
1975	2,664	+0.01%
1982	2,612	−0.28%
1990	2,565	−0.23%
1999	2,368	−0.88%
2007	2,331	−0.20%
2012	2,327	−0.03%
2017	2,359	+0.27%
2023	2,271	−0.63%
Source: INSEE

== See also ==
- Communes of the Deux-Sèvres department
