= Limalonges =

- Commune
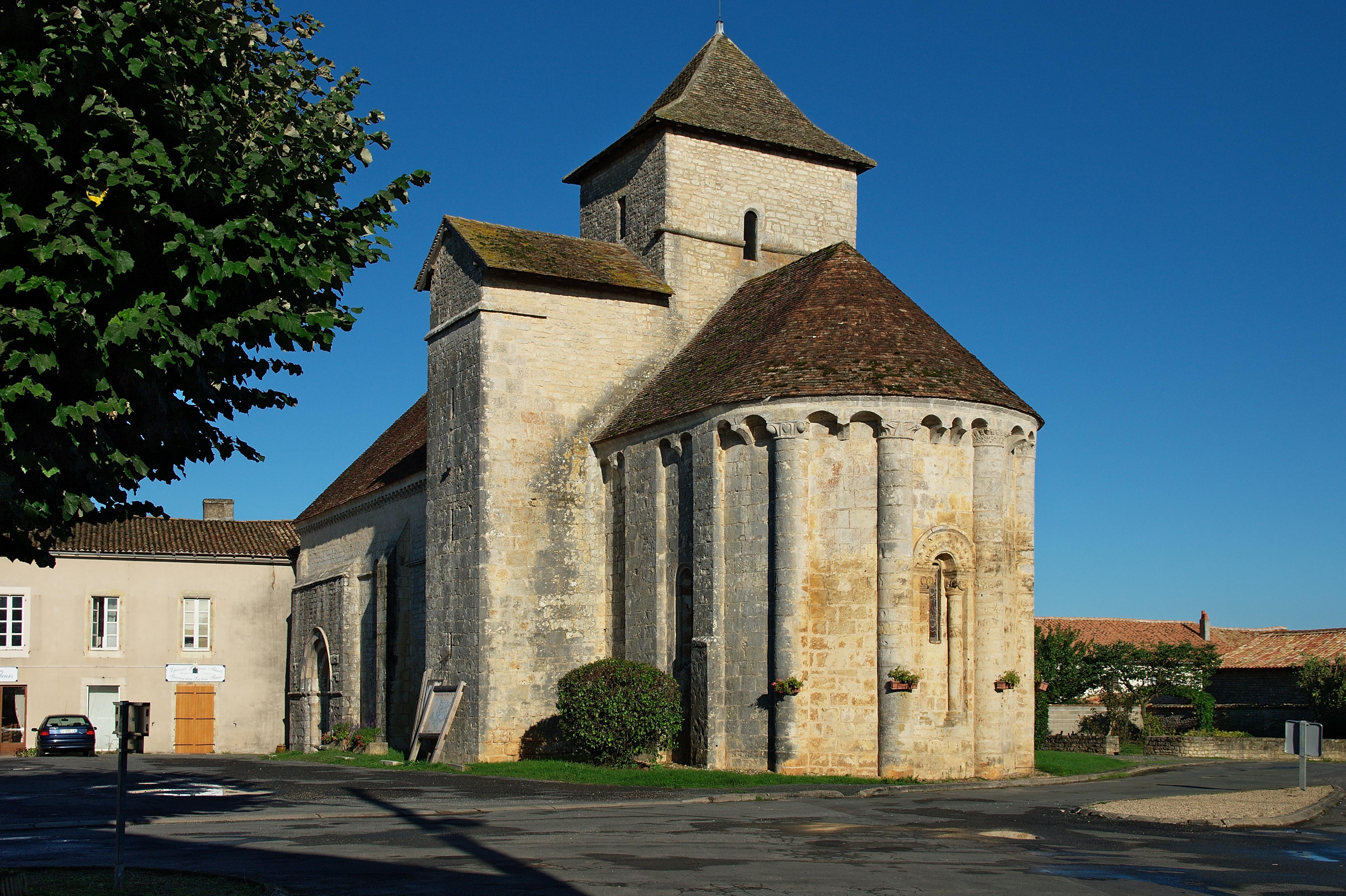
- The church of Saint-Jean Baptiste, in Limalonges
- Location of Limalonges
- Location within France Location within Nouvelle-Aquitaine
- Coordinates: 46°07′51″N 0°10′11″E
- Country: France
- Region: Nouvelle-Aquitaine
- Department: Deux-Sèvres
- Arrondissement: Niort
- Canton: Melle

Government
  - Mayor (2020–2026): Annette Machet
- Area^{1}: 24.39 km^{2} (9.42 sq mi)
- Elevation: 126 m (413 ft)
- Highest elevation: 187 m (614 ft)
- Lowest elevation: 112 m (367 ft)
- Population (2023): 843
  - Density: 34.6/km^{2} (89.5/sq mi)
- Time zone: UTC+01:00 (CET)
  - Summer (DST): UTC+02:00 (CEST)
- INSEE/Postal code: 79150 /79190
- ^{1} French Land Register data, which excludes lakes, ponds, glaciers > 1 km^{2} (0.386 sq mi or 247 acres) and river estuaries.

Limalonges (French pronunciation: [limalɔ̃ʒ]) is a commune in the Deux-Sèvres department in western France.

== See also ==
- Communes of the Deux-Sèvres department
