= Villemain =

- Commune
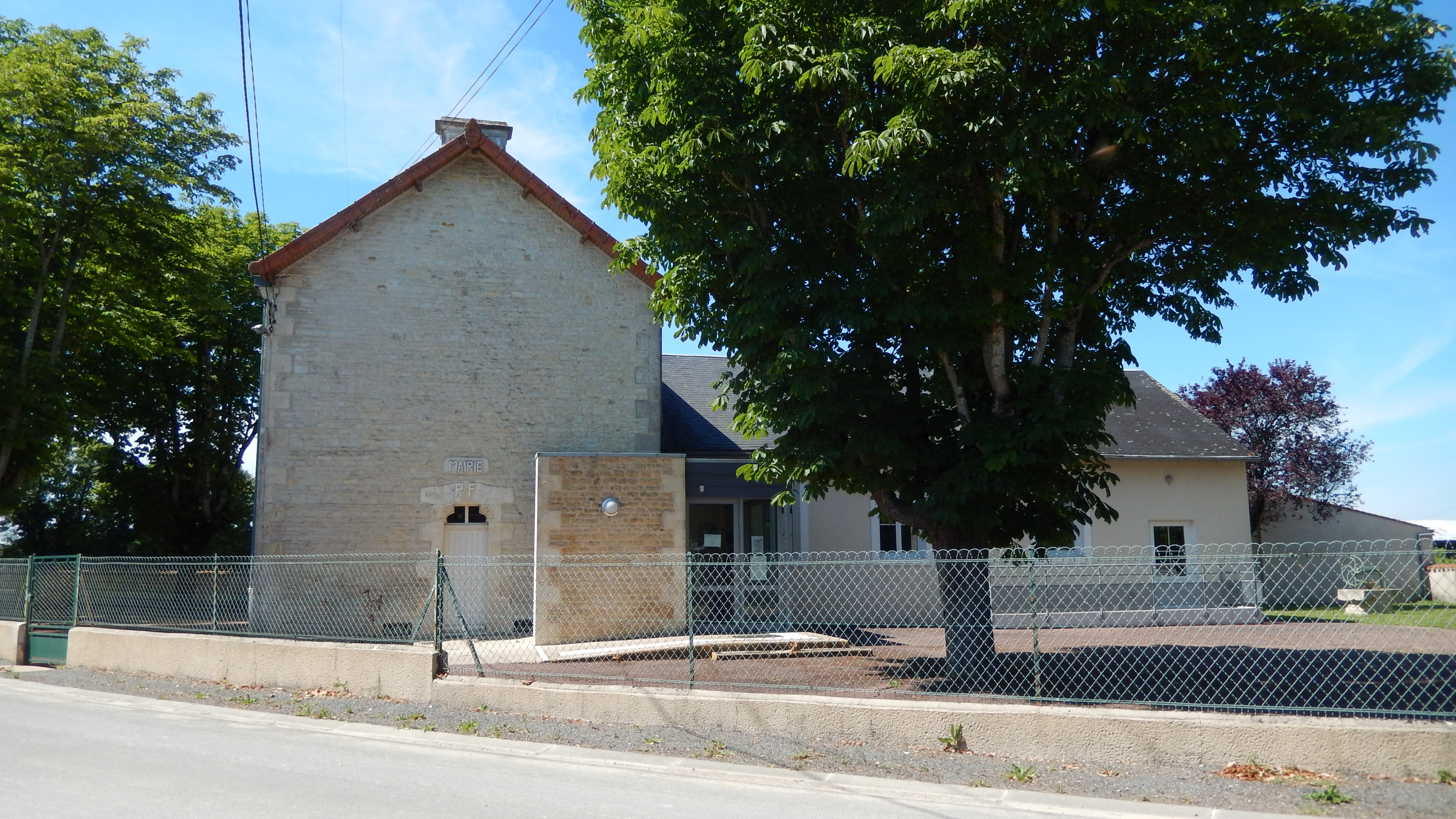
- Town hall
- Location of Villemain
- Location within France Location within Nouvelle-Aquitaine
- Coordinates: 46°01′27″N 0°05′09″W
- Country: France
- Region: Nouvelle-Aquitaine
- Department: Deux-Sèvres
- Arrondissement: Niort
- Canton: Melle

Government
  - Mayor (2020–2026): Bernard Vincent
- Area^{1}: 16.68 km^{2} (6.44 sq mi)
- Elevation: 113 m (371 ft)
- Highest elevation: 148 m (486 ft)
- Lowest elevation: 93 m (305 ft)
- Population (2023): 153
  - Density: 9.17/km^{2} (23.8/sq mi)
- Time zone: UTC+01:00 (CET)
  - Summer (DST): UTC+02:00 (CEST)
- INSEE/Postal code: 79349 /79110
- ^{1} French Land Register data, which excludes lakes, ponds, glaciers > 1 km^{2} (0.386 sq mi or 247 acres) and river estuaries.

Villemain is a commune in the Deux-Sèvres department in western France.

== See also ==
- Communes of the Deux-Sèvres department
