= Couture-d'Argenson =

- Commune
- Location of Couture-d'Argenson
- Location within France Location within Nouvelle-Aquitaine
- Coordinates: 45°59′37″N 0°04′59″W
- Country: France
- Region: Nouvelle-Aquitaine
- Department: Deux-Sèvres
- Arrondissement: Niort
- Canton: Melle
- Intercommunality: Mellois en Poitou

Government
  - Mayor (2020–2026): Eric Racine
- Area^{1}: 24.16 km^{2} (9.33 sq mi)
- Elevation: 90 m (300 ft)
- Highest elevation: 131 m (430 ft)
- Lowest elevation: 82 m (269 ft)
- Population (2023): 398
  - Density: 16.5/km^{2} (42.7/sq mi)
- Time zone: UTC+01:00 (CET)
  - Summer (DST): UTC+02:00 (CEST)
- INSEE/Postal code: 79106 /79110
- ^{1} French Land Register data, which excludes lakes, ponds, glaciers > 1 km^{2} (0.386 sq mi or 247 acres) and river estuaries.

Couture-d'Argenson is a commune in the Deux-Sèvres department in the Nouvelle-Aquitaine region in western France.

The village of Couture-d'Argenson belongs to the district of Niort and the canton of Chef-Boutonne. Its inhabitants are called the Couturois and Couturoises.

== See also ==
- Communes of the Deux-Sèvres department
