= Pierre de La Coste-Messelière =

French archaeologist (1894–1975)

Pierre René Marie Fernand Médéric François Frotier de La Coste-Messelière (3 March 1894, Saint-Génard (Deux-Sèvres) – 4 January 1975, idem) was a 20th-century French archaeologist and specialist of archaic Greek art.

He was elected a member of the Académie des inscriptions et belles-lettres in 1944 and also was a member of the French School of Athens.
