= Saint-Vincent-la-Châtre =

- Commune
- Location of Saint-Vincent-la-Châtre
- Location within France Location within Nouvelle-Aquitaine
- Coordinates: 46°13′21″N 0°02′06″W
- Country: France
- Region: Nouvelle-Aquitaine
- Department: Deux-Sèvres
- Arrondissement: Niort
- Canton: Melle
- Intercommunality: Mellois en Poitou

Government
  - Mayor (2020–2026): Jacques Trichet
- Area^{1}: 21.18 km^{2} (8.18 sq mi)
- Elevation: 180 m (590 ft)
- Highest elevation: 177 m (581 ft)
- Lowest elevation: 142 m (466 ft)
- Population (2023): 589
  - Density: 27.8/km^{2} (72.0/sq mi)
- Time zone: UTC+01:00 (CET)
  - Summer (DST): UTC+02:00 (CEST)
- INSEE/Postal code: 79301 /79500
- ^{1} French Land Register data, which excludes lakes, ponds, glaciers > 1 km^{2} (0.386 sq mi or 247 acres) and river estuaries.

Saint-Vincent-la-Châtre (French pronunciation: [sɛ̃ vɛ̃sɑ̃ la ʃatʁ]) is a commune in the Deux-Sèvres department in western France.

== See also ==
- Communes of the Deux-Sèvres department
