= Montalembert, Deux-Sèvres =

Montalembert
- Part of Sauzé-entre-Bois
- Coat of arms
- Location of Montalembert
- Location within France Location within Nouvelle-Aquitaine
- Coordinates: 46°06′41″N 0°09′30″E
- Country: France
- Region: Nouvelle-Aquitaine
- Department: Deux-Sèvres
- Arrondissement: Niort
- Canton: Melle
- Commune: Sauzé-entre-Bois
- Area^{1}: 11.8 km^{2} (4.6 sq mi)
- Elevation: 180 m (590 ft)
- Highest elevation: 187 m (614 ft)
- Lowest elevation: 118 m (387 ft)
- Population (2022): 298
  - Density: 25.3/km^{2} (65.4/sq mi)
- Time zone: UTC+01:00 (CET)
  - Summer (DST): UTC+02:00 (CEST)
- Postal code: 79190
- ^{1} French Land Register data, which excludes lakes, ponds, glaciers > 1 km^{2} (0.386 sq mi or 247 acres) and river estuaries.

Montalembert (French pronunciation: [mɔ̃talɑ̃bɛʁ]) is a former commune in the Deux-Sèvres department in western France. On 1 January 2025, it was merged into the new commune of Sauzé-entre-Bois.

== See also ==
- Communes of the Deux-Sèvres department
