= Lorigné =

- Commune
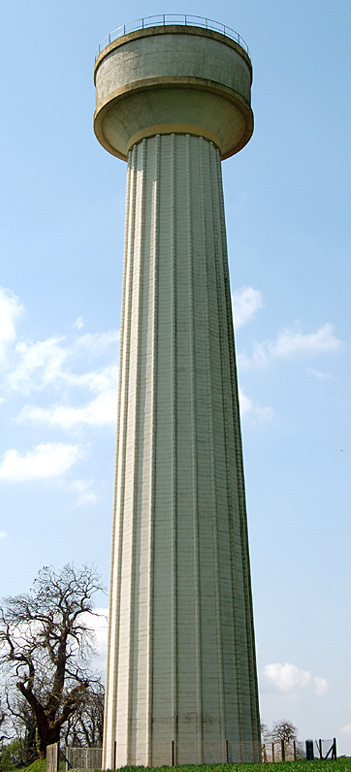
- The water tower in Lorigné
- Location of Lorigné
- Location within France Location within Nouvelle-Aquitaine
- Coordinates: 46°06′38″N 0°03′42″E
- Country: France
- Region: Nouvelle-Aquitaine
- Department: Deux-Sèvres
- Arrondissement: Niort
- Canton: Melle

Government
  - Mayor (2020–2026): Gilbert Hoellinger
- Area^{1}: 11.1 km^{2} (4.3 sq mi)
- Elevation: 154 m (505 ft)
- Highest elevation: 161 m (528 ft)
- Lowest elevation: 129 m (423 ft)
- Population (2023): 303
  - Density: 27.3/km^{2} (70.7/sq mi)
- Time zone: UTC+01:00 (CET)
  - Summer (DST): UTC+02:00 (CEST)
- INSEE/Postal code: 79152 /79190
- ^{1} French Land Register data, which excludes lakes, ponds, glaciers > 1 km^{2} (0.386 sq mi or 247 acres) and river estuaries.

Lorigné (French pronunciation: [lɔʁiɲe]) is a commune in the Deux-Sèvres department in western France.

== See also ==
- Communes of the Deux-Sèvres department
