= La Chapelle-Pouilloux =

- Commune
- Coat of arms
- Location of La Chapelle-Pouilloux
- Location within France Location within Nouvelle-Aquitaine
- Coordinates: 46°08′20″N 0°03′20″E
- Country: France
- Region: Nouvelle-Aquitaine
- Department: Deux-Sèvres
- Arrondissement: Niort
- Canton: Melle

Government
  - Mayor (2020–2026): Marie-Emmanuelle Saintier
- Area^{1}: 7.85 km^{2} (3.03 sq mi)
- Elevation: 140 m (460 ft)
- Highest elevation: 164 m (538 ft)
- Lowest elevation: 144 m (472 ft)
- Population (2023): 171
  - Density: 21.8/km^{2} (56.4/sq mi)
- Time zone: UTC+01:00 (CET)
  - Summer (DST): UTC+02:00 (CEST)
- INSEE/Postal code: 79074 /79190
- ^{1} French Land Register data, which excludes lakes, ponds, glaciers > 1 km^{2} (0.386 sq mi or 247 acres) and river estuaries.

La Chapelle-Pouilloux (French pronunciation: [la ʃapɛl puju]) is a commune in the Deux-Sèvres department in the Nouvelle-Aquitaine region in western France.

== See also ==
- Communes of the Deux-Sèvres department
