= Loubigné =

- Commune
- Location of Loubigné
- Location within France Location within Nouvelle-Aquitaine
- Coordinates: 46°04′43″N 0°05′06″W
- Country: France
- Region: Nouvelle-Aquitaine
- Department: Deux-Sèvres
- Arrondissement: Niort
- Canton: Melle

Government
  - Mayor (2020–2026): Cyril Balland
- Area^{1}: 11.01 km^{2} (4.25 sq mi)
- Elevation: 118 m (387 ft)
- Highest elevation: 158 m (518 ft)
- Lowest elevation: 82 m (269 ft)
- Population (2023): 157
  - Density: 14.3/km^{2} (36.9/sq mi)
- Time zone: UTC+01:00 (CET)
  - Summer (DST): UTC+02:00 (CEST)
- INSEE/Postal code: 79153 /79110
- ^{1} French Land Register data, which excludes lakes, ponds, glaciers > 1 km^{2} (0.386 sq mi or 247 acres) and river estuaries.

Loubigné (French pronunciation: [lubiɲe]) is a commune in the Deux-Sèvres department in western France.

== See also ==
- Communes of the Deux-Sèvres department
