= Les Alleuds, Deux-Sèvres =

Les Alleuds
- Part of Alloinay
- Location of Les Alleuds
- Location within France Location within Nouvelle-Aquitaine
- Coordinates: 46°09′53″N 0°00′22″W
- Country: France
- Region: Nouvelle-Aquitaine
- Department: Deux-Sèvres
- Arrondissement: Niort
- Canton: Melle
- Commune: Alloinay
- Area^{1}: 9.15 km^{2} (3.53 sq mi)
- Highest elevation: 171 m (561 ft)
- Lowest elevation: 144 m (472 ft)
- Population (2022): 294
  - Density: 32.1/km^{2} (83.2/sq mi)
- Time zone: UTC+01:00 (CET)
  - Summer (DST): UTC+02:00 (CEST)
- Postal code: 79190
- ^{1} French Land Register data, which excludes lakes, ponds, glaciers > 1 km^{2} (0.386 sq mi or 247 acres) and river estuaries.

Les Alleuds (French pronunciation: [le.z‿alø]) is a former commune in the Deux-Sèvres department in the Nouvelle-Aquitaine region in western France. On 1 January 2017, it was merged into the new commune Alloinay.

== See also ==
- Communes of the Deux-Sèvres department
