= Gournay =

Gournay is the name or part of the name of six communes of France:

- Gournay, Indre in the Indre département
- Gournay-en-Bray in the Seine-Maritime département
- Gournay-le-Guérin in the Eure département
- Gournay-Loizé in the Deux-Sèvres département
- Gournay-sur-Aronde in the Oise département
- Gournay-sur-Marne in the Seine-Saint-Denis département

Gournay may also refer to:

- Marie de Gournay (1565–1645), 17th-century French writer
- Jacques Claude Marie Vincent de Gournay (1712-1759), 18th-century French economist.
- Gournay Court a country house in West Harptree, Somerset, England
