= Clussais-la-Pommeraie =

- Commune
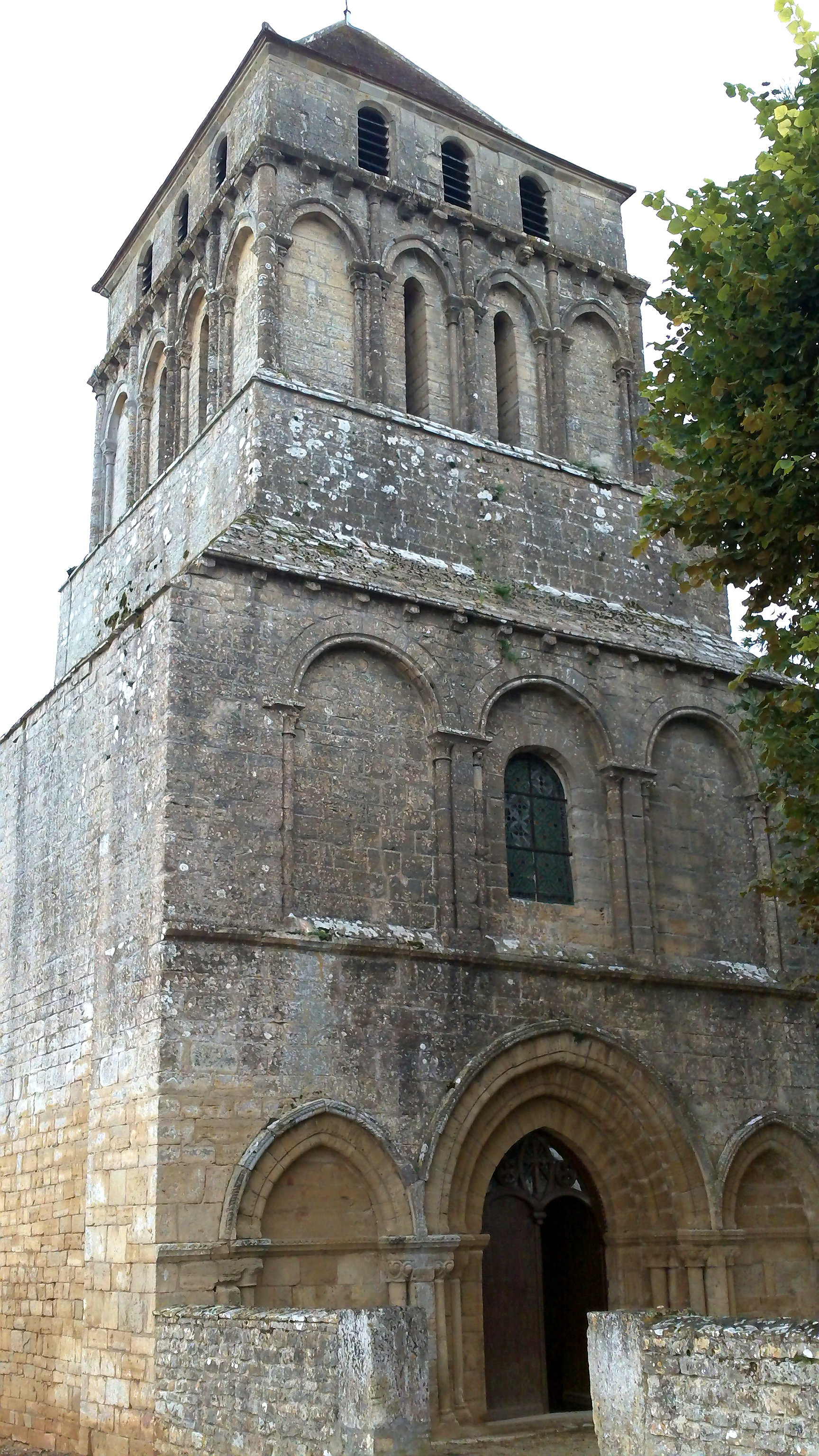
- The church in Clussais-la-Pommeraie
- Location of Clussais-la-Pommeraie
- Location within France Location within Nouvelle-Aquitaine
- Coordinates: 46°11′11″N 0°01′59″E
- Country: France
- Region: Nouvelle-Aquitaine
- Department: Deux-Sèvres
- Arrondissement: Niort
- Canton: Melle

Government
  - Mayor (2020–2026): Etienne Fouché
- Area^{1}: 31.03 km^{2} (11.98 sq mi)
- Elevation: 130 m (430 ft)
- Highest elevation: 166 m (545 ft)
- Lowest elevation: 127 m (417 ft)
- Population (2023): 562
  - Density: 18.1/km^{2} (46.9/sq mi)
- Time zone: UTC+01:00 (CET)
  - Summer (DST): UTC+02:00 (CEST)
- INSEE/Postal code: 79095 /79190
- ^{1} French Land Register data, which excludes lakes, ponds, glaciers > 1 km^{2} (0.386 sq mi or 247 acres) and river estuaries.

Clussais-la-Pommeraie (French pronunciation: [klysɛ la pɔmʁɛ]) is a commune in the Deux-Sèvres department in the Nouvelle-Aquitaine region in western France.

== See also ==
- Communes of the Deux-Sèvres department
