= Chef-Boutonne =

- Commune
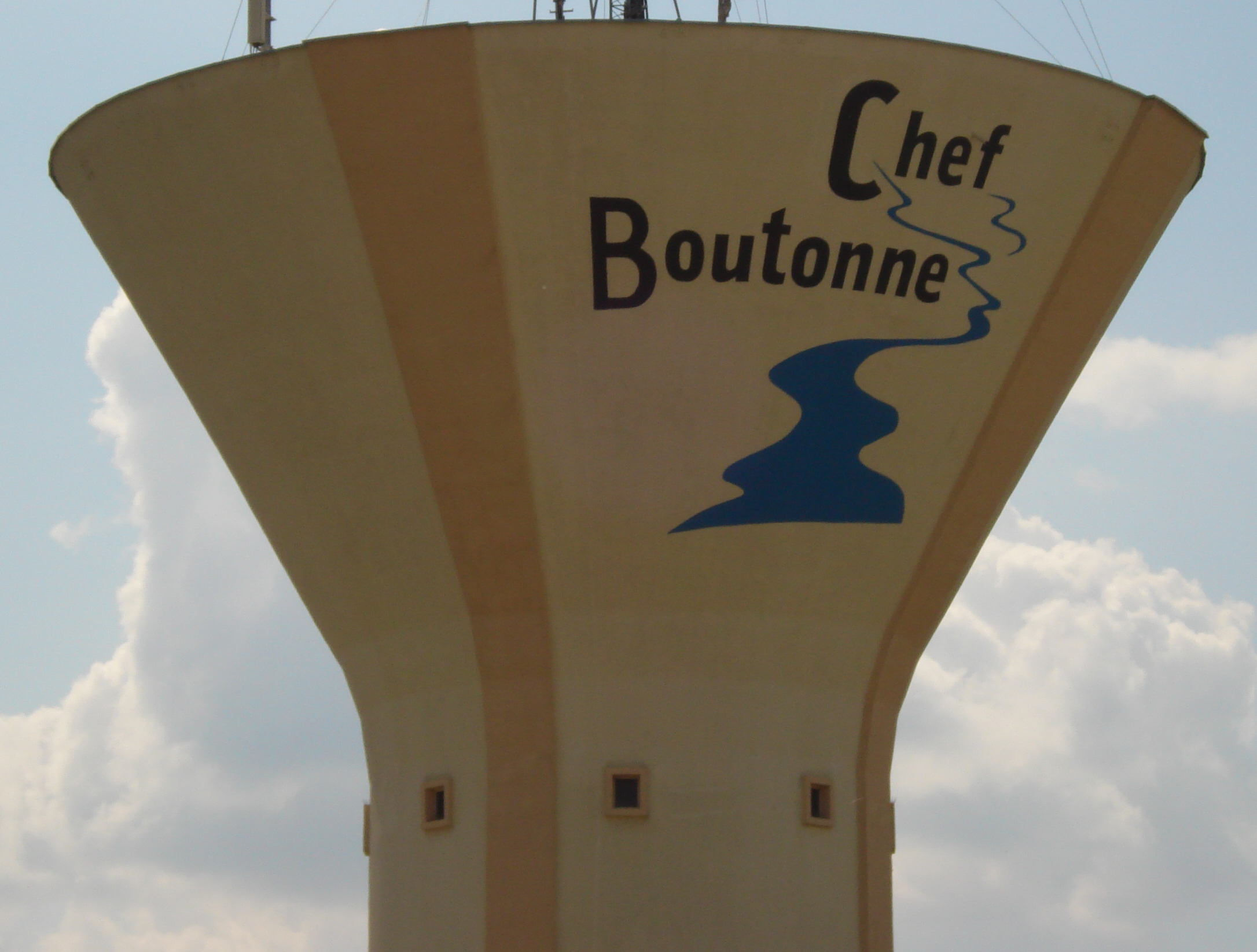
- The water tower in Chef-Boutonne

- Coat of arms
- Location of Chef-Boutonne
- Location within France Location within Nouvelle-Aquitaine
- Coordinates: 46°06′38″N 0°04′06″W
- Country: France
- Region: Nouvelle-Aquitaine
- Department: Deux-Sèvres
- Arrondissement: Niort
- Canton: Melle
- Intercommunality: Mellois en Poitou

Government
  - Mayor (2020–2026): Fabrice Michelet
- Area^{1}: 40.38 km^{2} (15.59 sq mi)
- Elevation: 73 m (240 ft)
- Highest elevation: 146 m (479 ft)
- Lowest elevation: 71 m (233 ft)
- Population (2023): 2,371
  - Density: 58.72/km^{2} (152.1/sq mi)
- Time zone: UTC+01:00 (CET)
  - Summer (DST): UTC+02:00 (CEST)
- INSEE/Postal code: 79083 /79110
- ^{1} French Land Register data, which excludes lakes, ponds, glaciers > 1 km^{2} (0.386 sq mi or 247 acres) and river estuaries.

Chef-Boutonne (French pronunciation: [ʃɛf butɔn]) is a commune in the Deux-Sèvres department in the Nouvelle-Aquitaine region in western France. On 1 January 2019, the former communes La Bataille, Crézières and Tillou were merged into Chef-Boutonne.

== Geography ==
The Boutonne has its source in the commune, hence its name, Chef-Boutonne meaning head of the Boutonne.

== Population ==
The population data below refer to the commune in its geography as of January 2025.

Historical population
Year	Pop.	±% p.a.
1968	2,838	—
1975	2,888	+0.25%
1982	2,870	−0.09%
1990	2,739	−0.58%
1999	2,673	−0.27%
2007	2,715	+0.20%
2012	2,533	−1.38%
2017	2,563	+0.24%
2023	2,371	−1.29%
Source: INSEE

== See also ==
- Communes of the Deux-Sèvres department
