= Aubigné, Deux-Sèvres =

Aubigné
- Commune
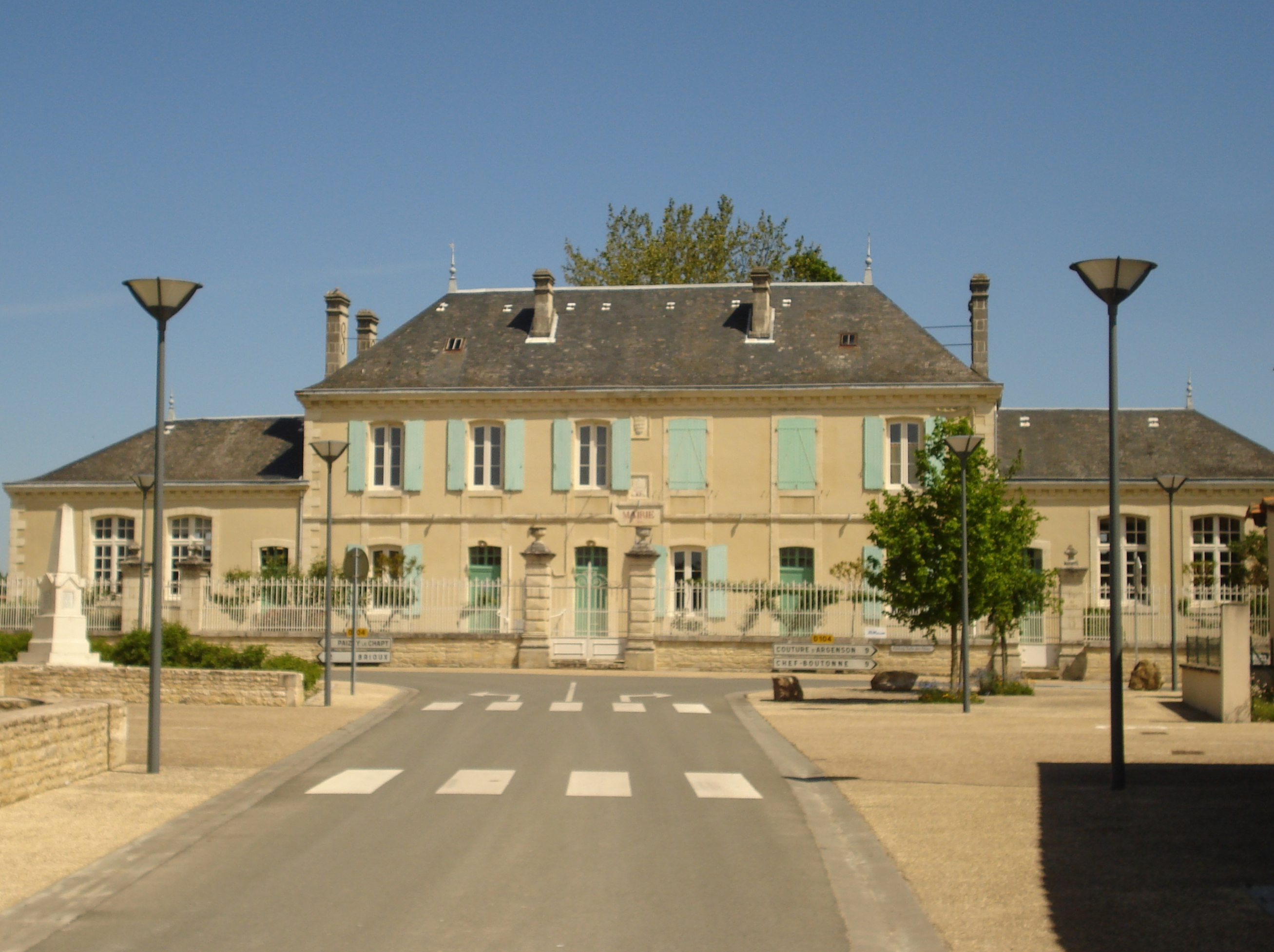
- The town hall in Aubigné
- Location of Aubigné
- Location within France Location within Nouvelle-Aquitaine
- Coordinates: 46°03′25″N 0°08′28″W
- Country: France
- Region: Nouvelle-Aquitaine
- Department: Deux-Sèvres
- Arrondissement: Niort
- Canton: Melle
- Intercommunality: Mellois en Poitou

Government
  - Mayor (2020–2026): Philippe Blaud
- Area^{1}: 29.15 km^{2} (11.25 sq mi)
- Highest elevation: 159 m (522 ft)
- Lowest elevation: 99 m (325 ft)
- Population (2023): 163
  - Density: 5.59/km^{2} (14.5/sq mi)
- Time zone: UTC+01:00 (CET)
  - Summer (DST): UTC+02:00 (CEST)
- INSEE/Postal code: 79018 /79110
- ^{1} French Land Register data, which excludes lakes, ponds, glaciers > 1 km^{2} (0.386 sq mi or 247 acres) and river estuaries.

Aubigné (French pronunciation: [obiɲe]) is a commune in the Deux-Sèvres department in the Nouvelle-Aquitaine region in western France.

== See also ==
- Communes of the Deux-Sèvres department
