= John Gourlay (Scottish footballer) =

Scottish footballer

John Gourlay (1879 – unknown) was a Scottish footballer who played as a defender. Born in Kirkendbright, he played for Annbank and Manchester United.
