= Saint-Romans-lès-Melle =

- Commune
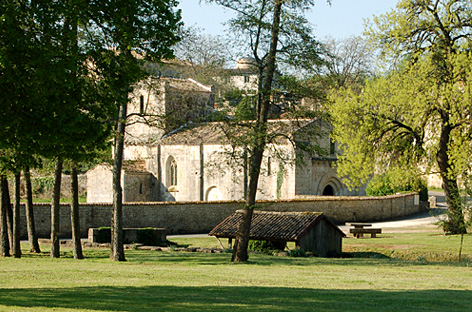
- A general view of Saint-Romans-lès-Melle

- Coat of arms
- Location of Saint-Romans-lès-Melle
- Location within France Location within Nouvelle-Aquitaine
- Coordinates: 46°12′33″N 0°11′23″W
- Country: France
- Region: Nouvelle-Aquitaine
- Department: Deux-Sèvres
- Arrondissement: Niort
- Canton: Melle

Government
  - Mayor (2020–2026): Jérôme Peltier
- Area^{1}: 8.91 km^{2} (3.44 sq mi)
- Elevation: 120 m (390 ft)
- Highest elevation: 124 m (407 ft)
- Lowest elevation: 63 m (207 ft)
- Population (2023): 729
  - Density: 81.8/km^{2} (212/sq mi)
- Time zone: UTC+01:00 (CET)
  - Summer (DST): UTC+02:00 (CEST)
- INSEE/Postal code: 79295 /79500
- ^{1} French Land Register data, which excludes lakes, ponds, glaciers > 1 km^{2} (0.386 sq mi or 247 acres) and river estuaries.

Saint-Romans-lès-Melle (French pronunciation: [sɛ̃ ʁɔmɑ̃ lɛ mɛl], literally Saint-Romans near Melle) is a commune in the Deux-Sèvres department in western France.

== See also ==
- Communes of the Deux-Sèvres department
