= Gournay-sur-Aronde =

- Commune
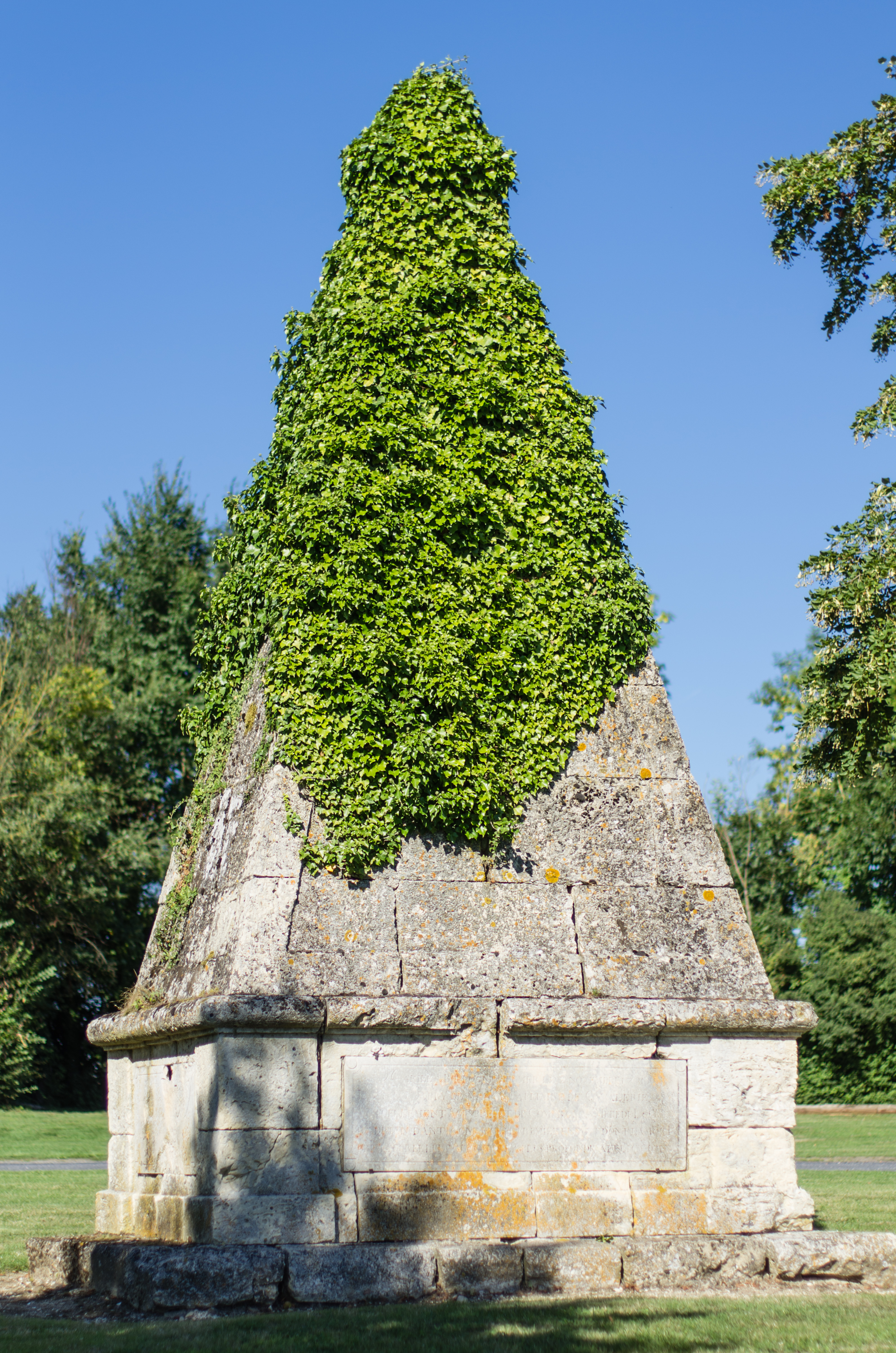
- The funerary monument of Madame Jarry de Mancy
- Location of Gournay-sur-Aronde
- Location within France Location within Hauts-de-France
- Coordinates: 49°29′36″N 2°40′30″E
- Country: France
- Region: Hauts-de-France
- Department: Oise
- Arrondissement: Compiègne
- Canton: Estrées-Saint-Denis
- Intercommunality: Pays des Sources

Government
  - Mayor (2020–2026): Daniel Forget
- Area^{1}: 14.71 km^{2} (5.68 sq mi)
- Elevation: 76 m (249 ft)
- Highest elevation: 127 m (417 ft)
- Lowest elevation: 47 m (154 ft)
- Population (2023): 515
  - Density: 35.0/km^{2} (90.7/sq mi)
- Time zone: UTC+01:00 (CET)
  - Summer (DST): UTC+02:00 (CEST)
- INSEE/Postal code: 60281 /60190
- ^{1} French Land Register data, which excludes lakes, ponds, glaciers > 1 km^{2} (0.386 sq mi or 247 acres) and river estuaries.

Gournay-sur-Aronde (French pronunciation: [ɡuʁnɛ syʁ aʁɔ̃d]) is a commune in the Oise department in northern France.

Gournay-sur-Aronde is best known for a Late Iron Age sanctuary that dates back to the 4th century BCE, and was burned and levelled at the end of the 1st century BCE. In the 4th century AD a Gallo-Roman temple was built on the site.

== Gallery ==
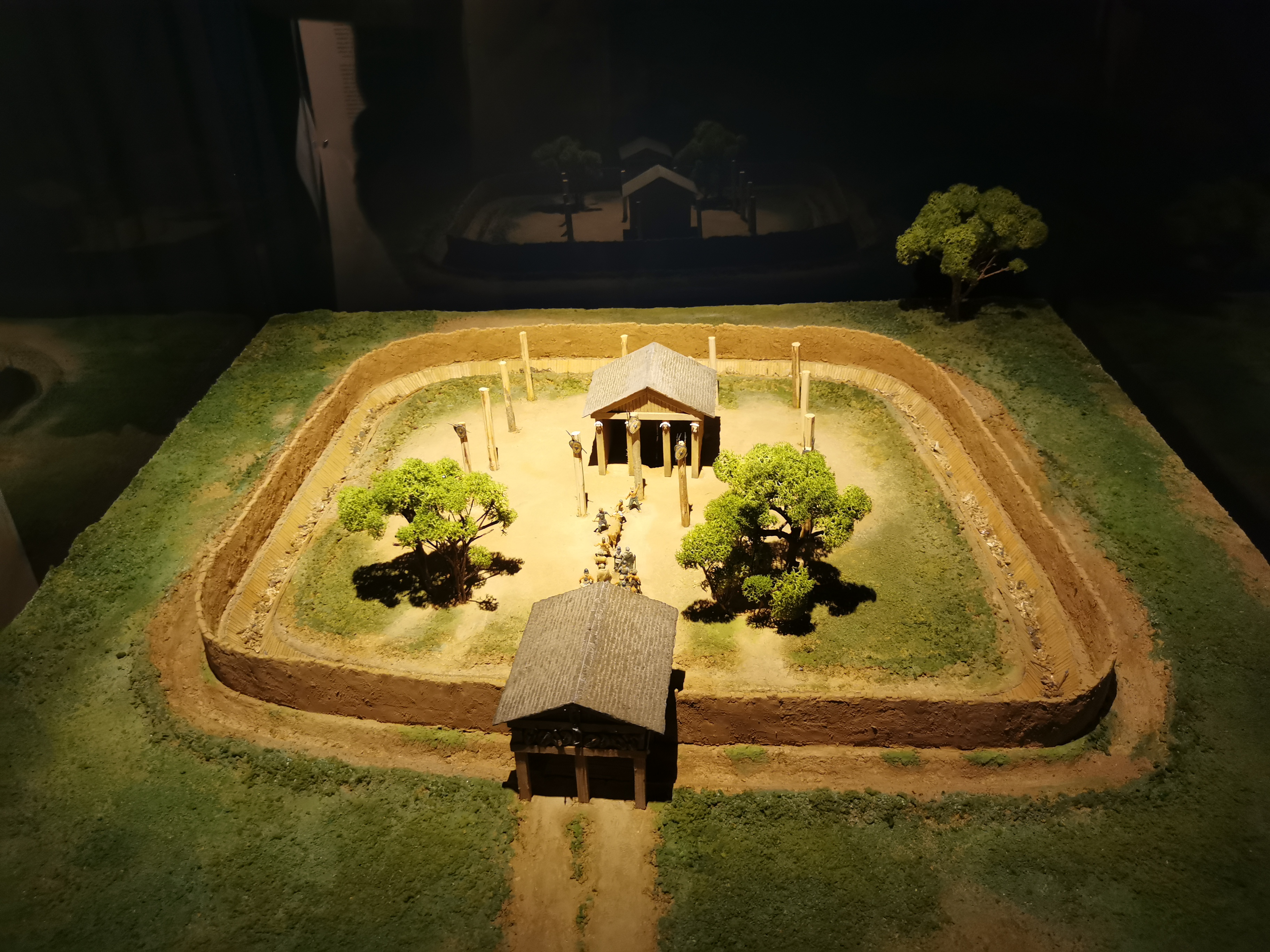
Model of the Celtic sanctuary of Gournay-sur-Aronde, 4th century BC

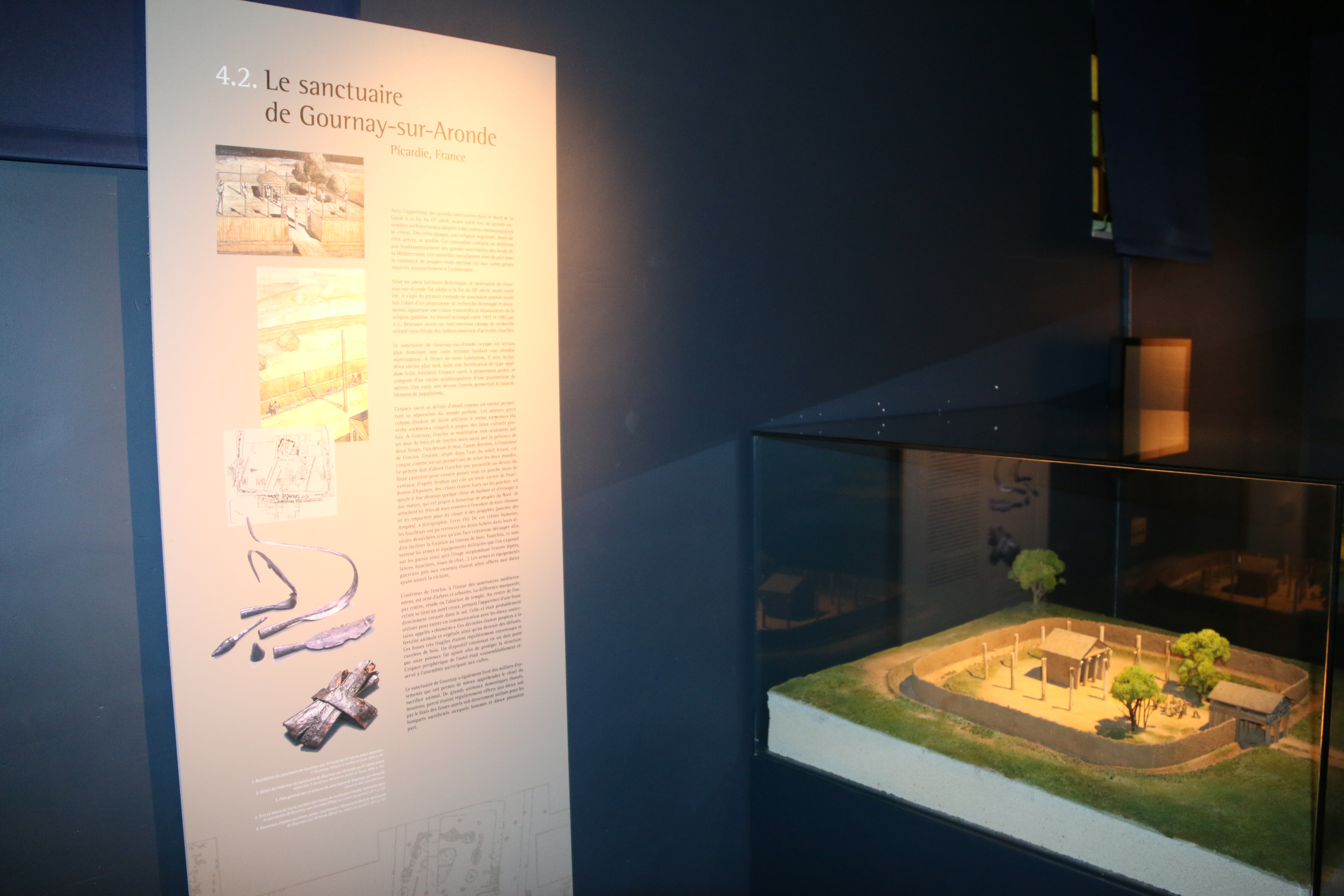
Model and information panel, Archéosite d'Aubechies

== See also ==
- Communes of the Oise department
