= Canton of Melle =

French canton founded in 2015

Coordinates: 46.22°N 0.15°W

The canton of Melle is an administrative division of the Deux-Sèvres department, western France. Its borders were modified at the French canton reorganisation which came into effect in March 2015. Its seat is in Melle.

It consists of the following communes:

1. Alloinay
2. Aubigné
3. La Chapelle-Pouilloux
4. Chef-Boutonne
5. Clussais-la-Pommeraie
6. Couture-d'Argenson
7. Fontenille-Saint-Martin-d'Entraigues
8. Fontivillié
9. Limalonges
10. Lorigné
11. Loubigné
12. Loubillé
13. Mairé-Levescault
14. Maisonnay
15. Marcillé
16. Melle
17. Melleran
18. Saint-Romans-lès-Melle
19. Saint-Vincent-la-Châtre
20. Sauzé-entre-Bois
21. Valdelaume
22. Villemain
