= Chemins de fer de l'État =

State-owned French railway company

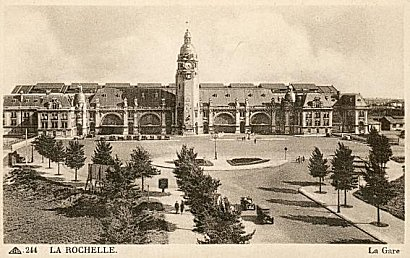
La Rochelle railway station

The Administration des chemins de fer de l'État (French pronunciation: [administʁasjɔ̃ de ʃəmɛ̃ də fɛʁ də leta], "State Railway Administration"), often referred to in France as the Réseau de l'État ([ʁezo də leta], "State Network"), was an early state-owned French railway company.

== History ==
The company was established by state order of the Third Republic on 25 May 1878 to take over ten small failing railway companies operating in the area between the rivers Loire and Garonne:

- Compagnie des chemins de fer des Charentes, 777 km, opened 1867;
- Compagnie des chemins de fer de la Vendée, 495 km, opened 1865;
- Compagnie du chemin de fer d’Orléans à Châlons, 293 km, opened 1873;
- Compagnie du chemin de fer d'Orléans à Rouen (Réseau de l'Eure), 338 km, opened 1867;
- Compagnie des chemins de fer Nantais, 185 km, opened September 1875;
- Compagnie des chemins de fer de Maine-et- Loire et Nantes, 91 km, opened February 1877;
- Compagnie du chemin de fer de Bressuire à Poitiers;
- Compagnie du chemin de fer de Saint-Nazaire au Croisic;
- Compagnie du chemin de fer de Clermont à Tulle;
- Compagnie du chemin de fer de Poitiers à Saumur.

Additional acquisitions included:

- Compagnie Bordeaux – La Sauve, 29 km, opened May 1873, acquired by CF des Charentes in June 1874, sold to the PO in 1883
- Compagnie de la Seudre, circa 50 km, opened 1874, acquired by État July 1880;
- Compagnie Barbezieux – Châteauneuf-sur-Charente, opened 1872, acquired by État in 1893;
- Compagnie Alais – Rhone – Méditerranée, opened 1882, acquired by État in 1883.

On 18 November 1908, the État absorbed the Chemins de fer de l'Ouest and in 1934 took over the Paris-Orléans (PO) company's lines in southern Brittany. At its greatest extent its operating area comprised all the territory west of a line extending from Dieppe by way of Paris to Bordeaux. On 1 January 1938 the État merged with all the other French railway companies to form the Société Nationale des Chemins de fer Français (SNCF), becoming that company's Région Ouest. The État then took a seat on the SNCF's Board of Directors, as did all the other companies until 1982 when all traces of the constituents of the SNCF disappeared.

=== Ligne Paris-Bordeaux ===
One of the PO's flagship lines was Paris-Orléans-Bordeaux. The État wished to create a competing line to the PO's. The PO line served Tours, Poitiers, and Angoulême, while the État decided to serve Chartres, Courtalain, Saumur, Niort, and Saintes, almost parallel to the competing line.

Thanks to purchases and exchanges made in 1878 with the PO, by 1884, the État operated:

- Chartres - Courtalain
- Bessé-sur-Braye - Château-sur-Loir
- Saumur - Montreuil-Bellay
- Montreuil-Bellay - Saint-Jean-d'Angély
- Saint-Jean-d'Angély - Saintes
- Saintes - Cavignac

Courtalain-Bessé-sur-Braye was opened in 1885 as well as Château-sur-Loir-Saumur-Cavignac. At La Grave d'Ambarès a junction with the PO was built, and État trains linked Paris and Bordeaux on 11 July 1886.

The last line portion was the hardest to build. On 1 July 1893, an extension via Lormont was opened, Three years later, on 1 August 1896 Bordeaux-État was opened, welcoming trains from Paris.

The État's line was 610 km while the PO's was 582 km. These were the only competing lines in France. This lasted until 1938, date of the creation the SNCF, when the PO line was kept.

=== The Dautry era ===
Raoul Dautry became managing director of the Etat in 1928. His desires were to reconquer the railway company's clientele, especially due to the popularity of the car.

Dautry began many modernisation projects, including infrastructure, stations and the opening of new lines (mainly Paris-Chartres by Gallardon). The electrification of the Paris-Le Mans line represents the biggest of his constructions, the line was at the time the most modern line in France.

Another one of his influences was the purchase of 600 new passenger cars. 50 of the cars were luxurious cars and were used on the new electrified line.

As early as 1929, the Etat began experimenting with DMUs with a first order of Renault trains. In 1931, an agreement is reached between Michelin and the Etat, authorising trials of the Micheline train. By 1933, the trains were used for expresses between Paris and Deauville.

During the summer of 1937, the French Government ruled in favour of the nationalisation of the French railways. As a sign of disagreement, Dautry resigned, he was later elected into the SNCF's managing council.

=== Line openings ===
Date	Section	Length (km)
7 January 1856	Poitiers - Niort (Note: Taken over by the CF de l'Etat on 10 February 1884.)	78
7 September 1857	Niort - La Rochelle	66
24 September 1866	Cholet - La Poissonnière (Note: Taken over by the CF de l'Etat on 20 February 1884.)	43
30 December 1866	Nantes - La Roche-sur-Yon (Note: Taken over by the CF de l'Etat on 25 January 1884.)	76
28 December 1868	Niort - Cholet	124
22 October 1867	Rochefort - Angoulême (Note: Taken over by the CF de l'Etat on 1 July 1878.)	68
25 March 1869	Beillant - Pons	15
26 January 1870	Pons - Jonzac	19
14 March 1871	La Roche-sur-Yon - La Rochelle	103
27 March 1871	La Roche-sur-Yon - Bressuire	84
6 November 1871	Jonzac - Montendre	21
28 October 1872	Chartres - Orléans	75
20 November 1872	Barbezieux - Châteauneuf (Note: Taken over by the CF de l'Etat on 1 January 1894.)	18
10 May 1873	Bressuire - Thouars	30
11 August 1873	Thouars - Chinon	47
10 October 1873	Saint-Mariens-Saint-Yzan - Blaye	24
16 October 1873	Montendre - Saint-Mariens-Saint-Yzan	
29 December 1873	La Rochelle - Rochefort	30
15 May 1874	Neuville-de-Poitou - Montreuil-Bellay	85
19 October 1874	Saint-Mariens-Saint-Yzan - Coutras	17
19 April 1875	Joué-lès-Tours - Chinon	43
29 August 1875	Pons - Royan (Note: Taken over by the CF de l'Etat on 1 January 1881.)	46
11 September 1875	Nantes - Pornic	57
30 January 1876	Saumur - Montreuil-Bellay	18
25 March 1876	Sainte Pazanne - Machecoul	13
1 April 1876	Chartres - Auneau	20
7 May 1876	Chartres - Brou	36
3 June 1876	St Hiliaire - Paimbœuf	27
24 June 1876	Saujon - La Tremblarde	23
1 February 1877	Montreuil-Bellay - Angers	63
25 January 1878	Saint-Jean-d'Angély - Taillebourg	18
30 December 1878	Machecoul - Challans	19
3 March 1879	Château-du-Loir - Saint-Calais (Note: Taken over by the CF de l'Etat on 10 March 1884.)	45
19 September 1880	Challans - La Roche-sur-Yon	51
7 March 1881	Through Luçon	2
17 October 1881	Saint-Jean-d'Angély - Niort	48
17 October 1881	Saint-Gilles-Croix-de-Vie - Commesquiers	13
17 October 1881	Velluire - Benet	19
20 November 1881	Blois - Pont-de-Braye	64
2 July 1882	Chinon - Port-Boulet	14
10 July 1882	Cholet - Clisson	38
23 October 1882	Niort - Montreuil-Bellay	104
27 November 1882	Chinon - L'Île-Bouchard	16
19 March 1883	Neuville-de-Poitou - Parthenay	39
2 April 1883	Patay - Courtalain-Saint-Pellerin	47
2 April 1883	Brou - Courtalain-Saint-Pellerin	17
3 September 1883	Saint-Laurent-de-la-Prée - La Pointe-de-la-fumée	8
5 November 1883	Through Marans	2
7 April 1884	Airvault - Moncontour	15
18 August 1884	Perray-Jouannet - Chalonnes	26
23 February 1885	Aiffres - Ruffec [Aiffres to Ruffec Line]	77
23 May 1885	Courtalain-Saint-Pellerin - Bessé-sur-Braye	42
12 July 1885	Port-de-Piles - L'Île-Bouchard	21
4 March 1886	Through Nantes	4
14 June 1886	Cavignac - Cubzac	17
11 July 1886	Cubzac - La Grave-d'Ambarès	5
11 July 1886	Through Bordeaux	2
11 July 1886	Château-du-Loir - Saumur	67
11 July 1886	Through Saumur	5
19 September 1886	Châtellerault - Loudun	48
1 May 1887	Arrou - Nogent-le-Rotrou	41
29 May 1887	Libourne - Marcenais	19
5 June 1887	Parthenay - Bressuire	31
17 February 1889	Tonnay-Charente - Pointe-du-Chapus	31
18 May 1890	Fontenay-le-comte - Vouvant-Cezais	14
18 May 1890	Vouvant-Cezais - Breuil-Barret	15
1 April 1891	La Rochelle - Port de la Pallice	7
2 January 1893	Sargé - Montoire	22
1 July 1893	La Grave-d'Ambarès - Gare de Bordeaux Benauge	12
15 October 1893	Montoire - Château-Renault	21
29 July 1894	Château-Renault - Tours	35
31 May 1896	Voves - Toury	29
1 August 1896	Junction to Gare de Bordeaux État	1
2 January 1898	Thorigné - Montmirail	22
10 December 1899	La Loupe - Brou	43
28 May 1900	Vouvant-Cezay - Chantonnay	25
12 July 1900	Montmirail- Courtalain	28
12 July 1900	Thorigné - Connerré-Beillé	6
5 November 1907	Barbezieux - Saint-Mariens-Saint-Yzan	51
11 June 1911	Saint-Jean-d'Angély - Saintes	25
1 July 1912	Saintes - Saujon	27
15 May 1930	Massy - Chartres	71
