= List of French 'Pacific' steam locomotives =

A total of 1364 'Pacific' steam locomotives were built for the major French railway companies, (including those inherited by the terms of the Armistice in 1918). Some of these were later transferred to other companies or regions.

Chemins de fer d'Alsace et de Lorraine: 50 locomotives

- see List of Alsace-Lorraine locomotives

Compagnie de l'Est: 40 locomotives

- Est 31.001 to 31.040 series 11s (TP-État type) bought under the auspices of the ministry of public works in 1921–23, then Est 231-001 to 231-040, later 1-231.B.1 to 40
- Est 231-051 to 231-073 series 12s ("Chapelon" rebuilds, 2nd type, ex-PO 3500-series) ordered by the PO-Midi in 1934, later: 1-231.C.51 to 73

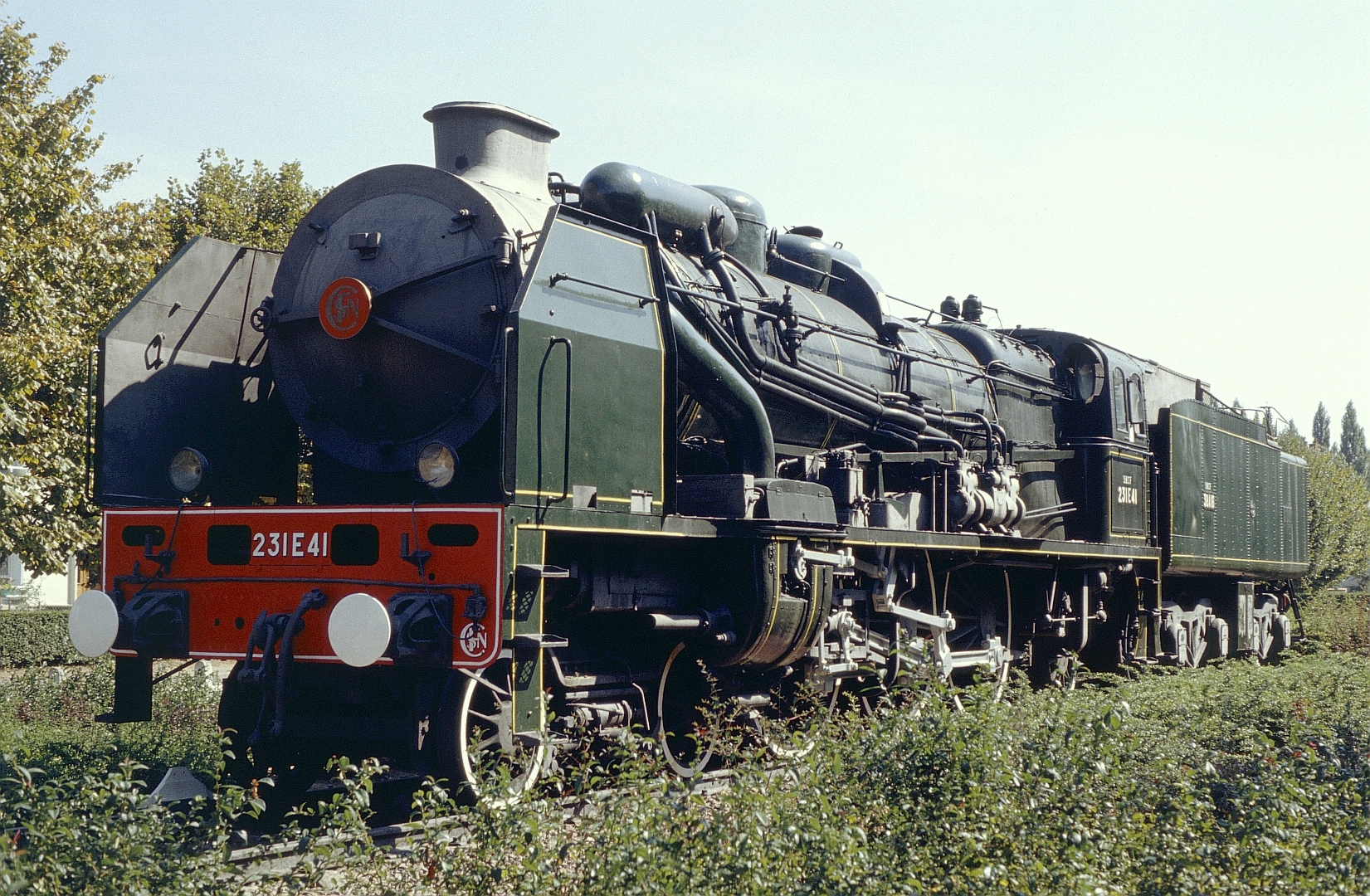
2-231 E 41 at St-Pierre-des-Corps in 1982

Compagnie du Nord: 139 locomotives

- Nord 3.1151 to 3.1170 (SACM type) copy of the Alsace-Lorraine S 12 of 1912, later 2-231.A.1 to 20
- Nord 3.1150 État locomotive n° 231-502 (1st) of 1914 not delivered because of the War, later 2-231.B.1; them 3-231.F.784
- Nord 3.1201 to 3.1240 so-called “Superpacific type 1” of 1923–24, later 2-231 C 1 to 40
- Nord 3.1241 to 3.1248 so-called “Superpacific type 2” of 1929 different in detail for the first type, later 2-231 C 41 to 48
- Nord 3.1251 to 3.1290 so-called “Superpacific type 3” of 1931 very different from types 1 and 2, later 2-231 C 49 to 88
- Nord 3.1249 and 3.1250 so-called “Superpacific type 2” prototypes rebuilt as simples, later 2-231.D.1 and 2
- Nord 3.1171 to 3.1190 ("Chapelon" rebuilds ex-3500 PO) ordered straight from the PO-Midi in 1934, later 2-231.E.1 to 20
- Nord 3.1191 to 3.1198 ("Chapelon" type, newly built) continuation, 1936, of the series 3.1171 – 3.1190, later 2-231.E.21 to 28
- Nord 3.1111 to 3.1130 ("Chapelon" type, newly built) continuation, 1937–38, of the series 3.1171 – 3.1198, later 2-231.E.29 to 48

Compagnie de l'Ouest: 2 locomotives

- Ouest 2901 and 2902 prototypes of 1908, then État 6001 and 6002, later État 231-001 et 231-002

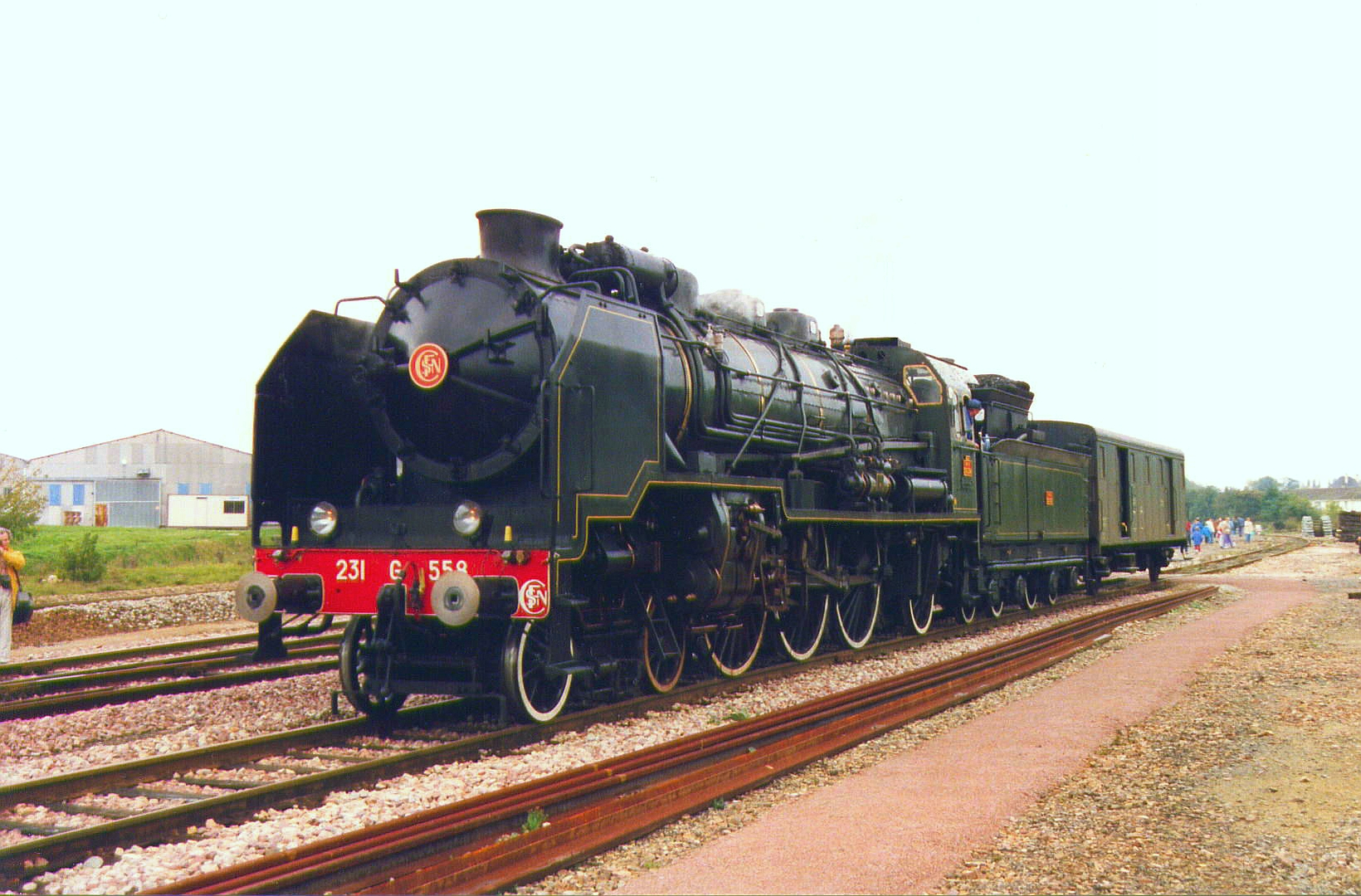
3-231 G 558 maintained in working order by the "Pacific Vapeur Club", here seen in 1993

Chemins de fer de l'État: 352 locomotives

- État 231-011 to 231-060, later 3-231.B.11 to 60
- État 231-401 to 231-420 TP-État type transferred from the PO-Midi, later 3-231.C.401 to 420
- État 231-501 to 231-783, later 3-231.C.501 to 783
- État 231-981 to 231-996, previously Bavarian S 3/6 (Armistice reparations, 1918), later 3-231.A.991 to 996
- État 231-997 to 231-999, previously Württemberg C (Armistice reparations, 1918), later 3-231.A.997 to 999

The locomotives numbered 3-231 C by the SNCF were also reclassified from D to J according to their degree of rebuilding or improvement.

- 10 locos 3-231.C.501 to 783 became 1-231.B.301 to 310 then 1-231.B.41 to 50

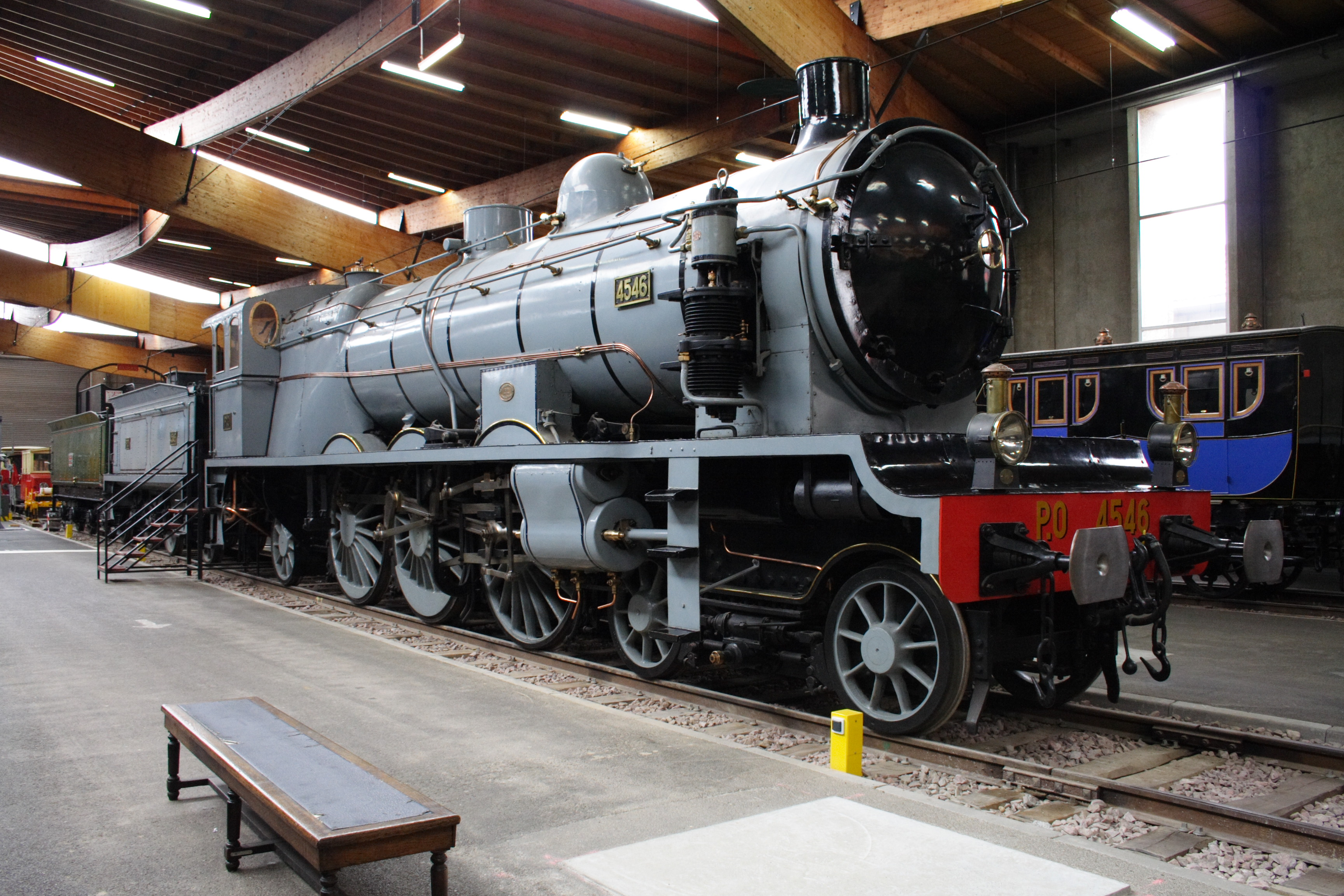
Pacific 4546 of the PO, saved by the SNCF and displayed at the Cité du train at Mulhouse (French National Railway Museum)

Compagnie du PO (Paris-Orléans): 279 locomotives

- 231 PO 4501–4600 two prototypes in 1907, the rest from 1908–1910, then PO-Midi 231-501 to 231-600, later 4-231 A 501 to 600
- 231 PO 3501–3589 of 1909–1910, then PO-Midi 231-401 to 231-489, all rebuilt before 1938
- 231 PO 3591–3640 (ALCO type) of 1921, then 231-591 to 231-640 PO-Midi, later 4-231 D 601 to 650
- 231 PO 3641–3680 (type TP-État) bought in 1923 under the auspices of the ministry of public works, transferred to the AL (20) and the État (20) before 1934
- 231 PO 3701–3721 ("Chapelon" 1st type) rebuilding of 3566 in 1929 and of 3501–3520 in 1932, then 231-701 to 231-721 PO-Midi, later 4-231 F 701 to 721
- 231 PO 3722–3731 ("Chapelon" 2nd type) modification, 1934, of locos of the series 3521–3550, then 231-722 to 231-731 PO-Midi, later 4-231 H 722 to 731
- 231 PO 3801–3806 and 3821–3829 modification, 1932, of locos of the series 3521–3550, then 231-801 to 231-809 PO-Midi and 231-821 to 231-829 PO-Midi, later 4-231 G 801 to 806 and 4-231 G 821 to 829. (The series 4-231 G became 4-231 J in 1952 when the 231 G of PLM origin arrived on the Région Sud-Ouest)
- 4-231 F 701 to 717 once became 1-231 C 401 to 417
- 11 machines 231-591 to 231-640 transferred to the État became 3-231 K 301 to 311

Compagnie du Midi: 40 locomotives

- Midi 3001–3016 then PO-Midi 231-001 to 231-016, later 4-231.B.001 to 016
- Midi 3051–3054 then PO-Midi 231-051 to 231-054, later 4-231.C.051 to 054
- Midi 3101–3120 then PO-Midi 231-101 to 231-120, later 4-231.E.101 to 120
- The 4-231.E locos became 6-231.L on the creation of the Région Méditerranée in 1947

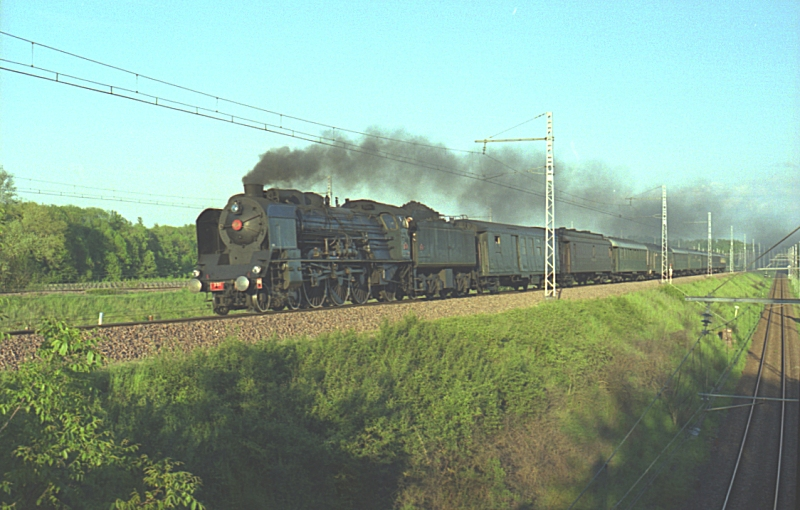
2-231 K 8 preserved by the Fédération des Amis des Chemins de Fer Secondaires and kept in working order by the organisation "MFPN", seen in 2005

Chemins de fer de Paris à Lyon et à la Méditerranée: 462 locomotives New construction

- 6001 prototype, compound and saturated steam, of 1909, then 231 C 1 in 1925, later 5-231 C 1
- 6011–6030 series of 1912 based on 6001, became 6201–6220 in 1913, then 231 C 86 and 2 to 20 in 1925, later 5-231 C 86 and 2 to 20
- 6101 prototype, simple expansion and superheater, 1909, then 231 A 1 in 1925 (rebuilt to become 231 E 1)
- 6102–6171 series of 1911 and 1912 based on 6101, then 231 A 2 to 71 in 1925 (rebuilt to become 231 E 2 to 71)
- 6172–6191 series of 1913 based on 6101 (rebuilt to become 6051–6070)
- 6221–6285 series of 1916–17 and 1919–21 derived from 6001, then 231 C 21 to 85 in 1925, later 5-231 C 21 to 85
- 6301–6480 series of 1921–24 derived from the series 6200, then 231 D 1 to 180 in 1925, later 5-231 D 1 to 180
- 231 D 181 to 230 series of 1925 continuation of 6301 – 6480, later 5-231 D 181 to 230
- 231 F 231 to 285 series of 1931–32 improved continuation of the series 231 D (later rebuilt to 231 G 231 to 285)

PLM Rebuilds

- 6051–6070 rebuild as compound, 1917–24, of 6172 – 6191, then 231 B 1 to 20 in 1925, later 5-231 B 1 to 20
- 231 C 9 rebuild 1934 as a prototype, later 5-231 K 9
- 231 C 17 rebuild 1935 as a prototype, later 231 I 17
- 231 E 1 to 71 rebuild as compound 1925–30 of 231 A 1 to 71, later 5-231 E 2 to 71
- 231 F 141 rebuild 1929 as prototype (later rebuilt as 231 H 141)
- 231 F between 2 and 166 rebuild 1930–32 of 24 231 D locos between 2 and 166 (later rebuilt as 231 G)
- 231 G between 2 and 230 rebuild from 1934 onwards of 27 231 D locos and of 231 F locos between 2 and 166, later 5-231 G between 2 and 230
- 231 G 231 to 285 rebuilding, 1934–38, of 231 F 231 to 285, later 5-231 G 231 to 285
- 231 H 141 rebuilding as a prototype, 1933, of 231 F 141, later 5-231 H 1
- 231 H 2 to 91 planned rebuilding by the PLM of 231 B and 231 E locos
- 231 I 17 temporary numbering of the 231 C 17 prototype (later rebuilt as 5-231 K 17)
- 231 K 1 to 86 planned rebuilding by the PLM of 231 C locos

SNCF Rebuilds

- 5-231 G between 2 and 230 continuation, 1938–49, of rebuilding 5-231 D (215 locos altogether)
- 5-231 H 2 to 30 rebuilding, 1938–48, of 12 5-231 B locos and 17 5-231 E locos
- 5-231 K 2 to 86 rebuilding, 1938–19, of 84 machines 5-231 C between 2 and 86
- From 1950 reallocation of 231 G and 231 K locomotives on the Est, Nord and Sud-ouest regions of the SNCF.
