= Ouest 2901 and 2902 =

4-6-2 locomotiives of the Chemins de fer de l'Ouest

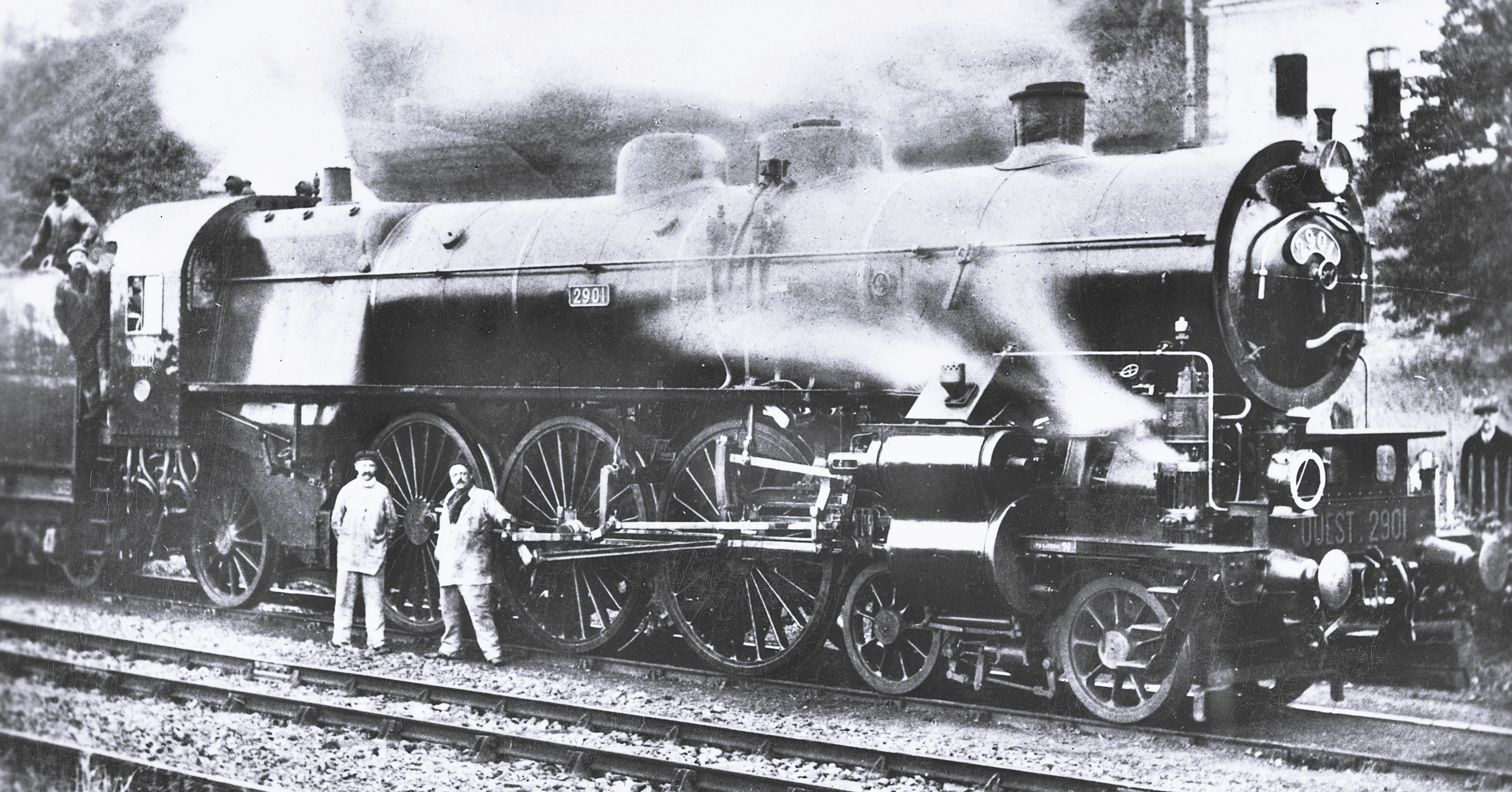
- Ouest 2901
Type and origin
- Power type: Steam
- Designer: Robert Dubois, Maurice Demoulin
- Builder: Ouest Workshops Sotteville-Quatre-Mares
- Build date: 1908
- Total produced: 2
Specifications
- Configuration
  - Whyte: 4-6-2
  - UIC: 2′C1′ n4v
- Gauge: 1,435 mm (4 ft 8 1/2 in)
- Leading dia.: 960 mm (3 ft 1.80 in)
- Driver dia.: 2,080 mm (6 ft 9.89 in)
- Trailing dia.: 1,370 mm (4 ft 5.94 in)
- Wheelbase: 10,570 mm (34 ft 8.14 in) (w/o tender)
- Length: 12,670 mm (41 ft 6.82 in) (21,000 mm (68 ft 10.77 in) with tender)
- Width: 2,800 mm (9 ft 2.24 in)
- Height: 4,300 mm (14 ft 1.29 in)
- Axle load: 17.85 t (39,400 lb)
- Adhesive weight: 53.55 t (118,100 lb)
- Loco weight: 90.7 t (200,000 lb)
- Tender weight: 57.8 t (127,400 lb)
- Total weight: 148.5 t (327,400 lb)
- Tender type: Bogie tender
- Fuel type: Coal
- Fuel capacity: 9 t (19,800 lb)
- Water cap.: 24,000 L (5,300 imp gal; 6,300 US gal)
- Firebox
  - Grate area: 4 m^{2} (43 sq ft)
- Boiler pressure: 16 kg/cm^{2} (1.57 MPa; 228 psi)
- Heating surface
  - Firebox: 13.95 m^{2} (150.2 sq ft)
  - Tubes: 269.1 m^{2} (2,897 sq ft)
  - Total surface: 283.05 m^{2} (3,046.7 sq ft)
- Cylinders: Four (Compound: 2 HP inside, 2 LP outside)
- High-pressure cylinder: 400 mm × 640 mm (15.75 in × 25.20 in)
- Low-pressure cylinder: 660 mm × 640 mm (25.98 in × 25.20 in)
- Valve gear: Walschaerts
Performance figures
- Power output: almost 2,000 PS (1,970 hp)
- Tractive effort: 13,180 kp (130 kN; 29,060 lbf)
Career
- Operators: Ouest; → État
- Numbers: Ouest: 2901, 2903; → État: 6001, 6002; → État: 231-001, 231-002
- Withdrawn: 1928

Ouest 2901 and 2902 were two Pacific (4-6-2) steam locomotive built for the Chemins de fer de l'Ouest. They were among the first of their type to be built in France, and with an output of almost 2,000 horsepower, they were the most powerful locomotives in the country at the time of delivery. The two prototypes were built in 1908 and were retired from service in 1928. They didn't lead directly to a series production but influenced the design of the État 231-011 to 231-060, the first Pacifics of the Chemins de fer de l'État.

== Background ==
In anticipation of the increasing weight of trains, the Chemins de fer de l'Ouest decided in 1904 to develop a new type of locomotive for service on the Paris to Brest line, which featured gradients of 10 per mille that slowed down the trains. Under the leadership of Robert Dubois, rolling stock engineer, these locomotives were designed. Unfortunately, financial difficulties delayed the construction of the two prototypes until 1908.

== Design ==
The undercarriage consists of three large driving wheel sets in the middle, a two-axle bogie at the front, and a trailing axle at the rear. This design allowed for a generously sized firebox while ensuring favorable weight distribution. The leading bogie had internal side members and had a lateral displacement of ± 50 mm (1.97 in), while the Bissel truck had a lateral displacement of ± 70 mm (2.76 in). In order to keep a good corenring performance despite of the length of the locomotive, the drivers were positioned as close together as possible, with the front bogie placed as close to them as well. There was only 20 mm (0.79 in) left between the wheel flanges. To prevent overloading of the rear axles, the outside cylinders were mounted at the height of the bogie centre, while the inclined inside cylinders were positioned as far forward as possible.

These non-superheated locomotives featured a four-cylinder compound engine with internal high-pressure cylinder and external low-pressure cylinder, both controlled by Walschaerts valve gears. The low and high-pressure cylinders had separate valve gears. Initially, both valve gears were located outside, despite the high-pressure cylinders being inside. Due to operational issues, the valve gear for the high-pressure cylinders was redesigned and relocated inside.

According to the De Glehn concept, the high-pressure cylinders operated on the first driver and the low-pressure cylinders operated on the second driver.

The locomotives made a strong impression due to their considerable height, featuring a running board completely clear of the wheels. The boiler with Belpaire firebox was unusually long, with a tube length of 6 m (19.69 ft) and a long smokebox which also housed the steam exchange ducts between the groups of cylinders. The blastpipe was of the type used by the Chemins de fer du Nord witch included an adjustable cone. However, the design of the locomotives was criticized for having a narrow cab, a design constraint imposed by the restrictive gauge of the Chemins de fer de l'Ouest.

== Career ==
Upon leaving the company's manufacturing workshop in Sotteville-Quatre-Mares, the 2901 was presented in August 1908 for one month alongside the historic 2-2-2 locomotive No. 33 "St. Pierre", built in 1844 for the Compagnie du chemin de fer de Paris à Rouen, at the Gare Saint-Lazare in Paris. Afterwards, it was assigned to the Batignolles, where valve gear problems emerged from the very beginning of the tests. Necessary adjustments were delayed due to the takeover of the Chemins de fer de l'Ouest by the Chemins de fer de l'État. When time was finally available, additional boiler issues surfaced mainly caused by the very long smoke box.

Tests on the Paris–Le Havre railway and on the Paris to Cherbourg line followed, during which rescue locomotive were frequently needed due to valve gear issues. The locomotives were transferred to the Paris-Vaugirard depot and included in the rotation of the 4-6-0 locomotives of the Ouest 2700 series providing fast express services to Brittany as best they could.

However, the Chemins de fer de l'État could not wait longer for reliabel express train locomotives. They built new Pacific locomotives using the Bissel truck and the boiler from the prototypes, but with longer tubes and a shorter smoke box. The engine was taken from the État 3800 series 4-6-0 locomotives. These new Pacifics were the État 231-011 to 231-060, later known as SNCF 3-231 B 11 to 60.

The État re-registered the locomotives as 6001 and 6002 and transferred them to the Chartres depot. In 1909, they were renumbered to 231.001 and 231.002. By 1910, the new Pacific locomotives displaced the two prototype from the fast express train services to slower trains and even freight train services. Despite not being designed for such services, they towed coal trains to the old Paris-Champ-de-Mars station.

Ultimately, the locomotives were retired in 1928 after a relatively short service period. However, the boiler of one of the prototypes continued to serve as stationary steam generator in the Sotteville workshops.
