= Pacific 231 =

Orchestral work by Arthur Honegger

- Orchestral music by Arthur Honegger
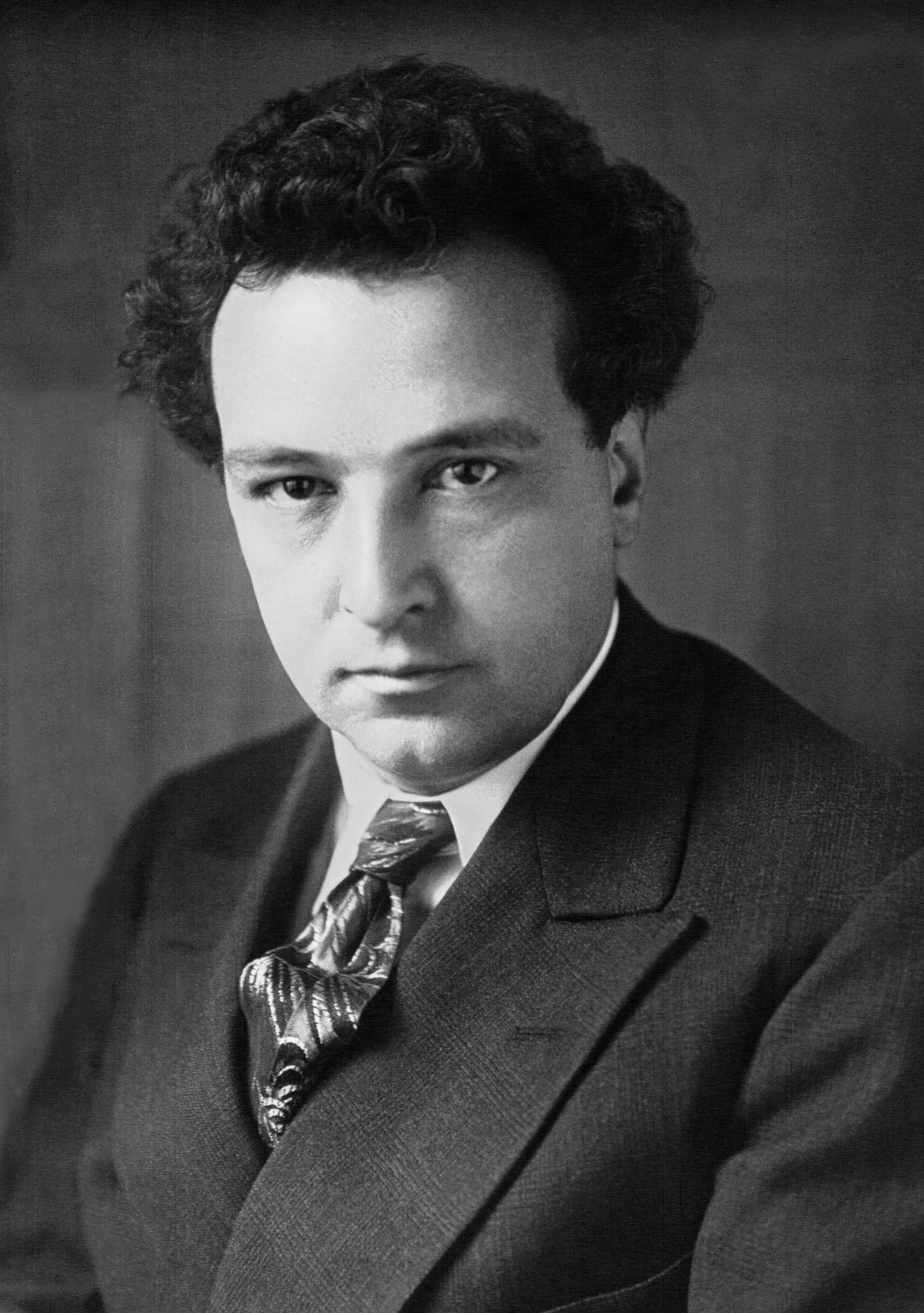
- The composer in 1928
- Other name: Mouvement Symphonique
- Composed: 1923

Pacific 231 is an orchestral work by Arthur Honegger, written in 1923. It is one of his most frequently performed works, and it inspired two film adaptations.

== Description ==
The piece is commonly interpreted as depicting a steam locomotive in action, as appears to be indicated by the title and has been illustrated by film versions of it. However, in an interview, Honegger denied that this was his intended purpose and chided critics who interpreted it thus. He commented:

So many, many critics have so minutely described the onrush of my locomotive across the great spaces that it would be inhuman to disabuse them!... To tell the truth, in Pacific I was on the trail of a very abstract and quite ideal concept, by giving the impression of a mathematical acceleration of rhythm, while the movement itself slowed. Musically, I composed a sort of big, diversified chorale, strewn with counterpoint in the manner of J. S. Bach.

As he further explained elsewhere, the piece is not intended to imitate the literal sounds of a locomotive, but rather to convey a sense of the visual impression and the physical pleasure ("une jouissance physique") he experienced with trains.

== Inspiration ==
He originally titled it Mouvement Symphonique, but after it was finished he changed the name to Pacific 231, a class of steam locomotive designated in Whyte notation as a 4-6-2, with four pilot wheels, six driving wheels, and two trailing wheels. (In France, where axles are counted rather than wheels, this arrangement is designated 2-3-1). Honegger was widely known as a train enthusiast, and once said: "I have always loved locomotives passionately. For me they are living creatures and I love them as others love women or horses."

Harry Halbreich notes that "Eschewing anecdote and the noise music dear to the Italian Futurists or the Mossolov of a certain Steel Foundry, to which it has been wrongly compared, it is a monolith carved out of full granite, as solid as a figured chorale by Bach (its true model)".

== Form ==
The work consists of five main sections, all of which are delineated consecutively through musical motifs, ostinatos, and other textural demarcations. Each of the sounds are elements of a train and the different soundscapes generated before, during, and at the conclusion of its trip.

1. Standstill
2. The start of the locomotive
3. Increasing speed
4. Driving at top speed
5. Deceleration and stop

Accompanying the 1923 published score, Honegger described the long-range form of the work:

"The quiet breathing of the machine at rest, its effort in starting, then the gathering speed, the progress from mood to mood, as a 300-ton train hurtles through the dark night, racing 120 miles an hour."

Harry Halbreich quotes Honegger: "In Pacific I pursued a very abstract and pure idea, giving the impression of a mathematical acceleration of rhythm, while the movement itself slows down. Musically, I composed a kind of great varied chorale, criss-crossed with 'alla breve' counterpoints in the first part, which gives an impression of Johann Sebastian Bach."

== Orchestration ==
Pacific 231 is orchestrated for two flutes, piccolo flute, two oboes, English horn, two clarinets, bass clarinet, two bassoons, contrabassoon, four French horns, three trumpets, three trombones, tuba, four percussionists (tenor drum, cymbal, bass drum, and tam tam) and strings.

The piece is the first in Honegger's series of three symphonic movements. The other two are Rugby and Mouvement Symphonique No. 3. Honegger lamented that his "poor Symphonic Movement No. 3 paid dearly for its barren title". Critics generally ignored it, while Pacific 231 and Rugby, with more evocative titles, have been written about in depth.

== In film ==
Pacific 231 - Soviet film by Mikhail Tsekhanovsky, 1931

Soviet filmmaker Mikhail Tsekhanovsky created a film titled Pacific 231 in 1931. It intercuts shots of a locomotive with an orchestra performing the piece.

A 1949 award-winning French film, Pacific 231, directed by Jean Mitry, used the orchestral work as the soundtrack for a tribute to the steam locomotive, and included close-up footage of the SNCF 231E 24 ex Nord 3.1194. The 10-minute film includes shots of the driving wheels, running gear and railroad operations, mostly taken at speed, and is edited to the music. It was awarded the Short Film Palme d'Or at the Cannes Film Festival—the Festival's highest award for a short film.
