= Sainte-Pazanne station =

Railway station in Sainte-Pazanne, France

Sainte-Pazanne
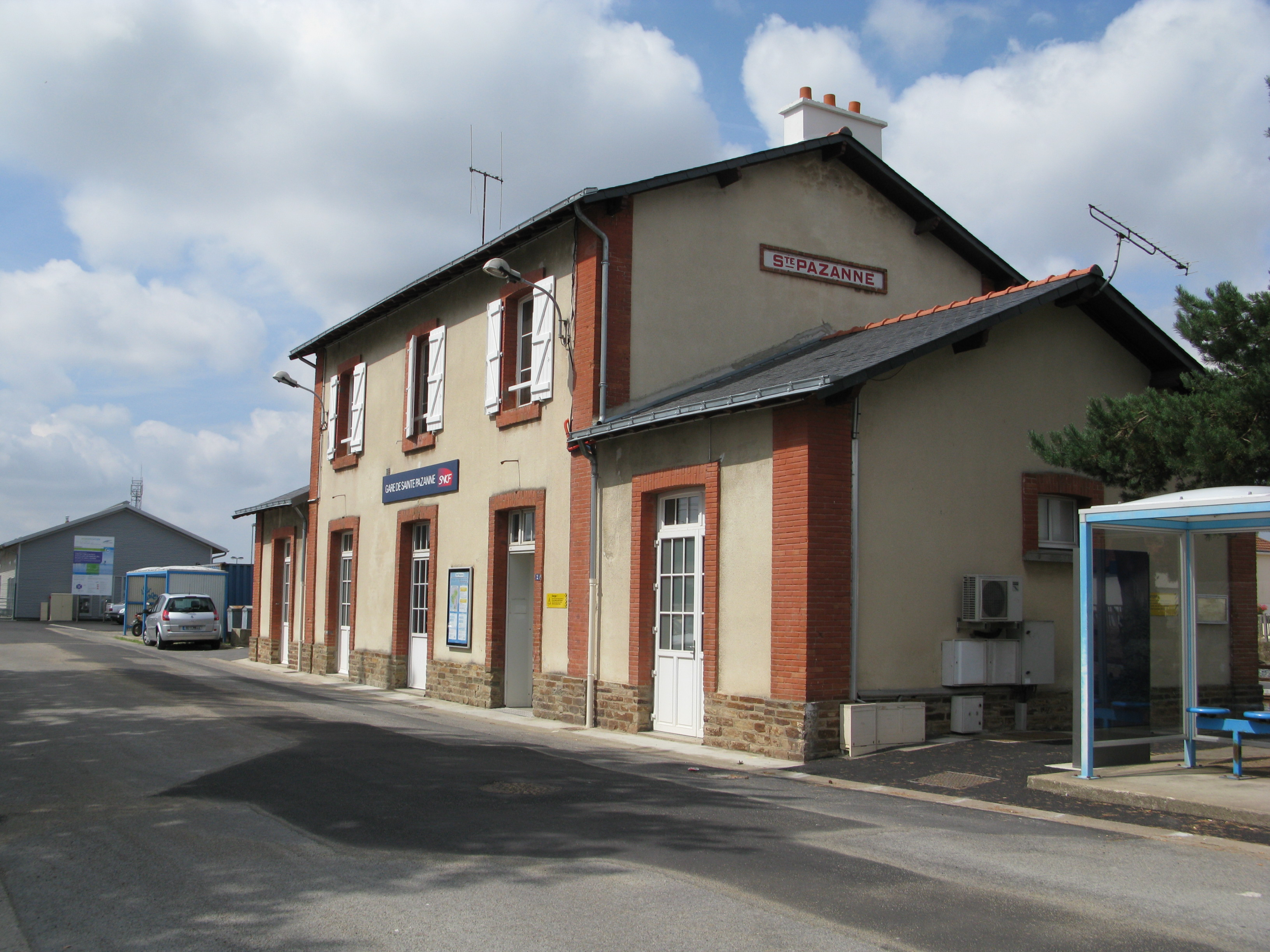
- Sainte-Pazanne railway station

General information
- Location: Sainte-Pazanne, Loire-Atlantique; Pays de la Loire, France
- Coordinates: 47°06′18″N 1°48′52″W
- Lines: Nantes–La Roche-sur-Yon railway Sainte-Pazanne–Pornic railway
- Platforms: 3
- Tracks: 5

Other information
- Station code: 87481226

Services
| Preceding station | TER Pays de la Loire | Following station |
|---|---|---|
| Port-Saint-Père-Saint-Mars towards Nantes | 10 | Saint-Hilaire-de-Chaléons towards Pornic |
| Port-Saint-Père-Saint-Mars towards Nantes | 11 | Machecoul towards Saint-Gilles-Croix-de-Vie |
Location

Sainte-Pazanne is a railway station in Sainte-Pazanne, Pays de la Loire, France. The station is located on the Nantes–La Roche-sur-Yon railway and Sainte-Pazanne–Pornic railway. The station is served by TER (local) services operated by the SNCF:

- local services (TER Pays de la Loire) Nantes - Sainte-Pazanne - Pornic
- local services (TER Pays de la Loire) Nantes - Sainte-Pazanne - Saint-Gilles-Croix-de-Vie
