= Bouaye station =

Railway station in Bouaye, France

Bouaye
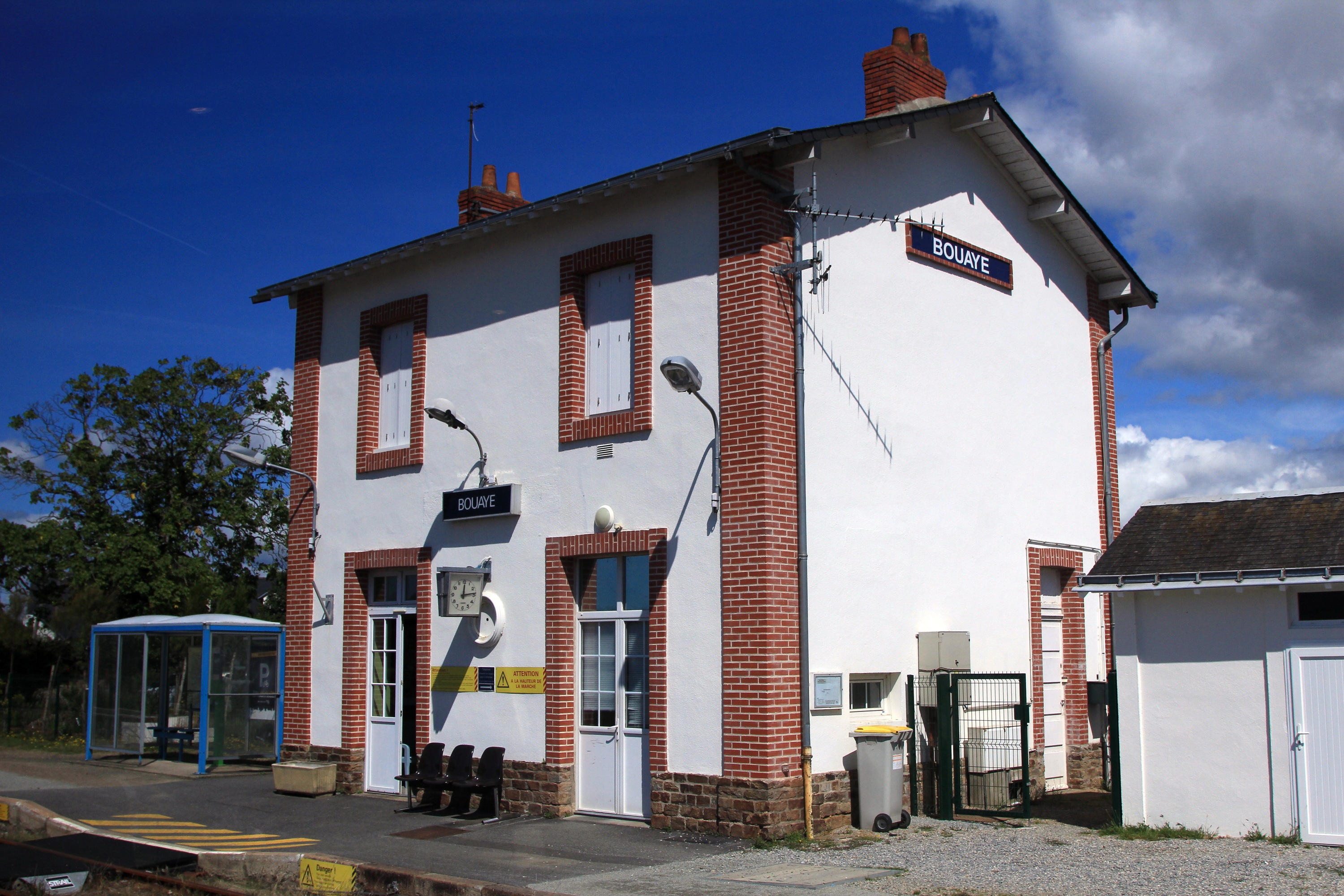
- Bouaye railway station

General information
- Location: Bouaye, Loire-Atlantique; Pays de la Loire, France
- Coordinates: 47°08′17″N 1°40′53″W
- Line: Nantes–La Roche-sur-Yon railway
- Platforms: 2
- Tracks: 2

Other information
- Station code: 87481200

Services
Preceding station	TER Pays de la Loire	Following station
Rezé-Pont-Rousseau towards Nantes	10	Port-Saint-Père–Saint-Mars towards Pornic
Rezé-Pont-Rousseau towards Nantes	11	Port-Saint-Père–Saint-Mars towards Saint-Gilles-Croix-de-Vie
Location

Bouaye is a railway station in Bouaye, Pays de la Loire, France. The station is located on the Nantes–La Roche-sur-Yon railway. The station is served by TER (local) services operated by the SNCF:

- local services (TER Pays de la Loire) Nantes - Sainte-Pazanne - Pornic
- local services (TER Pays de la Loire) Nantes - Sainte-Pazanne - Saint-Gilles-Croix-de-Vie

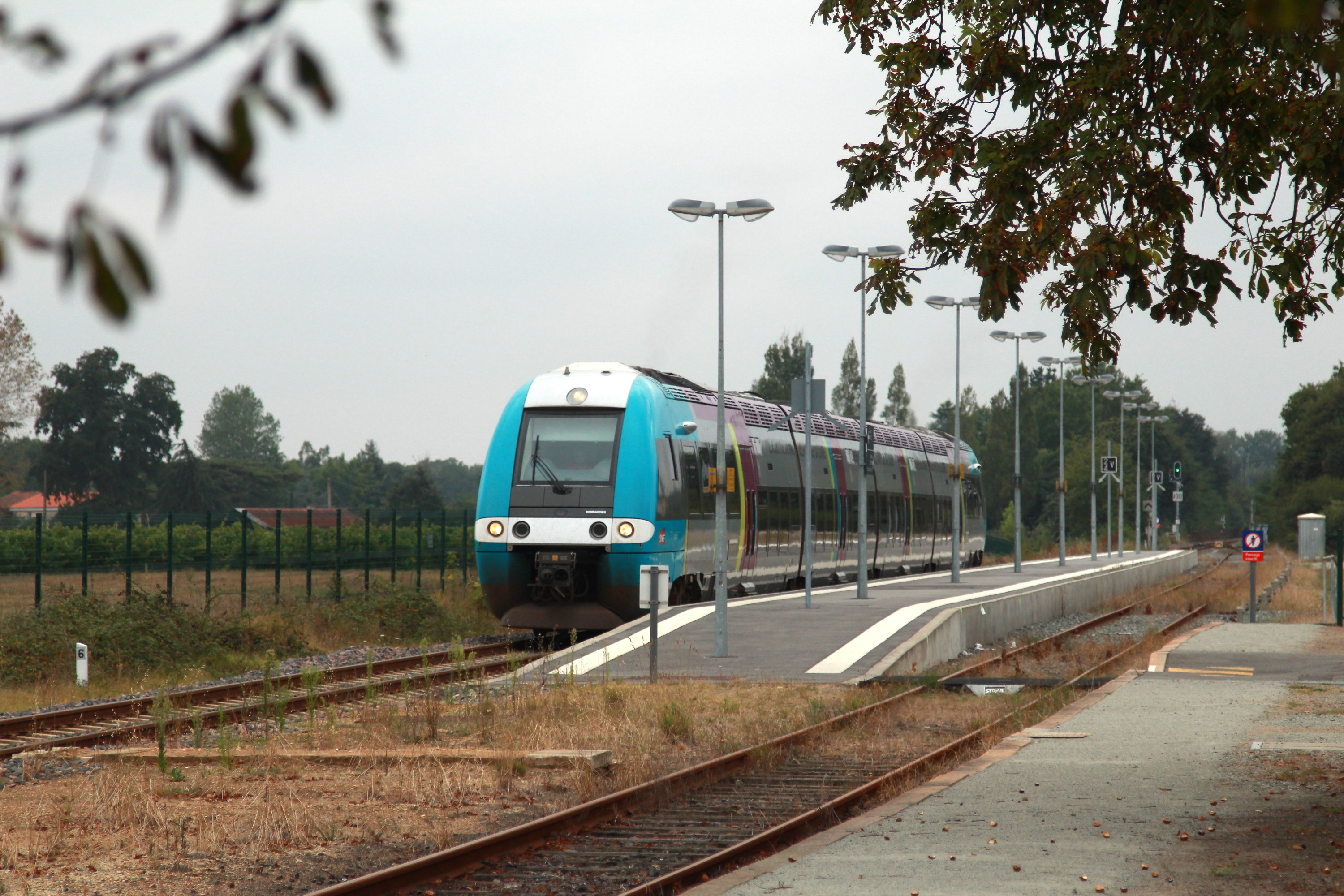
TER, platform and tracks
