= Bouaye =

Bouaye Bóaèy (Gallo) Bouez (Breton)
- Commune
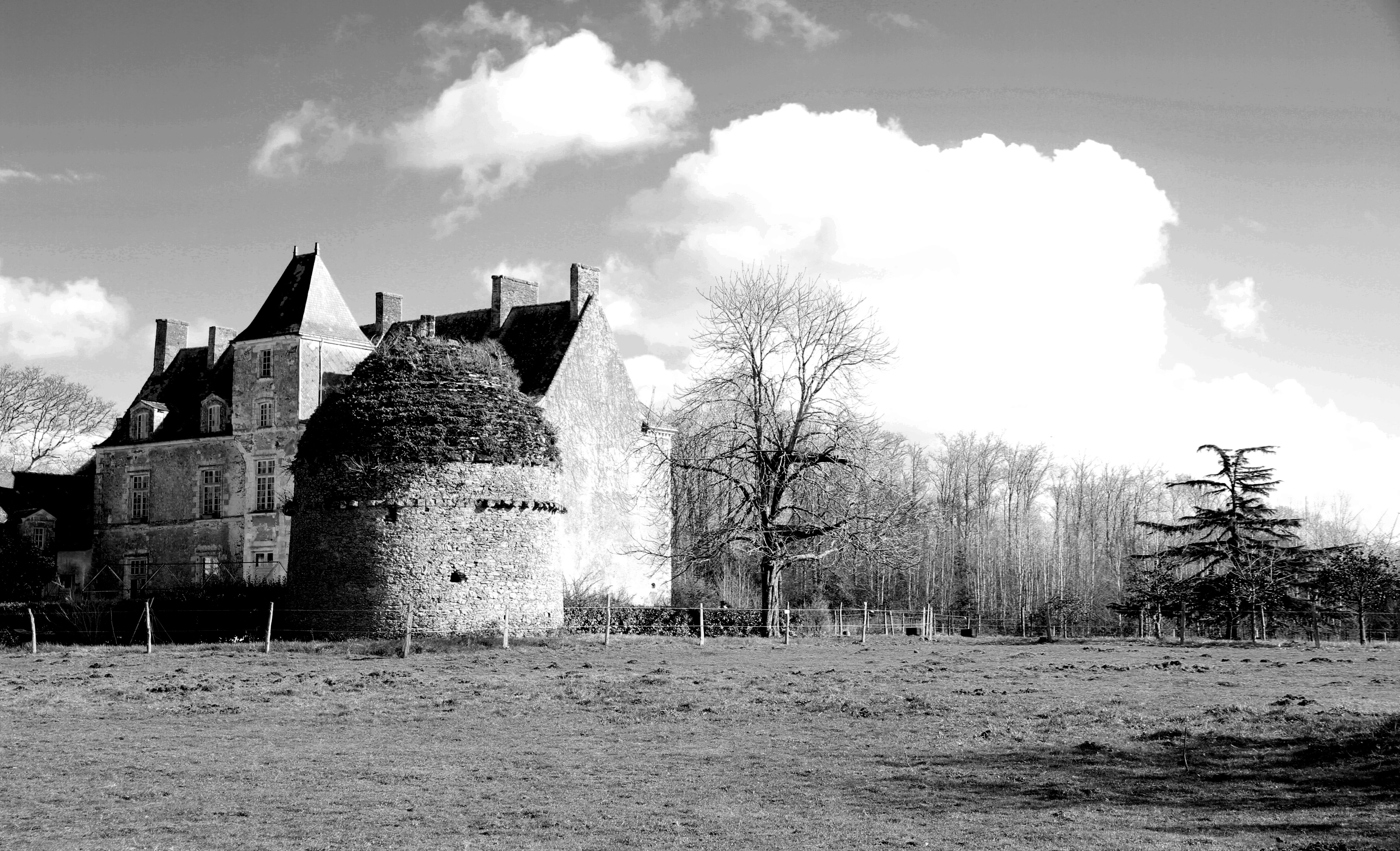
- Logis de la Sénaigerie chateau

- Coat of arms
- Location of Bouaye
- Location within France Location within Pays de la Loire
- Coordinates: 47°08′39″N 1°41′16″W
- Country: France
- Region: Pays de la Loire
- Department: Loire-Atlantique
- Arrondissement: Nantes
- Canton: Rezé-1
- Intercommunality: Nantes Métropole

Government
  - Mayor (2020–2026): Jacques Garreau
- Area^{1}: 13.83 km^{2} (5.34 sq mi)
- Highest elevation: 34 m (112 ft)
- Lowest elevation: 0 m (0 ft)
- Population (2023): 8,343
  - Density: 603.3/km^{2} (1,562/sq mi)
- Time zone: UTC+01:00 (CET)
  - Summer (DST): UTC+02:00 (CEST)
- INSEE/Postal code: 44018 /44830
- ^{1} French Land Register data, which excludes lakes, ponds, glaciers > 1 km^{2} (0.386 sq mi or 247 acres) and river estuaries.

Bouaye (French pronunciation: [bwɛ] or [bwɛj]; Gallo: Bóaèy, Breton: Bouez) is a commune in the Loire-Atlantique department in western France.

== History ==
Until the Second World War, Bouaye was primarily a rural commune. The technological advances of the 19th century, along with the development of road and rail infrastructure, encouraged the commune's slow transformation.

=== Before the 20th century ===
The sedentary lifestyle of humans on the commune's land, linked to the proximity of Lake Grand-lieu, is attested from prehistoric times. In the 7th century, Saint-Hermeland came to evangelize the population.

The land was then entirely covered by forest. It took the community five centuries of labor to clear the land, clearing forest for meadows and fields. Many plots of land have retained their names from the time when the inhabitants uprooted the forest: Bois-de-la-Noé, Ville-en-Bois, l'Épine, and Petit-Bois.

The population grew very quickly. In the 15th century, Bouaye already had 500 inhabitants. Vineyard cultivation was already widespread. Grapes were pressed at the Château de la Sénaigerie.

From 1580, the rector administered the parish and kept the civil status registers. The clergy held this position until the French Revolution. A first mayor was appointed in November 1792.

In 1826, the first cadastral documents were drawn up. They estimated the municipal area at 1,349 hectares, 54 ares, and 68 centiares.

A cantonal capital created during the Revolution, Bouaye experienced real administrative growth with its justice of the peace, its revision council, and its gendarmerie.

=== Bouaye in the 20th century ===
The 20th century would further refine this development with electrification and the advent of the automobile.

The Bosc landscape was changing, as were mentalities. The 1914-1918 war would indirectly result in the "emancipation of women." Headdresses would be relegated to the back of the drawer. Bouaye then had 1,205 inhabitants.

The general post-war expansion gradually transformed Bouaye into a peri-urban commune. Its privileged location at the gates of Nantes, on the beach road, close to industrial centers, ensured its fast development. Amidst the ever-present vineyard landscape, traditional housing has given way to single-family homes.

The commune of Bouaye's connection to the Nantes metropolitan area, cemented by public transportation and the construction of a public high school, now characterizes it.

=== "Bouaye History" Association ===
"Bouaye History" is available to assist and implement any local history research; preserve and develop the cultural, historical and archival heritage of the commune of Bouaye; and make known to the general public, through various means of communication, the results of its research.

== Population ==
Historical population

Year	Pop.	±% p.a.
1793	1,465	—
1800	834	−7.73%
1806	1,042	+3.78%
1821	1,123	+0.50%
1831	1,297	+1.45%
1841	1,298	+0.01%
1846	1,304	+0.09%
1851	1,332	+0.43%
1856	1,294	−0.58%
1861	1,388	+1.41%
1866	1,397	+0.13%
1872	1,340	−0.69%
1876	1,383	+0.79%
1881	1,437	+0.77%
1886	1,409	−0.39%
1891	1,420	+0.16%
1896	1,433	+0.18%
1901	1,400	−0.46%

Year	Pop.	±% p.a.
1906	1,469	+0.97%
1911	1,389	−1.11%
1921	1,215	−1.33%
1926	1,267	+0.84%
1931	1,279	+0.19%
1936	1,264	−0.24%
1946	1,355	+0.70%
1954	1,406	+0.46%
1962	1,520	+0.98%
1968	1,607	+0.93%
1975	2,209	+4.65%
1982	3,445	+6.55%
1990	4,815	+4.27%
1999	5,251	+0.97%
2007	5,672	+0.97%
2012	6,160	+1.66%
2017	7,844	+4.95%
2023	8,343	+1.03%

Source: EHESS and INSEE (1968-2023)

== Transport ==
Bouaye station is served by train services between Pornic, Saint-Gilles-Croix-de-Vie and Nantes.

== See also ==
- Communes of the Loire-Atlantique department
