= Aiffres to Ruffec railway line =

Railway line in France

The Aiffres to Ruffec railway line was a railway in the south west of France which served the route between Niort, Aiffres, Melle, Brioux-sur-Boutonne, Chef-Boutonne and Ruffec (Charente).

== History ==
The first proposals to link Ruffec to Niort dated from 1853. There were plans to make a branch from Aiffres, near Niort on the Bordeaux - Chartres line.

The line was declared of public utility by imperial decree on June 19, 1868. It was granted to the Compagnie des chemins de fer des Charentes on a definitive basis by a law on March 23, 1874.

The company was purchased by the State under the terms of an agreement signed on March 31, 1877 between the Minister of Public Works and the company. This redemption was approved by law on May 18, 1878. The line (which was under construction at the time) was then incorporated into the network of the state railway administration Chemin de Fer de l'Etat.

Four options for the route were initially proposed, and one serving both Melle and Brioux was finally selected. The line was double track from Ruffec to La Faye, the remainder being single track.

The metre gauge secondary railway line of the CFD Réseau des Charentes et Deux-Sèvres from Saint-Jean-d'Angély to Saint-Saviol, opened in 1896, crossed the Aiffres to Ruffec line near the station of Chef -Boutonne.

The line was commissioned on February 23, 1885 and closed to passenger traffic on October 2, 1938. Parts of the route remained in service for freight traffic until 1991.

== Operation ==
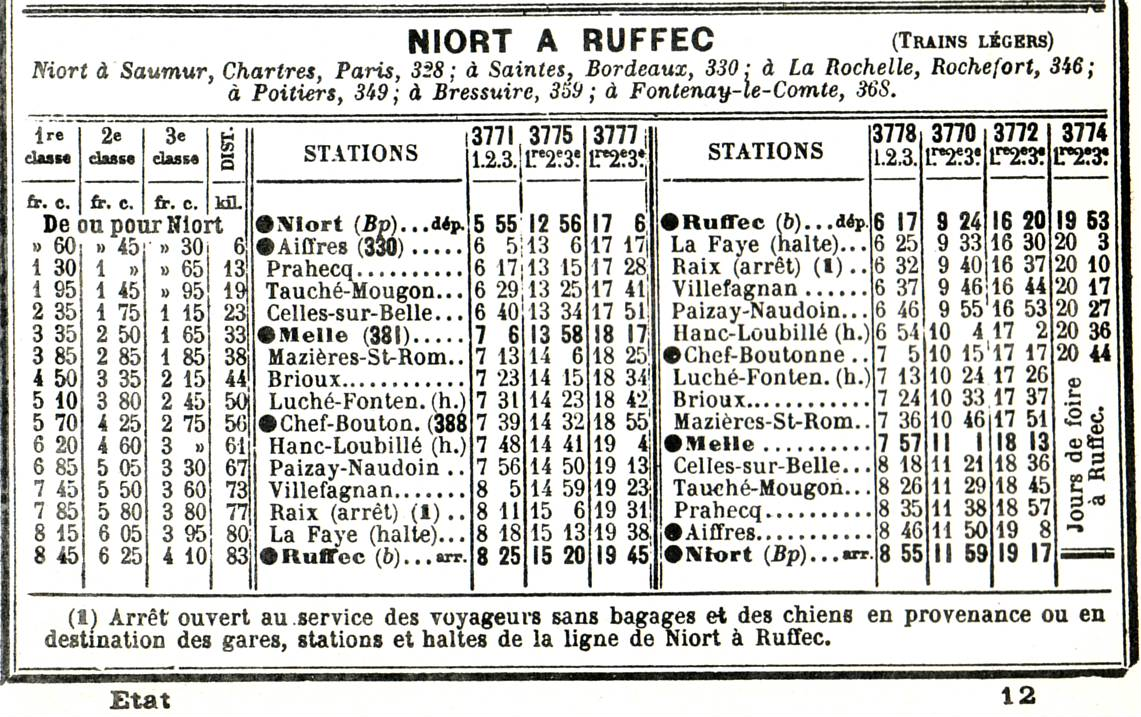
Niort to Ruffec railway timetable, May 1914

There were three round trips of passenger trains and two of freight trains per day. They travelled the entire line in three hours in 1885, about two and a half hours in 1914 and then two hours in 1937.

== Decline and closure ==
The increased use of cars and coaches led to a drop in passenger numbers. When the SNCF took over the line, they decided to close the line to passenger traffic. Road coaches transported passengers while the line only accommodated freight traffic. In 1949, local elected officials succeeded in obtaining the restoration of passenger traffic with railcars. This service continued until 1954, and the same year freight traffic on the Chef-Boutonne to Ruffec section was suspended. No more trains ran from 1977 between Melle and Chef-Boutonne with the end of freight trains on this section. The final freight service to run was between Niort and the Rhône-Poulenc factory in Melle, which ceased in January 1991. In 2011, only the Niort - Prahecq section remained.

The formal dates of closure were:

- Chef-Boutonne to Paizay-Naudoin (PK 49,790 to 60,900): November 12, 1954
- Paizay-Naudoin to Ruffec (PK 60,900 to 76,500): May 24, 1960
- Melle to Chef-Boutonne (PK 27,290 to 49,790): January 29, 1979
- Prahecq to Melle (PK 5,350 to 27,290): November 10, 1993

== Locomotives and rolling stock ==
Types of locomotives used on the line included:

- Compagnie des Charentes 120 series 2000 until 1929
- 121B from 1900 to 1938
- 030-100 from 1914
- 141 from 1920 to 1936
- 220B-500 from 1930
- 230G-800 from 1940s to 1957
- 140C from 1913
- 131T from 1955
- BB 63000 from 1964

== Infrastructure ==
Five stations were proposed when the line was built:

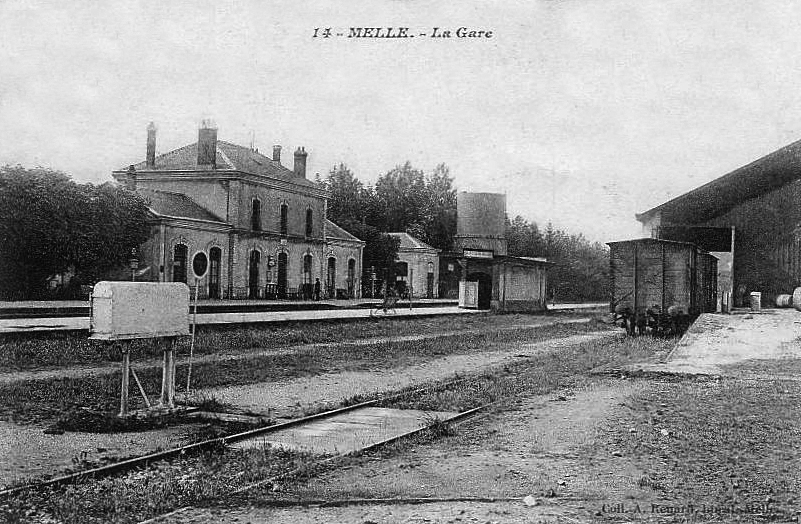
1900s postcard of Melle station

- Tauche Mougon
- Celles
- Melle
- Brioux sur Boutonne
- Chef-Boutonne

== Continued use of the route ==
In 1987, a 6 km arboretum and botanic garden trail were created on the trackbed and former sidings through Melle, with more than 1000 species of plants.

In 1999, the 9 km section between Celles-sur-Belles and Melle was converted into a walking, cycling and horse riding trail, known as the 'Ruban Vert' and became part of a national network of 'voies vertes'. It was later extended further along the railway route to Prahecq, to a full length of 14.5 km.

In 2020, a section of the route near Brioux-sur-Boutonne was subject to archaeological excavation prior to development of the site. The route of the railway was identified but no significant remains were reported.
