= Port-Saint-Père–Saint-Mars station =

Railway station in Saint-Mars-de-Coutais, Pays de la Loire, France

Port-Saint-Père–Saint-Mars
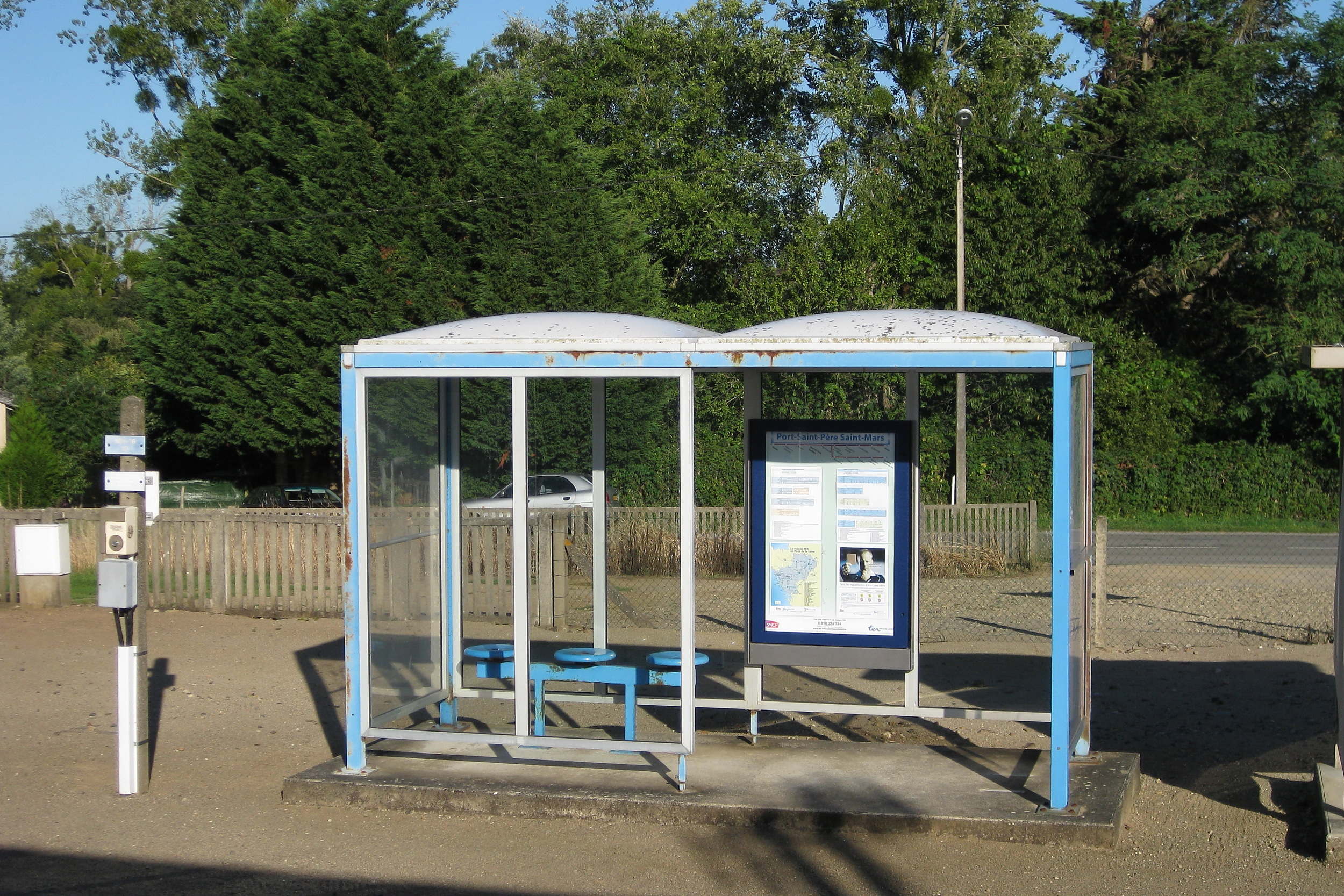
- Port-Saint-Père–Saint-Mars railway station

General information
- Location: Saint-Mars-de-Coutais, Loire-Atlantique; Pays de la Loire, France
- Coordinates: 47°07′00″N 1°44′22″W
- Line: Nantes–La Roche-sur-Yon railway
- Platforms: 1
- Tracks: 1

Other information
- Station code: 87481218

Services
Preceding station	TER Pays de la Loire	Following station
Bouaye towards Nantes	10	Sainte-Pazanne towards Pornic
Bouaye towards Nantes	11	Sainte-Pazanne towards Saint-Gilles-Croix-de-Vie
Location

Port-Saint-Père–Saint-Mars is a railway station in Saint-Mars-de-Coutais, Pays de la Loire, France. The station is located on the Nantes–La Roche-sur-Yon railway. The station is served by TER (local) services operated by the SNCF:

- local services (TER Pays de la Loire) Nantes - Sainte-Pazanne - Pornic
- local services (TER Pays de la Loire) Nantes - Sainte-Pazanne - Saint-Gilles-Croix-de-Vie
