= Rezé-Pont-Rousseau station =

Railway station in Rezé, France

Rezé-Pont-Rousseau
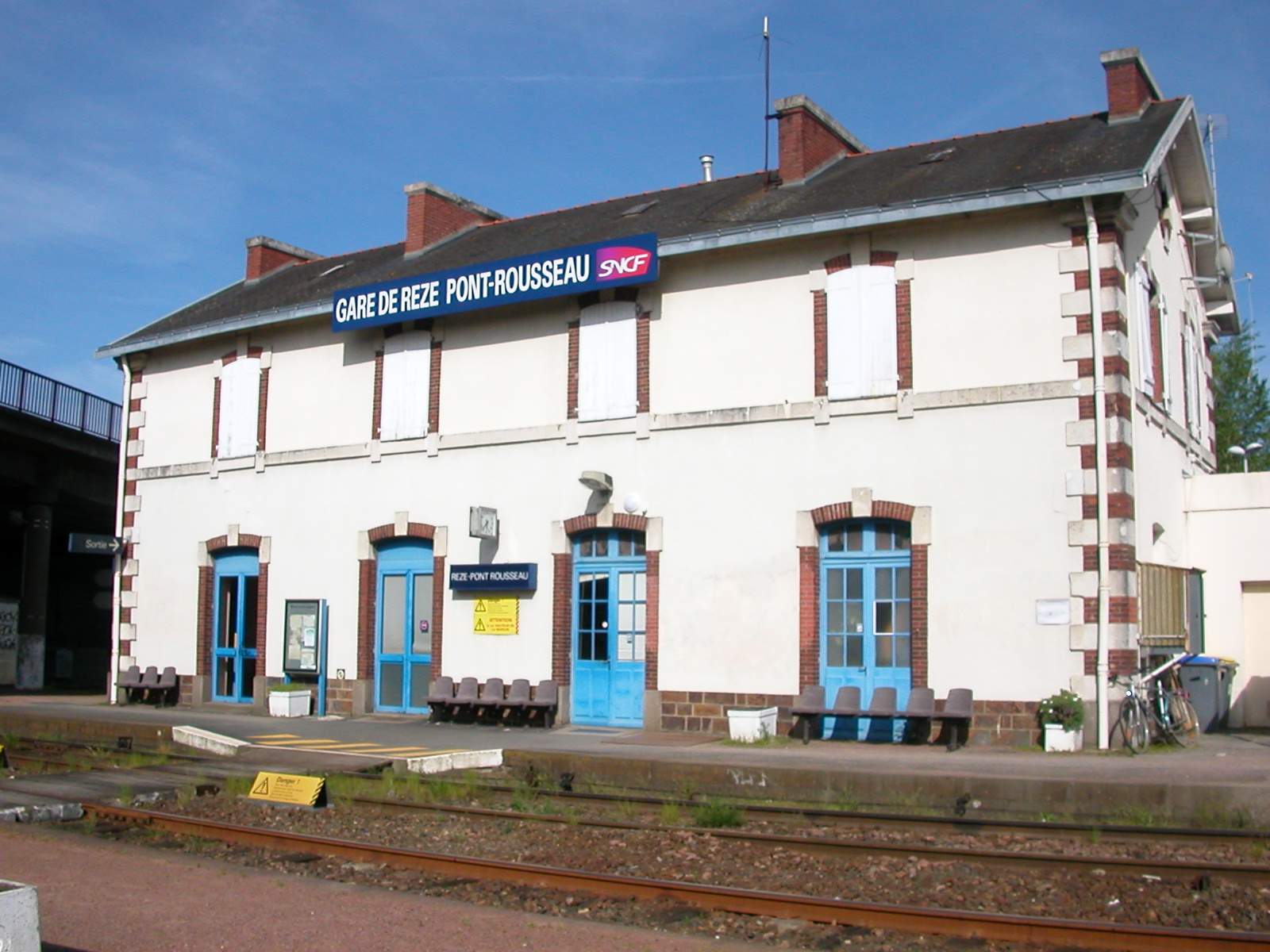
- Rezé-Pont-Rousseau railway station

General information
- Location: Rezé, Loire-Atlantique; Pays de la Loire, France
- Coordinates: 47°11′3″N 1°33′00″W
- Line: Nantes–La Roche-sur-Yon railway
- Platforms: 2
- Tracks: 2

Other information
- Station code: 87481036

Services
Preceding station	TER Pays de la Loire	Following station
Nantes Terminus	10	Bouaye towards Pornic
Nantes Terminus	11	Bouaye towards Saint-Gilles-Croix-de-Vie
Location

Rezé-Pont-Rousseau is a railway station in Rezé, Pays de la Loire, France. The station is located on the Nantes–La Roche-sur-Yon railway. The station is served by the following TER Pays de la Loire services operated by the SNCF:

- local services Nantes - Sainte-Pazanne - Pornic
- local services Nantes - Sainte-Pazanne - Saint-Gilles-Croix-de-Vie

The station is also served by Nantes Tramway line 2.
