= Saint-Mars-de-Coutais =

- Commune
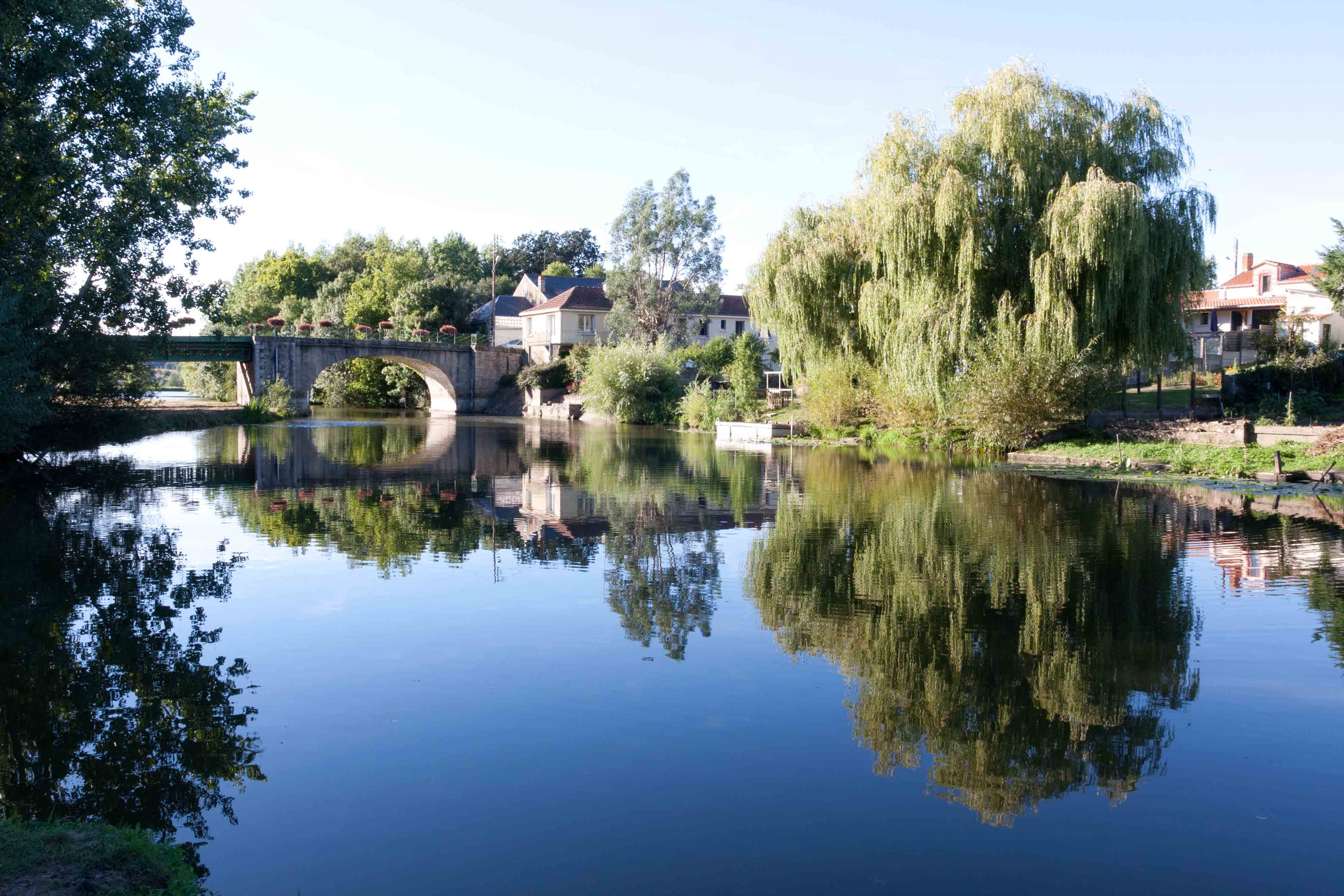
- A general view of Saint-Mars-de-Coutais

- Coat of arms
- Location of Saint-Mars-de-Coutais
- Location within France Location within Pays de la Loire
- Coordinates: 47°06′48″N 1°44′04″W
- Country: France
- Region: Pays de la Loire
- Department: Loire-Atlantique
- Arrondissement: Nantes
- Canton: Machecoul-Saint-Même
- Intercommunality: Sud Retz Atlantique

Government
  - Mayor (2020–2026): Jean Charrier
- Area^{1}: 34.67 km^{2} (13.39 sq mi)
- Elevation: 7 m (23 ft)
- Highest elevation: 38 m (125 ft)
- Lowest elevation: 0 m (0 ft)
- Population (2023): 2,698
  - Density: 77.82/km^{2} (201.6/sq mi)
- Time zone: UTC+01:00 (CET)
  - Summer (DST): UTC+02:00 (CEST)
- INSEE/Postal code: 44178 /44680
- ^{1} French Land Register data, which excludes lakes, ponds, glaciers > 1 km^{2} (0.386 sq mi or 247 acres) and river estuaries.

Saint-Mars-de-Coutais (French pronunciation: [sɛ̃ maʁ də kutɛ]; Breton: Sant-Marzh-ar-C'hoad) is a commune in the Loire-Atlantique department in western France.

== Population ==
Historical population
Year	Pop.	±% p.a.
1968	1,231	—
1975	1,266	+0.40%
1982	1,518	+2.63%
1990	1,744	+1.75%
1999	1,858	+0.71%
2007	2,432	+3.42%
2012	2,558	+1.02%
2017	2,610	+0.40%
2023	2,698	+0.55%
Source: INSEE

== Transport ==
Gare de Port-Saint-Père-Saint-Mars is served by train services between Pornic, Saint-Gilles-Croix-de-Vie and Nantes.

== See also ==
- Communes of the Loire-Atlantique department
