= État 231-011 to 231-060 =

État 231-011 to 231-060 SNCF 3-231.B
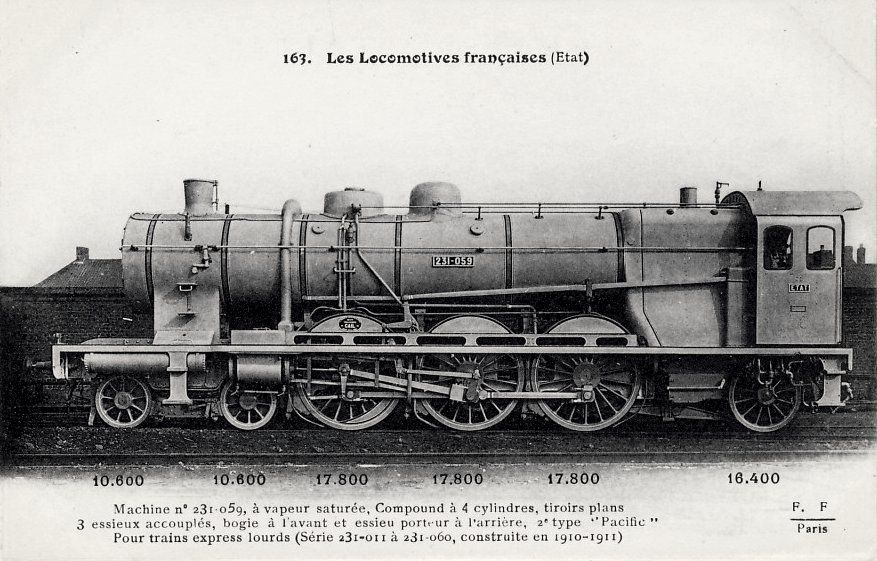
- 231-059 in a postcard derived from a manufacturer's photograph
Type and origin
- Power type: Steam
- Builder: Fives-Lille (20); Schneider et Cie. (20); SFCM (10)
- Build date: 1910
- Total produced: 50
Specifications
- Configuration
  - Whyte: 4-6-2
  - UIC: 2′C1′ n4v
- Gauge: 1,435 mm (4 ft 8 1/2 in)
- Driver dia.: 1,850 mm (6 ft 0.83 in)
- Loco weight: 91.0 tonnes (89.6 long tons; 100.3 short tons)
- Tender weight: 51.0 tonnes (50.2 long tons; 56.2 short tons)
- Fuel type: Coal
- Fuel capacity: 6.0 tonnes (5.9 long tons; 6.6 short tons)
- Water cap.: 22,000 litres (4,800 imp gal; 5,800 US gal)
- Firebox
  - Grate area: 3.84 m^{2} (41.3 sq ft)
- Boiler pressure: 16 kg/cm^{2} (1.57 MPa; 228 psi)
- Heating surface: 296.0 m^{2} (3,186 sq ft)
- Cylinders: Four, compound: two high pressure, two low pressure
- High-pressure cylinder: 380 mm × 640 mm (14.96 in × 25.20 in)
- Low-pressure cylinder: 600 mm × 640 mm (23.62 in × 25.20 in)
Performance figures
- Power output: 1,665 hp (1,241.59 kW)
Career
- Operators: Chemin de fer de l'État → SNCF
- Class: SNCF: 3-231.B
- Numbers: État: 231-011 to 231-060; SNCF: 3-231.B.1 to 3-231.B.60
- Nicknames: Dieppoises

État 231-011 to 231-060 was a small class of 4-6-2 steam locomotive of the Chemin de fer de l'État.

This series of 50 locomotives was built during 1910. After some difficult early days (involving a number of derailments), the locomotives later became part of the SNCF's 3-231.B class. The class was initially numbered 231-011 to 231-060 by the Chemin de fer de l'État and then 3-231.B.1 to 3-231.B.60 by the SNCF.

The design of the 231s was based on two locomotives types: the boiler was the one used in the Ouest 2900 series Pacific. They were coupled to 22 cubic metre tenders and were very sober in appearance.

These locomotives had a tendency to derail which forced the Chemin de fer de l'État to change the leading bogies. Two of these accidents happened at Perray and at Bernay on 10 September 1910.

After that, the locomotives were temporarily used solely on goods trains and limited to a maximum speed of 60 km/h. Once the locomotives had their leading bogies modified they were reallocated to passenger service in 1912.

From 1912, the locomotives were allocated to Batignolles and Vaugirard and mainly pulled express trains to Le Havre, Cherbourg, Le Mans, Thouars and on the Deauville Express.

Around 1922, half the class was moved to Dieppe which gave the class the nickname of Dieppoises. They were used to pull the express from Gare Saint-Lazare to Dieppe via Pontoise. From 1929, the class was responsible for pulling the expresses between Dieppe and Le Mans and the Manche-Océan, between Dieppe and Bordeaux.

Several locomotives had smoke deflectors installed in 1931 as well as ACFI feedwater heaters. The class was renumbered 231.B.1 to 231.B.60 in 1938.

Around 1945, a project to increase the locomotives' power to 1,700 hp (1,300 kW) to create a class of 231.L engines failed. The locomotives were used until 1957 when the last of the locomotives was withdrawn from service.
