= Saint-Yzan-de-Soudiac =

- Commune
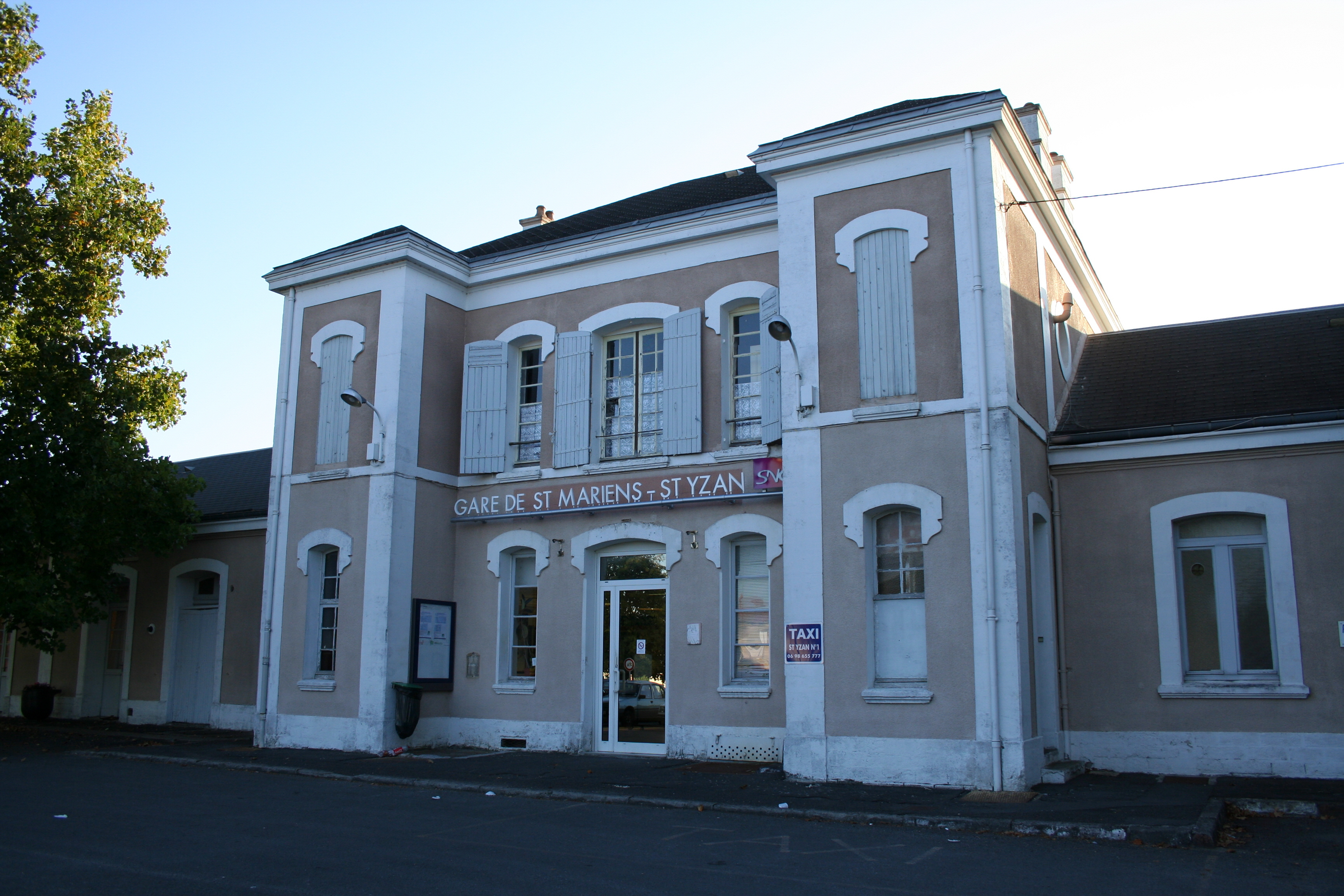
- Train station
- Location of Saint-Yzan-de-Soudiac
- Location within France Location within Nouvelle-Aquitaine
- Coordinates: 45°08′28″N 0°24′34″W
- Country: France
- Region: Nouvelle-Aquitaine
- Department: Gironde
- Arrondissement: Blaye
- Canton: Le Nord-Gironde
- Intercommunality: Latitude Nord Gironde

Government
  - Mayor (2020–2026): Didier Bernard
- Area^{1}: 11.14 km^{2} (4.30 sq mi)
- Highest elevation: 92 m (302 ft)
- Lowest elevation: 35 m (115 ft)
- Population (2023): 2,586
  - Density: 232.1/km^{2} (601.2/sq mi)
- Time zone: UTC+01:00 (CET)
  - Summer (DST): UTC+02:00 (CEST)
- INSEE/Postal code: 33492 /33920
- ^{1} French Land Register data, which excludes lakes, ponds, glaciers > 1 km^{2} (0.386 sq mi or 247 acres) and river estuaries.

Saint-Yzan-de-Soudiac (French pronunciation: [sɛ̃.t‿izɑ̃ də sudjak]) is a commune in the Gironde department in Nouvelle-Aquitaine in southwestern France.

== Population ==
Historical population
Year	Pop.	±% p.a.
1968	1,393	—
1975	1,384	−0.09%
1982	1,552	+1.65%
1990	1,461	−0.75%
1999	1,530	+0.51%
2007	1,799	+2.05%
2012	2,265	+4.71%
2017	2,380	+1.00%
2023	2,586	+1.39%
Source: INSEE

== See also ==
- Communes of the Gironde department
