= Bordeaux État station =

Former railway station, Bordeaux, France

Coordinates: 44°50′19″N 0°33′15″W

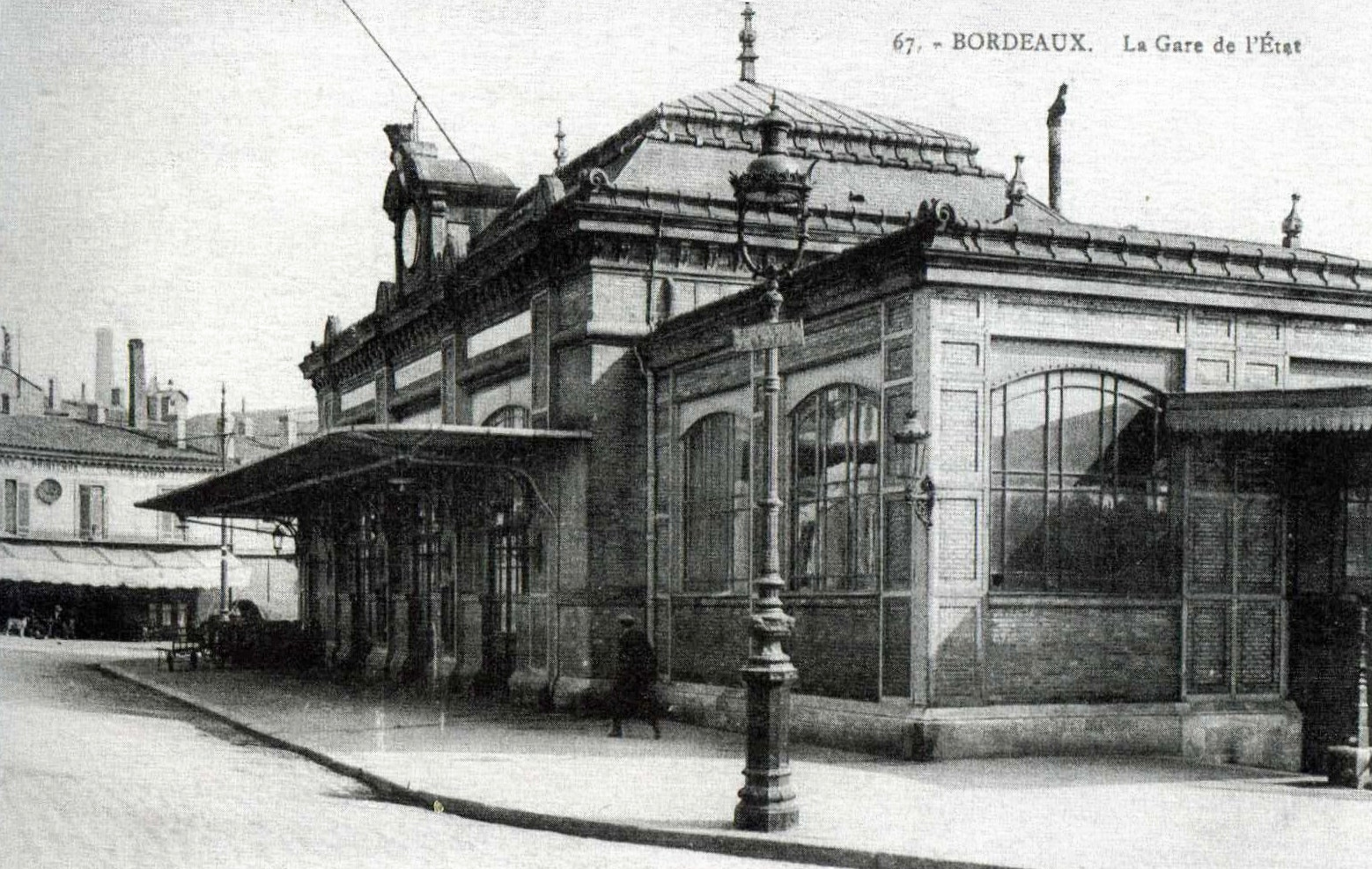
Gare de Bordeaux-État

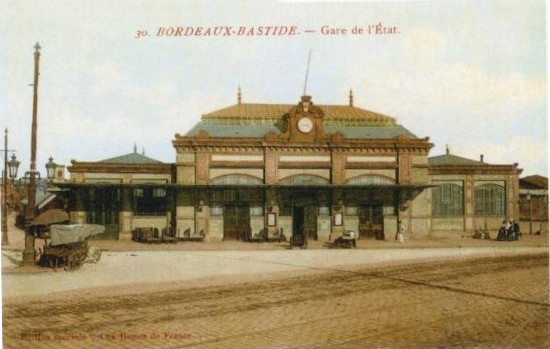

Bordeaux-État or Bordeaux-Deschamps was a mainline railway station in the French city of Bordeaux.

The station was at the terminus of the line from Paris of the CF de l'État. The station opened late on 1 August 1896 after years of building a line to compete with the PO's line also from Paris.

On 1 August 1893, the last portion of the main line was opened and État trains were permitted to use the Midi's Gare de Bordeaux Saint-Jean station. Three years later, the 2 km long branch to Bordeaux-État was opened as well as the station. Only a small number of trains ever used the station as most were routed to Saint-Jean to allow passengers to use connecting services.

Bordeaux-État was closed at the creation of the SNCF and all services were rerouted to Saint-Jean. The station was situated near the Pont de Pierre and was subsequently converted into a cinema and restaurants.

== See also ==
- Gare de Bordeaux Saint-Jean (Midi)
- Gare de Bordeaux Passerelle (PO)
- Gare de Bordeaux Bastide (PO)
- Gare de Bordeaux Saint-Louis
- Gare de Bordeaux Ségur
- Gare de Bordeaux Bénauge (PO-Midi-État)
