= Saint-Mariens =

- Commune
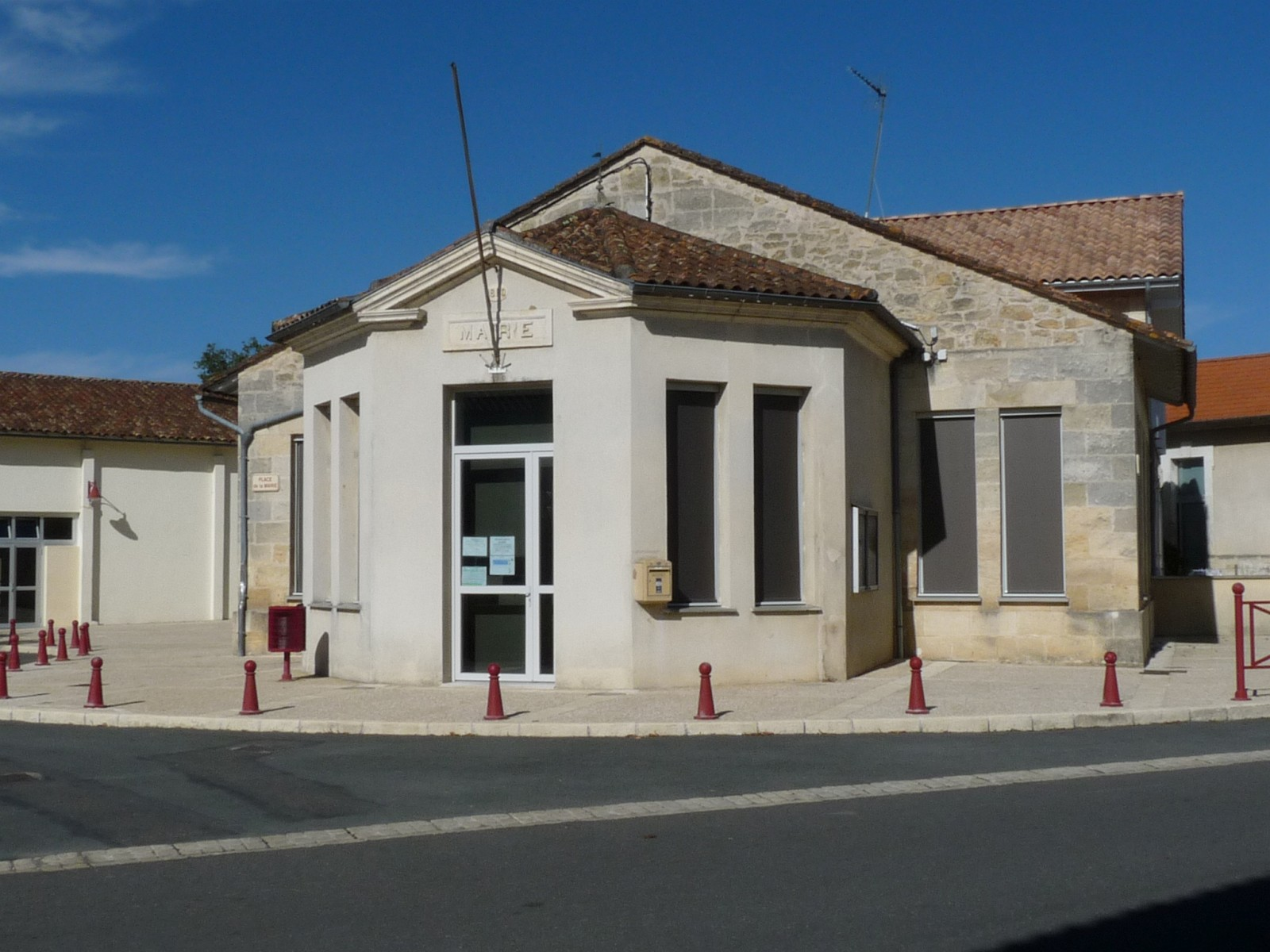
- The town hall in Saint-Mariens
- Location of Saint-Mariens
- Location within France Location within Nouvelle-Aquitaine
- Coordinates: 45°07′03″N 0°24′06″W
- Country: France
- Region: Nouvelle-Aquitaine
- Department: Gironde
- Arrondissement: Blaye
- Canton: Le Nord-Gironde
- Intercommunality: Latitude Nord Gironde

Government
  - Mayor (2020–2026): Marcel Bourreau
- Area^{1}: 12 km^{2} (4.6 sq mi)
- Elevation: 45 m (148 ft)
- Highest elevation: 98 m (322 ft)
- Lowest elevation: 29 m (95 ft)
- Population (2023): 1,639
  - Density: 140/km^{2} (350/sq mi)
- Time zone: UTC+01:00 (CET)
  - Summer (DST): UTC+02:00 (CEST)
- INSEE/Postal code: 33439 /33620
- ^{1} French Land Register data, which excludes lakes, ponds, glaciers > 1 km^{2} (0.386 sq mi or 247 acres) and river estuaries.

Saint-Mariens (French pronunciation: [sɛ̃ maʁjɛ̃]) is a commune in the Gironde department in Nouvelle-Aquitaine in southwestern France.

== Population ==
Historical population
Year	Pop.	±% p.a.
1968	794	—
1975	812	+0.32%
1982	864	+0.89%
1990	1,015	+2.03%
1999	1,177	+1.66%
2007	1,400	+2.19%
2012	1,570	+2.32%
2017	1,602	+0.40%
2023	1,639	+0.38%
Source: INSEE

== See also ==
- Communes of the Gironde department
