= Sainte-Pazanne =

- Commune
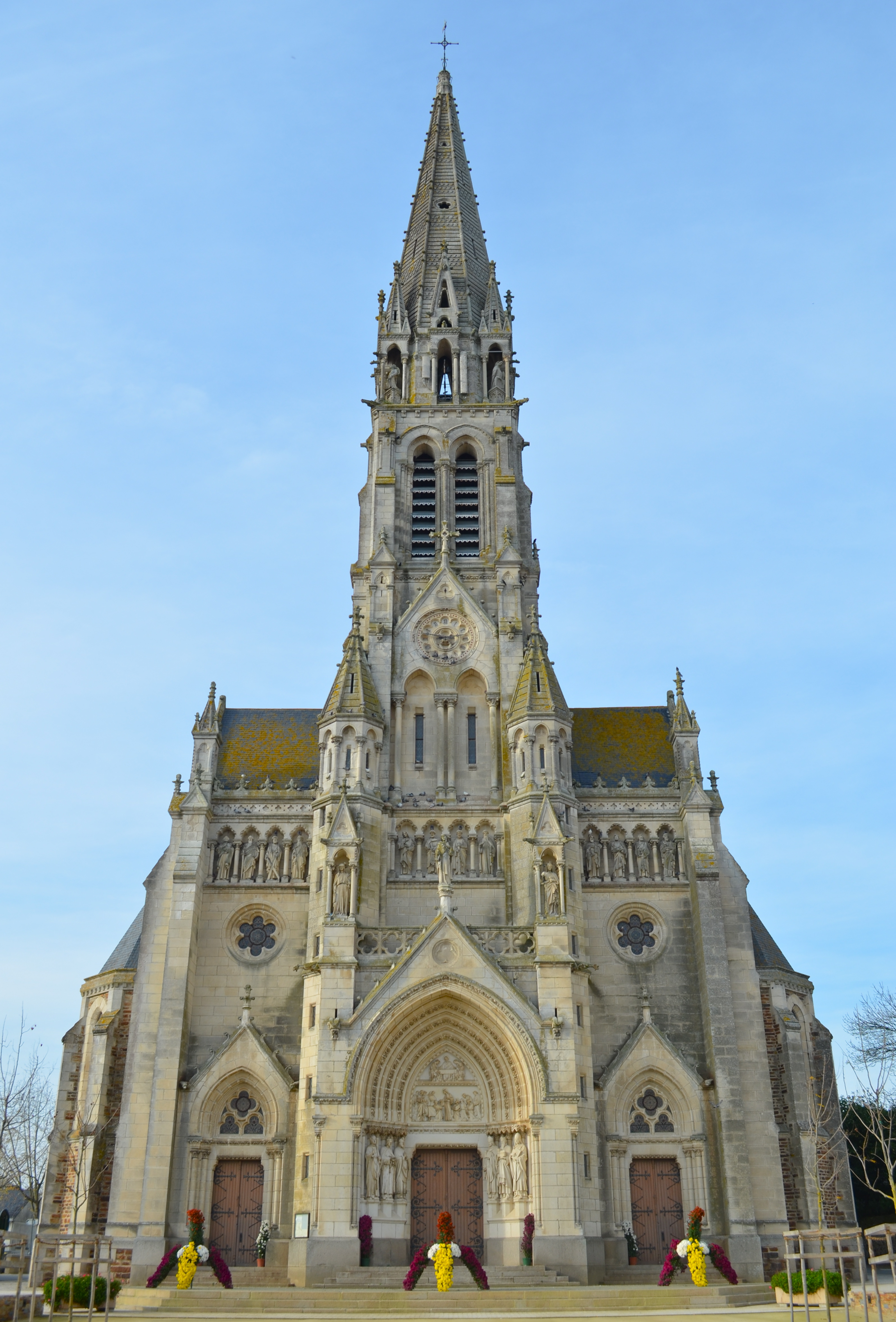

- Coat of arms
- Location of Sainte-Pazanne
- Location within France Location within Pays de la Loire
- Coordinates: 47°06′14″N 1°48′34″W
- Country: France
- Region: Pays de la Loire
- Department: Loire-Atlantique
- Arrondissement: Nantes
- Canton: Machecoul-Saint-Même
- Intercommunality: CA Pornic Agglo Pays de Retz

Government
  - Mayor (2020–2026): Bernard Morilleau
- Area^{1}: 41.56 km^{2} (16.05 sq mi)
- Elevation: 14 m (46 ft)
- Highest elevation: 41 m (135 ft)
- Lowest elevation: 0 m (0 ft)
- Population (2023): 7,201
  - Density: 173.3/km^{2} (448.8/sq mi)
- Time zone: UTC+01:00 (CET)
  - Summer (DST): UTC+02:00 (CEST)
- INSEE/Postal code: 44186 /44680
- ^{1} French Land Register data, which excludes lakes, ponds, glaciers > 1 km^{2} (0.386 sq mi or 247 acres) and river estuaries.

Sainte-Pazanne (French pronunciation: [sɛ̃t pazan]; Breton: Santez-Pezhenn) is a commune in the Loire-Atlantique department, western France.

== Population ==
Historical population

Year	Pop.	±% p.a.
1800	1,656	—
1806	1,901	+2.33%
1821	1,872	−0.10%
1831	1,909	+0.20%
1841	2,121	+1.06%
1846	2,161	+0.37%
1851	2,202	+0.38%
1856	2,180	−0.20%
1861	2,363	+1.63%
1866	2,486	+1.02%
1872	2,458	−0.19%
1876	2,421	−0.38%
1881	2,456	+0.29%
1886	2,460	+0.03%
1891	2,576	+0.93%
1896	2,687	+0.85%
1901	2,714	+0.20%
1906	2,696	−0.13%

Year	Pop.	±% p.a.
1911	2,650	−0.34%
1921	2,324	−1.30%
1926	2,191	−1.17%
1931	2,191	+0.00%
1936	2,229	+0.34%
1946	2,234	+0.02%
1954	2,320	+0.47%
1962	2,439	+0.63%
1968	2,527	+0.59%
1975	2,645	+0.65%
1982	2,940	+1.52%
1990	3,159	+0.90%
1999	3,448	+0.98%
2007	4,946	+4.61%
2012	5,863	+3.46%
2017	6,774	+2.93%
2023	7,201	+1.02%

Source: EHESS and INSEE (1968-2023)

== Twin towns ==
- (United Kingdom) Harrold, Bedfordshire

== Transport ==
Gare de Sainte-Pazanne is served by train services between Pornic, Saint-Gilles-Croix-de-Vie and Nantes.

== See also ==
- Communes of the Loire-Atlantique department
