= Cavignac =

- Commune
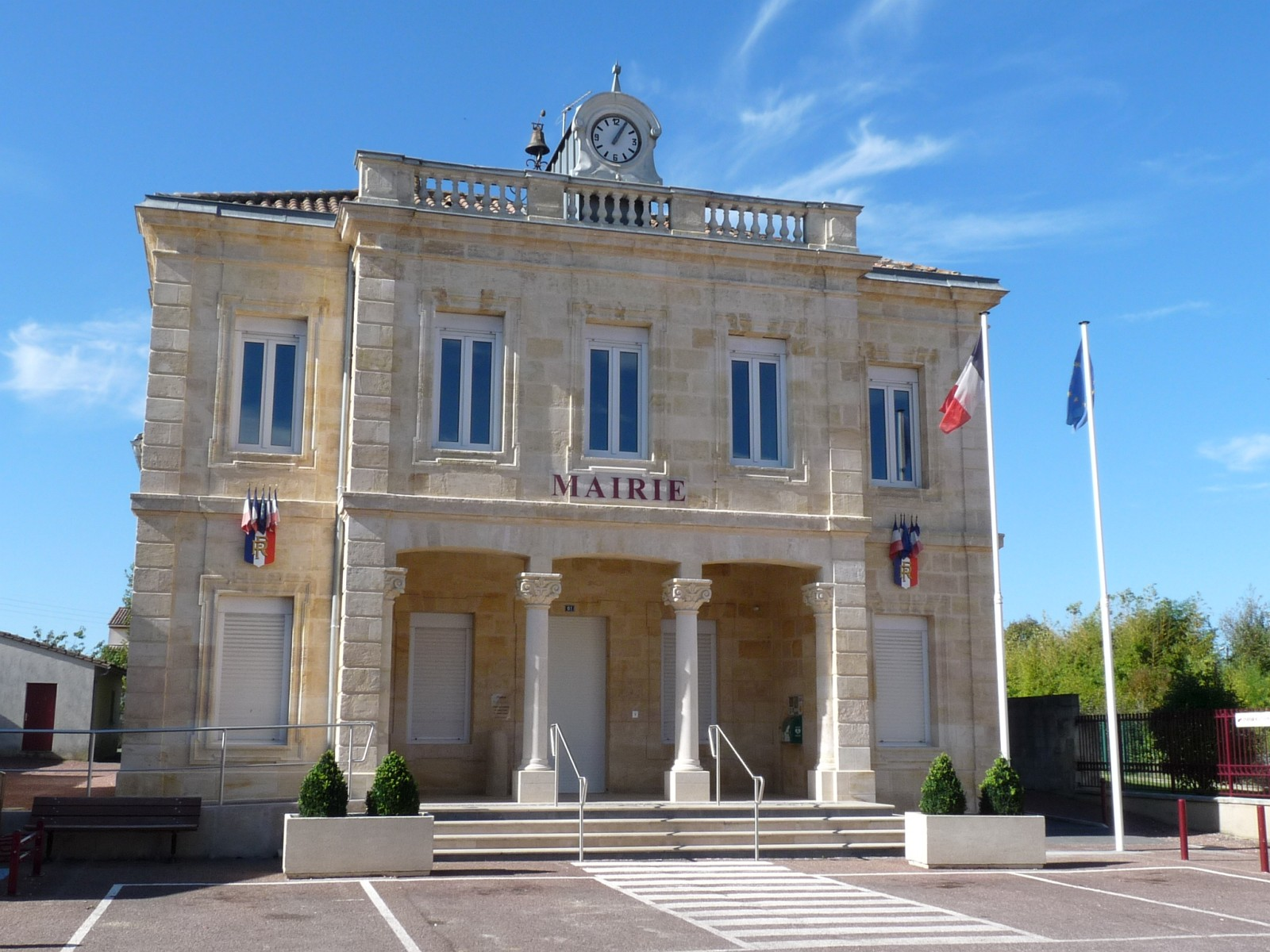
- The town hall in Cavignac

- Coat of arms
- Location of Cavignac
- Location within France Location within Nouvelle-Aquitaine
- Coordinates: 45°06′06″N 0°23′20″W
- Country: France
- Region: Nouvelle-Aquitaine
- Department: Gironde
- Arrondissement: Blaye
- Canton: Le Nord-Gironde

Government
  - Mayor (2020–2026): Guillaume Charrier
- Area^{1}: 6.63 km^{2} (2.56 sq mi)
- Elevation: 46 m (151 ft)
- Highest elevation: 77 m (253 ft)
- Lowest elevation: 22 m (72 ft)
- Population (2023): 2,372
  - Density: 358/km^{2} (927/sq mi)
- Time zone: UTC+01:00 (CET)
  - Summer (DST): UTC+02:00 (CEST)
- INSEE/Postal code: 33114 /33620
- ^{1} French Land Register data, which excludes lakes, ponds, glaciers > 1 km^{2} (0.386 sq mi or 247 acres) and river estuaries.

Cavignac (French pronunciation: [kaviɲak]) is a commune in the Gironde department in Nouvelle-Aquitaine in southwestern France.

== Population ==
Historical population

Year	Pop.	±% p.a.
1793	479	—
1800	482	+0.09%
1806	523	+1.37%
1821	604	+0.96%
1831	715	+1.70%
1836	702	−0.37%
1841	736	+0.95%
1846	721	−0.41%
1851	773	+1.40%
1856	715	−1.55%
1861	723	+0.22%
1866	744	+0.57%
1872	713	−0.71%
1876	814	+3.37%
1881	842	+0.68%
1886	901	+1.36%
1891	917	+0.35%
1896	905	−0.26%
1901	936	+0.68%

Year	Pop.	±% p.a.
1906	957	+0.44%
1911	905	−1.11%
1921	1,015	+1.15%
1926	1,045	+0.58%
1931	986	−1.16%
1936	953	−0.68%
1946	949	−0.04%
1954	1,035	+1.09%
1962	1,068	+0.39%
1968	1,059	−0.14%
1975	1,244	+2.33%
1982	1,260	+0.18%
1990	1,135	−1.30%
1999	1,190	+0.53%
2007	1,526	+3.16%
2012	1,763	+2.93%
2017	2,065	+3.21%
2023	2,372	+2.34%

Source: EHESS and INSEE (1968-2023)

== See also ==
- Communes of the Gironde department
