= Aiffres =

- Commune
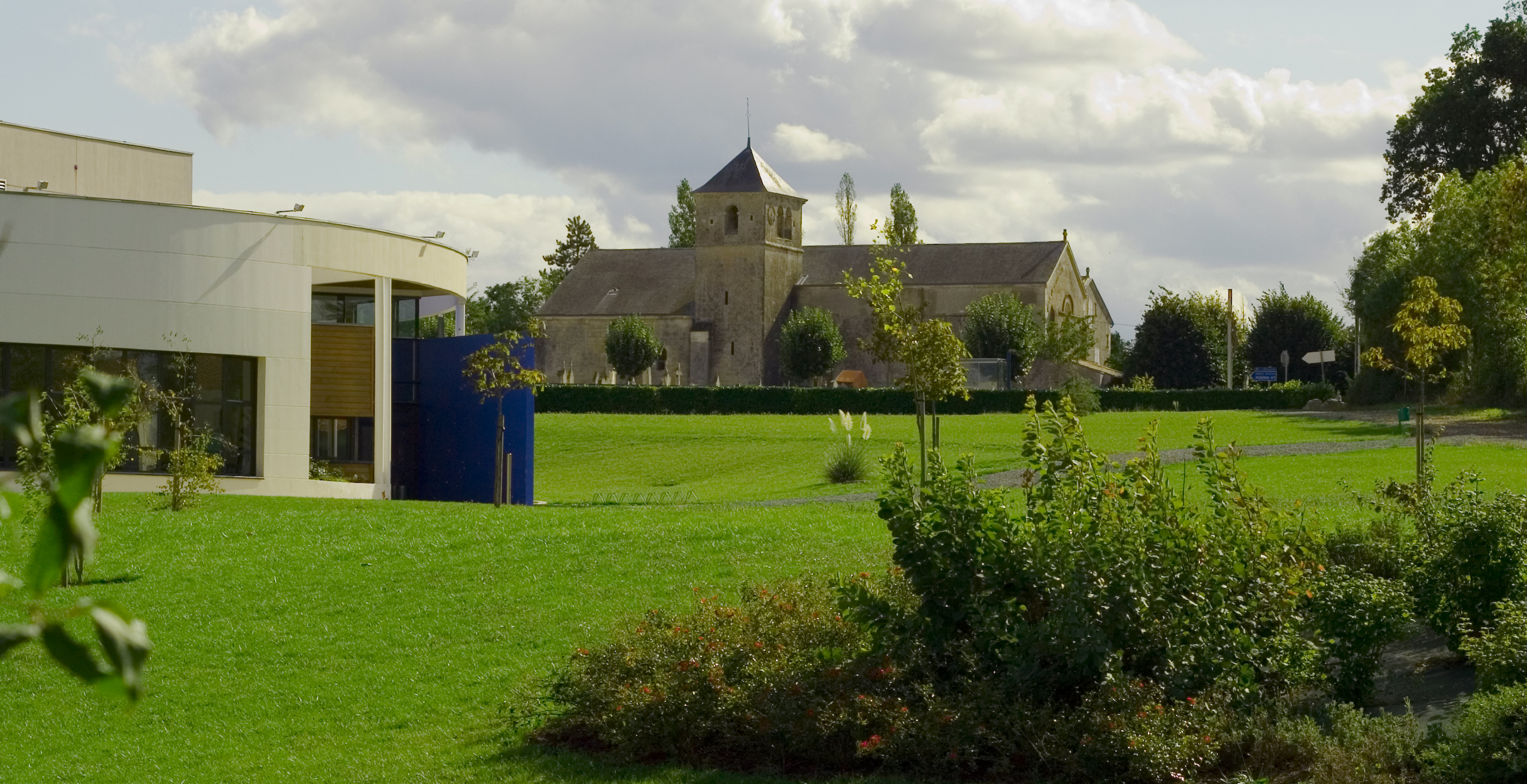
- The church of Saint-Pierre
- Location of Aiffres
- Location within France Location within Nouvelle-Aquitaine
- Coordinates: 46°17′14″N 0°24′57″W
- Country: France
- Region: Nouvelle-Aquitaine
- Department: Deux-Sèvres
- Arrondissement: Niort
- Canton: La Plaine Niortaise
- Intercommunality: Niortais

Government
  - Mayor (2020–2026): Jacques Billy
- Area^{1}: 25.72 km^{2} (9.93 sq mi)
- Elevation: 26 m (85 ft)
- Highest elevation: 57 m (187 ft)
- Lowest elevation: 13 m (43 ft)
- Population (2023): 5,419
  - Density: 210.7/km^{2} (545.7/sq mi)
- Time zone: UTC+01:00 (CET)
  - Summer (DST): UTC+02:00 (CEST)
- INSEE/Postal code: 79003 /79230
- ^{1} French Land Register data, which excludes lakes, ponds, glaciers > 1 km^{2} (0.386 sq mi or 247 acres) and river estuaries.

Aiffres (French pronunciation: [ɛfʁ]) is a commune in the Deux-Sèvres department in the Nouvelle-Aquitaine region in western France. It is a southeastern suburb of Niort.

== Population ==
Historical population
Year	Pop.	±% p.a.
1968	1,323	—
1975	1,861	+5.00%
1982	3,756	+10.55%
1990	4,119	+1.16%
1999	4,598	+1.23%
2007	5,046	+1.17%
2012	5,360	+1.21%
2017	5,506	+0.54%
2023	5,419	−0.27%
Source: INSEE

== See also ==
- Communes of the Deux-Sèvres department
