= Allonne, Deux-Sèvres =

Allonne
- Commune
- Location of Allonne
- Location within France Location within Nouvelle-Aquitaine
- Coordinates: 46°34′55″N 0°22′58″W
- Country: France
- Region: Nouvelle-Aquitaine
- Department: Deux-Sèvres
- Arrondissement: Parthenay
- Canton: La Gâtine
- Intercommunality: CC Parthenay-Gâtine

Government
  - Mayor (2020–2026): Emmanuel Allard
- Area^{1}: 23 km^{2} (8.9 sq mi)
- Highest elevation: 234 m (768 ft)
- Lowest elevation: 145 m (476 ft)
- Population (2023): 608
  - Density: 26/km^{2} (68/sq mi)
- Time zone: UTC+01:00 (CET)
  - Summer (DST): UTC+02:00 (CEST)
- INSEE/Postal code: 79007 /
- ^{1} French Land Register data, which excludes lakes, ponds, glaciers > 1 km^{2} (0.386 sq mi or 247 acres) and river estuaries.

Allonne (French pronunciation: [alɔn]) is a commune in the Deux-Sèvres department in the Nouvelle-Aquitaine region in western France. It is situated some 5 km southeast of Secondigny and 14 km southwest of the town of Parthenay.

== See also ==
- Communes of the Deux-Sèvres department
