= Le Retail =

- Commune
- Location of Le Retail
- Location within France Location within Nouvelle-Aquitaine
- Coordinates: 46°33′43″N 0°26′46″W
- Country: France
- Region: Nouvelle-Aquitaine
- Department: Deux-Sèvres
- Arrondissement: Parthenay
- Canton: La Gâtine
- Intercommunality: CC Parthenay-Gâtine

Government
  - Mayor (2020–2026): Véronique Gilbert
- Area^{1}: 14 km^{2} (5.4 sq mi)
- Highest elevation: 243 m (797 ft)
- Lowest elevation: 112 m (367 ft)
- Population (2023): 276
  - Density: 20/km^{2} (51/sq mi)
- Time zone: UTC+01:00 (CET)
  - Summer (DST): UTC+02:00 (CEST)
- INSEE/Postal code: 79226 /
- ^{1} French Land Register data, which excludes lakes, ponds, glaciers > 1 km^{2} (0.386 sq mi or 247 acres) and river estuaries.

Le Retail (French pronunciation: [lə ʁətaj]) is a commune in the Deux-Sèvres department in western France.

It is situated some 7 km south of Secondigny, 20 km southwest of Parthenay and 33 km north of Niort.

== See also ==
- Communes of the Deux-Sèvres department
