= Vouhé =

Vouhé may refer to the following places in France:

- Vouhé, Charente-Maritime, a commune in the Charente-Maritime department
- Vouhé, Deux-Sèvres, a commune in the Deux-Sèvres department
