= Fénery =

- Commune
- Location of Fénery
- Location within France Location within Nouvelle-Aquitaine
- Coordinates: 46°41′17″N 0°21′47″W
- Country: France
- Region: Nouvelle-Aquitaine
- Department: Deux-Sèvres
- Arrondissement: Parthenay
- Canton: Parthenay
- Intercommunality: CC Parthenay-Gâtine

Government
  - Mayor (2020–2026): Alexandre Martin
- Area^{1}: 13 km^{2} (5.0 sq mi)
- Highest elevation: 236 m (774 ft)
- Lowest elevation: 169 m (554 ft)
- Population (2023): 293
  - Density: 23/km^{2} (58/sq mi)
- Time zone: UTC+01:00 (CET)
  - Summer (DST): UTC+02:00 (CEST)
- INSEE/Postal code: 79118 /
- ^{1} French Land Register data, which excludes lakes, ponds, glaciers > 1 km^{2} (0.386 sq mi or 247 acres) and river estuaries.

Fénery is a commune in the Deux-Sèvres department, in the Nouvelle-Aquitaine region in western France. It is situated about 11 km (6.8 mi) northwest of the town of Parthenay.

In 2010, the commune of Fénery joined the Communauté de communes de Parthenay, which was established in 2001 by six other local communes and provides a framework within which local tasks are carried out together. This intercommunality was merged into the Communauté de communes de Parthenay-Gâtine in 2014.

== See also ==
- Communes of the Deux-Sèvres department
