= Saint-Martin-du-Fouilloux =

Saint-Martin-du-Fouilloux may refer to the following places in France:

- Saint-Martin-du-Fouilloux, Maine-et-Loire, a commune in the Maine-et-Loire department
- Saint-Martin-du-Fouilloux, Deux-Sèvres, a commune in the Deux-Sèvres department
