= La Chapelle-Bertrand =

- Commune
- Location of La Chapelle-Bertrand
- Location within France Location within Nouvelle-Aquitaine
- Coordinates: 46°37′16″N 0°10′20″W
- Country: France
- Region: Nouvelle-Aquitaine
- Department: Deux-Sèvres
- Arrondissement: Parthenay
- Canton: Parthenay
- Intercommunality: CC Parthenay-Gâtine
- Area^{1}: 19 km^{2} (7.3 sq mi)
- Population (2023): 465
  - Density: 24/km^{2} (63/sq mi)
- Time zone: UTC+01:00 (CET)
  - Summer (DST): UTC+02:00 (CEST)
- INSEE/Postal code: 79071 /
- ^{1} French Land Register data, which excludes lakes, ponds, glaciers > 1 km^{2} (0.386 sq mi or 247 acres) and river estuaries.

La Chapelle-Bertrand (French pronunciation: [la ʃapɛl bɛʁtʁɑ̃]) is a village and commune in the Deux-Sèvres department of the Nouvelle-Aquitaine region in western France. It is situated some 7 km south-east of the town of Parthenay.

The commune of La Chapelle-Bertrand has joined together with 37 neighbouring communes to establish the Communauté de communes de Parthenay-Gâtine which provides a framework within which local tasks are carried out together.

== See also ==
- Communes of the Deux-Sèvres department
