= Le Tallud =

- Commune
- Location of Le Tallud
- Location within France Location within Nouvelle-Aquitaine
- Coordinates: 46°37′51″N 0°17′51″W
- Country: France
- Region: Nouvelle-Aquitaine
- Department: Deux-Sèvres
- Arrondissement: Parthenay
- Canton: Parthenay
- Intercommunality: CC Parthenay-Gâtine

Government
  - Mayor (2020–2026): Didier Voy
- Area^{1}: 19 km^{2} (7.3 sq mi)
- Highest elevation: 201 m (659 ft)
- Lowest elevation: 132 m (433 ft)
- Population (2023): 1,961
  - Density: 100/km^{2} (270/sq mi)
- Time zone: UTC+01:00 (CET)
  - Summer (DST): UTC+02:00 (CEST)
- INSEE/Postal code: 79322 /
- ^{1} French Land Register data, which excludes lakes, ponds, glaciers > 1 km^{2} (0.386 sq mi or 247 acres) and river estuaries.

Le Tallud (French pronunciation: [lə taly]) is a village and commune in the Deux-Sèvres department of the Nouvelle-Aquitaine region in western France. It is situated on the River Thouet some 5 km west of the town of Parthenay.

The commune of Le Tallud has joined together with 37 neighbouring communes to establish the Communauté de communes de Parthenay-Gâtine which provides a framework within which local tasks are carried out together.

== See also ==
- Communes of the Deux-Sèvres department
