= Communes of the Deux-Sèvres department =

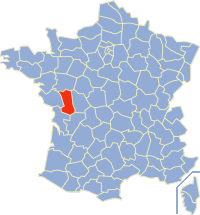

The following is a list of the 252 communes of the Deux-Sèvres department of France.

The communes cooperate in the following intercommunalities (as of 2025):

- Communauté d'agglomération du Bocage Bressuirais
- Communauté d'agglomération du Niortais
- Communauté de communes Airvaudais-Val du Thouet
- Communauté de communes Haut Val de Sèvre
- Communauté de communes Mellois en Poitou
- Communauté de communes de Parthenay-Gâtine
- Communauté de communes du Thouarsais
- Communauté de communes Val-de-Gâtine

| INSEE | Postal | Commune |
|---|---|---|
| 79001 | 79240 | L'Absie |
| 79002 | 79200 | Adilly |
| 79003 | 79230 | Aiffres |
| 79185 | 79370 | Aigondigné |
| 79005 | 79600 | Airvault |
| 79136 | 79110 | Alloinay |
| 79007 | 79130 | Allonne |
| 79008 | 79350 | Amailloux |
| 79009 | 79210 | Amuré |
| 79010 | 79210 | Arçais |
| 79012 | 79160 | Ardin |
| 79013 | 79150 | Argentonnay |
| 79015 | 79170 | Asnières-en-Poitou |
| 79016 | 79600 | Assais-les-Jumeaux |
| 79018 | 79110 | Aubigné |
| 79019 | 79390 | Aubigny |
| 79020 | 79400 | Augé |
| 79022 | 79600 | Availles-Thouarsais |
| 79023 | 79800 | Avon |
| 79024 | 79400 | Azay-le-Brûlé |
| 79025 | 79130 | Azay-sur-Thouet |
| 79029 | 79420 | Beaulieu-sous-Parthenay |
| 79030 | 79370 | Beaussais-Vitré |
| 79031 | 79360 | Beauvoir-sur-Niort |
| 79032 | 79160 | Béceleuf |
| 79034 | 79000 | Bessines |
| 79077 | 79160 | Beugnon-Thireuil |
| 79038 | 79300 | Boismé |
| 79040 | 79310 | La Boissière-en-Gâtine |
| 79042 | 79800 | Bougon |
| 79046 | 79210 | Le Bourdet |
| 79047 | 79600 | Boussais |
| 79049 | 79300 | Bressuire |
| 79050 | 79140 | Bretignolles |
| 79055 | 79170 | Brieuil-sur-Chizé |
| 79056 | 79290 | Brion-près-Thouet |
| 79057 | 79170 | Brioux-sur-Boutonne |
| 79058 | 79230 | Brûlain |
| 79059 | 79240 | Le Busseau |
| 79061 | 79370 | Celles-sur-Belle |
| 79062 | 79140 | Cerizay |
| 79066 | 79220 | Champdeniers |
| 79069 | 79320 | Chanteloup |
| 79070 | 79220 | La Chapelle-Bâton |
| 79071 | 79200 | La Chapelle-Bertrand |
| 79074 | 79190 | La Chapelle-Pouilloux |
| 79076 | 79430 | La Chapelle-Saint-Laurent |
| 79105 | 79340 | Les Châteliers |
| 79080 | 79200 | Châtillon-sur-Thouet |
| 79081 | 79180 | Chauray |
| 79083 | 79110 | Chef-Boutonne |
| 79084 | 79120 | Chenay |
| 79085 | 79170 | Chérigné |
| 79086 | 79410 | Cherveux |
| 79087 | 79120 | Chey |
| 79088 | 79350 | Chiché |
| 79089 | 79600 | Le Chillou |
| 79090 | 79170 | Chizé |
| 79091 | 79140 | Cirières |
| 79092 | 79420 | Clavé |
| 79094 | 79350 | Clessé |
| 79095 | 79190 | Clussais-la-Pommeraie |
| 79096 | 79140 | Combrand |
| 79100 | 79510 | Coulon |
| 79101 | 79160 | Coulonges-sur-l'Autize |
| 79102 | 79330 | Coulonges-Thouarsais |
| 79103 | 79440 | Courlay |
| 79104 | 79220 | Cours |
| 79106 | 79110 | Couture-d'Argenson |
| 79048 | 79260 | La Crèche |
| 79108 | 79390 | Doux |
| 79109 | 79410 | Échiré |
| 79111 | 79170 | Ensigné |
| 79112 | 79270 | Épannes |
| 79114 | 79400 | Exireuil |
| 79115 | 79800 | Exoudun |
| 79116 | 79350 | Faye-l'Abbesse |
| 79117 | 79160 | Faye-sur-Ardin |
| 79118 | 79450 | Fénery |
| 79119 | 79160 | Fenioux |
| 79120 | 79390 | La Ferrière-en-Parthenay |
| 79121 | 79340 | Fomperron |
| 79122 | 79110 | Fontenille-Saint-Martin-d'Entraigues |
| 79064 | 79500 | Fontivillié |
| 79123 | 79380 | La Forêt-sur-Sèvre |
| 79124 | 79340 | Les Forges |
| 79125 | 79230 | Fors |
| 79126 | 79360 | Les Fosses |
| 79127 | 79360 | La Foye-Monjault |
| 79128 | 79260 | François |
| 79129 | 79370 | Fressines |
| 79130 | 79270 | Frontenay-Rohan-Rohan |
| 79131 | 79330 | Geay |
| 79132 | 79150 | Genneton |
| 79133 | 79220 | Germond-Rouvre |
| 79134 | 79330 | Glénay |
| 79135 | 79200 | Gourgé |
| 79137 | 79360 | Granzay-Gript |
| 79139 | 79220 | Les Groseillers |
| 79141 | 79600 | Irais |
| 79142 | 79170 | Juillé |
| 79144 | 79230 | Juscorps |
| 79145 | 79200 | Lageon |
| 79147 | 79240 | Largeasse |
| 79148 | 79120 | Lezay |
| 79149 | 79390 | Lhoumois |
| 79150 | 79190 | Limalonges |
| 79014 | 79290 | Loretz-d'Argenton |
| 79152 | 79190 | Lorigné |
| 79153 | 79110 | Loubigné |
| 79154 | 79110 | Loubillé |
| 79156 | 79600 | Louin |
| 79157 | 79100 | Louzy |
| 79158 | 79170 | Luché-sur-Brioux |
| 79159 | 79330 | Luché-Thouarsais |
| 79160 | 79170 | Lusseray |
| 79161 | 79100 | Luzay |
| 79162 | 79460 | Magné |
| 79163 | 79190 | Mairé-Levescault |
| 79164 | 79500 | Maisonnay |
| 79165 | 79600 | Maisontiers |
| 79251 | 79500 | Marcillé |
| 79166 | 79360 | Marigny |
| 79167 | 79600 | Marnes |
| 79079 | 79700 | Mauléon |
| 79170 | 79210 | Mauzé-sur-le-Mignon |
| 79172 | 79310 | Mazières-en-Gâtine |
| 79174 | 79500 | Melle |
| 79175 | 79190 | Melleran |

| INSEE | Postal | Commune |
|---|---|---|
| 79176 | 79340 | Ménigoute |
| 79177 | 79120 | Messé |
| 79179 | 79320 | Moncoutant-sur-Sèvre |
| 79183 | 79140 | Montravers |
| 79184 | 79800 | La Mothe-Saint-Héray |
| 79189 | 79400 | Nanteuil |
| 79190 | 79130 | Neuvy-Bouin |
| 79191 | 79000 | Niort |
| 79195 | 79250 | Nueil-les-Aubiers |
| 79197 | 79390 | Oroux |
| 79198 | 79170 | Paizay-le-Chapt |
| 79200 | 79220 | Pamplie |
| 79201 | 79800 | Pamproux |
| 79202 | 79200 | Parthenay |
| 79203 | 79100 | Pas-de-Jeu |
| 79204 | 79170 | Périgné |
| 79207 | 79700 | La Petite-Boissière |
| 79208 | 79200 | La Peyratte |
| 79209 | 79330 | Pierrefitte |
| 79210 | 79140 | Le Pin |
| 79078 | 79360 | Plaine-d'Argenson |
| 79196 | 79100 | Plaine-et-Vallées |
| 79213 | 79200 | Pompaire |
| 79215 | 79130 | Pougne-Hérisson |
| 79216 | 79230 | Prahecq |
| 79217 | 79370 | Prailles-La Couarde |
| 79218 | 79390 | Pressigny |
| 79220 | 79210 | Prin-Deyrançon |
| 79223 | 79160 | Puihardy |
| 79225 | 79420 | Reffannes |
| 79226 | 79130 | Le Retail |
| 79229 | 79270 | La Rochénard |
| 79230 | 79120 | Rom |
| 79231 | 79260 | Romans |
| 79235 | 79700 | Saint-Amand-sur-Sèvre |
| 79236 | 79380 | Saint-André-sur-Sèvre |
| 79238 | 79300 | Saint-Aubin-du-Plain |
| 79239 | 79450 | Saint-Aubin-le-Cloud |
| 79241 | 79220 | Saint-Christophe-sur-Roc |
| 79243 | 79120 | Saint-Coutant |
| 79244 | 79100 | Saint-Cyr-la-Lande |
| 79246 | 79800 | Sainte-Eanne |
| 79250 | 79330 | Sainte-Gemme |
| 79283 | 79260 | Sainte-Néomaye |
| 79284 | 79220 | Sainte-Ouenne |
| 79297 | 79120 | Sainte-Soline |
| 79300 | 79100 | Sainte-Verge |
| 79249 | 79410 | Saint-Gelais |
| 79252 | 79600 | Saint-Généroux |
| 79253 | 79400 | Saint-Georges-de-Noisné |
| 79254 | 79210 | Saint-Georges-de-Rex |
| 79255 | 79200 | Saint-Germain-de-Longue-Chaume |
| 79256 | 79340 | Saint-Germier |
| 79257 | 79210 | Saint-Hilaire-la-Palud |
| 79258 | 79100 | Saint-Jacques-de-Thouars |
| 79259 | 79100 | Saint-Jean-de-Thouars |
| 79263 | 79160 | Saint-Laurs |
| 79265 | 79100 | Saint-Léger-de-Montbrun |
| 79267 | 79420 | Saint-Lin |
| 79268 | 79600 | Saint-Loup-Lamairé |
| 79269 | 79160 | Saint-Maixent-de-Beugné |
| 79270 | 79400 | Saint-Maixent-l'École |
| 79271 | 79310 | Saint-Marc-la-Lande |
| 79273 | 79230 | Saint-Martin-de-Bernegoue |
| 79274 | 79100 | Saint-Martin-de-Mâcon |
| 79276 | 79400 | Saint-Martin-de-Saint-Maixent |
| 79277 | 79290 | Saint-Martin-de-Sanzay |
| 79278 | 79420 | Saint-Martin-du-Fouilloux |
| 79280 | 79150 | Saint-Maurice-Étusson |
| 79281 | 79410 | Saint-Maxire |
| 79285 | 79310 | Saint-Pardoux-Soutiers |
| 79286 | 79240 | Saint-Paul-en-Gâtine |
| 79289 | 79700 | Saint-Pierre-des-Échaubrognes |
| 79290 | 79160 | Saint-Pompain |
| 79293 | 79410 | Saint-Rémy |
| 79294 | 79230 | Saint-Romans-des-Champs |
| 79295 | 79500 | Saint-Romans-lès-Melle |
| 79298 | 79270 | Saint-Symphorien |
| 79299 | 79330 | Saint-Varent |
| 79301 | 79500 | Saint-Vincent-la-Châtre |
| 79302 | 79400 | Saivres |
| 79303 | 79800 | Salles |
| 79304 | 79270 | Sansais |
| 79306 | 79200 | Saurais |
| 79307 | 79190 | Sauzé-entre-Bois |
| 79308 | 79000 | Sciecq |
| 79309 | 79240 | Scillé |
| 79310 | 79170 | Secondigné-sur-Belle |
| 79311 | 79130 | Secondigny |
| 79312 | 79170 | Séligné |
| 79313 | 79120 | Sepvret |
| 79316 | 79800 | Soudan |
| 79319 | 79800 | Souvigné |
| 79320 | 79220 | Surin |
| 79322 | 79200 | Le Tallud |
| 79326 | 79390 | Thénezay |
| 79329 | 79100 | Thouars |
| 79331 | 79100 | Tourtenay |
| 79332 | 79240 | Trayes |
| 79140 | 79110 | Valdelaume |
| 79334 | 79210 | Val-du-Mignon |
| 79063 | 79290 | Val en Vignes |
| 79335 | 79270 | Vallans |
| 79336 | 79120 | Vançais |
| 79337 | 79270 | Le Vanneau-Irleau |
| 79338 | 79120 | Vanzay |
| 79339 | 79340 | Vasles |
| 79340 | 79420 | Vausseroux |
| 79341 | 79420 | Vautebis |
| 79342 | 79240 | Vernoux-en-Gâtine |
| 79343 | 79170 | Vernoux-sur-Boutonne |
| 79345 | 79310 | Verruyes |
| 79346 | 79170 | Le Vert |
| 79347 | 79200 | Viennay |
| 79348 | 79170 | Villefollet |
| 79349 | 79110 | Villemain |
| 79350 | 79360 | Villiers-en-Bois |
| 79351 | 79160 | Villiers-en-Plaine |
| 79352 | 79170 | Villiers-sur-Chizé |
| 79354 | 79310 | Vouhé |
| 79355 | 79230 | Vouillé |
| 79242 | 79150 | Voulmentin |
| 79357 | 79220 | Xaintray |
