= Adilly =

- Commune
- Location of Adilly
- Location within France Location within Nouvelle-Aquitaine
- Coordinates: 46°41′27″N 0°18′41″W
- Country: France
- Region: Nouvelle-Aquitaine
- Department: Deux-Sèvres
- Arrondissement: Parthenay
- Canton: Parthenay
- Intercommunality: Parthenay-Gâtine

Government
  - Mayor (2020–2026): Ludovic Hérault
- Area^{1}: 13 km^{2} (5.0 sq mi)
- Population (2023): 310
  - Density: 24/km^{2} (62/sq mi)
- Time zone: UTC+01:00 (CET)
  - Summer (DST): UTC+02:00 (CEST)
- INSEE/Postal code: 79002 /79200
- ^{1} French Land Register data, which excludes lakes, ponds, glaciers > 1 km^{2} (0.386 sq mi or 247 acres) and river estuaries.

Adilly is a commune in the Deux-Sèvres department in the Nouvelle-Aquitaine region in western France. It is situated about 8 km (5.0 mi) northwest of the town of Parthenay.

The commune of Adilly has joined together with 37 neighbouring communes to establish the Communauté de communes de Parthenay-Gâtine which provides a framework within which local tasks are carried out together.

== Population ==
Historical population
Year	Pop.	±% p.a.
1968	342	—
1975	277	−2.97%
1982	292	+0.76%
1990	296	+0.17%
1999	284	−0.46%
2007	316	+1.34%
2012	304	−0.77%
2017	305	+0.07%
2023	310	+0.27%
Source: INSEE

== See also ==
- Communes of the Deux-Sèvres department
