= Pompaire =

- Commune
- Location of Pompaire
- Location within France Location within Nouvelle-Aquitaine
- Coordinates: 46°36′30″N 0°14′02″W
- Country: France
- Region: Nouvelle-Aquitaine
- Department: Deux-Sèvres
- Arrondissement: Parthenay
- Canton: Parthenay
- Intercommunality: CC Parthenay-Gâtine

Government
  - Mayor (2020–2026): Jean-Paul Chaussoneaux
- Area^{1}: 13 km^{2} (5.0 sq mi)
- Highest elevation: 198 m (650 ft)
- Lowest elevation: 133 m (436 ft)
- Population (2023): 2,049
  - Density: 160/km^{2} (410/sq mi)
- Time zone: UTC+01:00 (CET)
  - Summer (DST): UTC+02:00 (CEST)
- INSEE/Postal code: 79213 /
- ^{1} French Land Register data, which excludes lakes, ponds, glaciers > 1 km^{2} (0.386 sq mi or 247 acres) and river estuaries.

Pompaire (French pronunciation: [pɔ̃pɛʁ]) is a village and commune in the Deux-Sèvres department of the Nouvelle-Aquitaine region in western France. It is situated some 4 km south of the town of Parthenay.

The commune of Pompaire has joined together with 37 neighbouring communes to establish the Communauté de communes de Parthenay-Gâtine which provides a framework within which local tasks are carried out together.

== Population ==
Historical population
Year	Pop.	±% p.a.
1968	665	—
1975	1,167	+8.37%
1982	1,659	+5.15%
1990	1,828	+1.22%
1999	1,812	−0.10%
2007	1,913	+0.68%
2012	1,979	+0.68%
2017	2,001	+0.22%
2023	2,049	+0.40%
Source: INSEE

== See also ==
- Communes of the Deux-Sèvres department
