= Le Busseau =

- Commune
- Coat of arms
- Location of Le Busseau
- Location within France Location within Nouvelle-Aquitaine
- Coordinates: 46°34′49″N 0°35′39″W
- Country: France
- Region: Nouvelle-Aquitaine
- Department: Deux-Sèvres
- Arrondissement: Parthenay
- Canton: Autize-Égray

Government
  - Mayor (2020–2026): Philippe Dedoyard
- Area^{1}: 27.65 km^{2} (10.68 sq mi)
- Elevation: 110 m (360 ft)
- Highest elevation: 245 m (804 ft)
- Lowest elevation: 77 m (253 ft)
- Population (2023): 734
  - Density: 26.5/km^{2} (68.8/sq mi)
- Time zone: UTC+01:00 (CET)
  - Summer (DST): UTC+02:00 (CEST)
- INSEE/Postal code: 79059 /79240
- ^{1} French Land Register data, which excludes lakes, ponds, glaciers > 1 km^{2} (0.386 sq mi or 247 acres) and river estuaries.

Le Busseau (French pronunciation: [lə byso]) is a commune in the Deux-Sèvres department in the Nouvelle-Aquitaine region in western France.

== See also ==
- Communes of the Deux-Sèvres department
