= Arrondissement of Parthenay =

Coordinates: 46.65°N 0.25°W

Parthenay
- Arrondissement
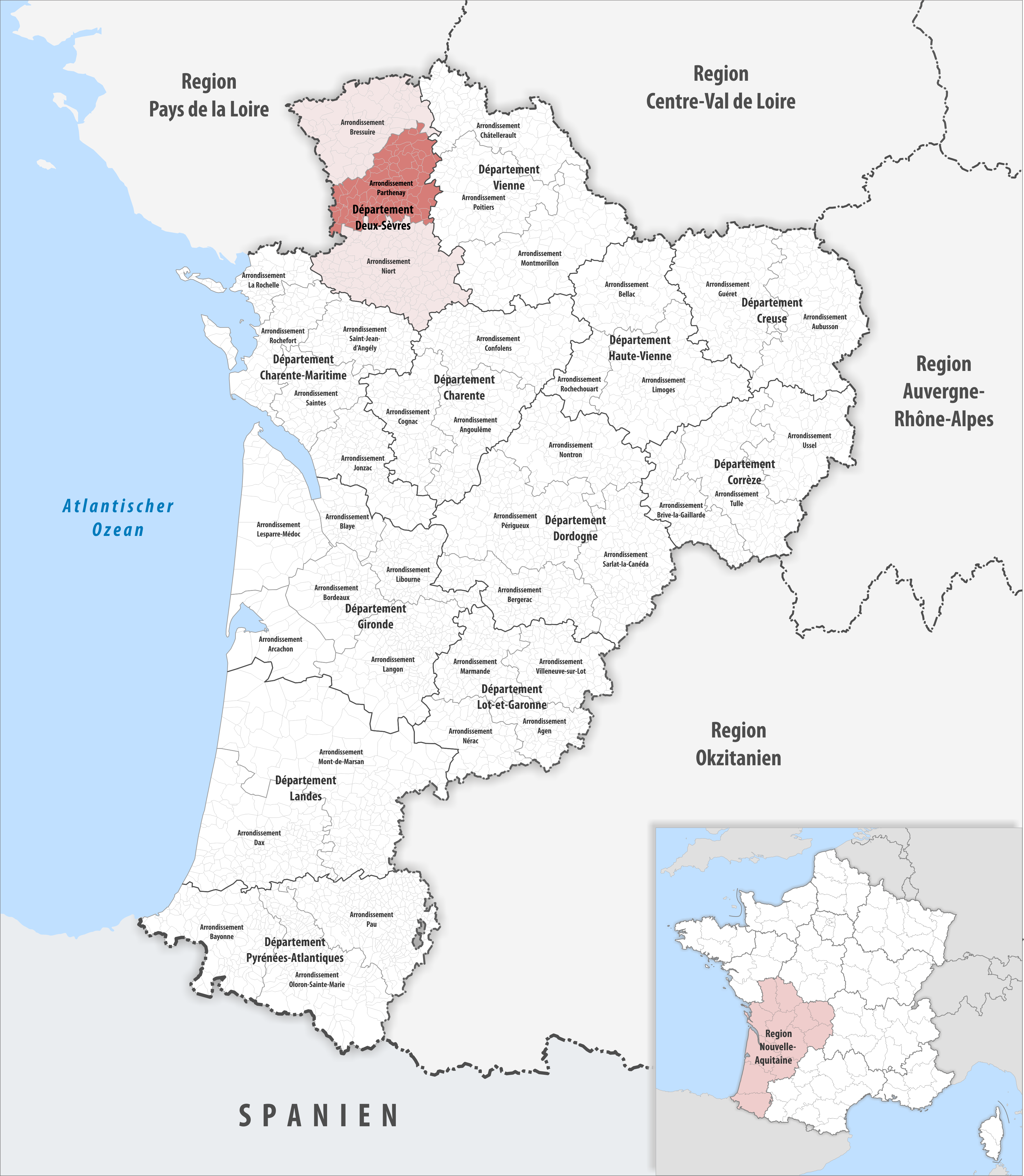
- Location within the region Nouvelle-Aquitaine
- Country: France
- Region: Nouvelle-Aquitaine
- Department: Deux-Sèvres
- No. of communes: {{{nbcomm}}}
- Area: 1,615.4 km^{2} (623.7 sq mi)
- Population (2023): 65,359
  - Density: 40.460/km^{2} (104.79/sq mi)
- INSEE code: 793

The arrondissement of Parthenay is an arrondissement of France in the Deux-Sèvres department in the Nouvelle-Aquitaine region. It has 78 communes. Its population is 65,401 (2021), and its area is 1,615.4 km^{2} (623.7 sq mi).

== Composition ==
The communes of the arrondissement of Parthenay, and their INSEE codes, are:

1. Adilly (79002)
2. Airvault (79005)
3. Allonne (79007)
4. Amailloux (79008)
5. Ardin (79012)
6. Assais-les-Jumeaux (79016)
7. Aubigny (79019)
8. Availles-Thouarsais (79022)
9. Azay-sur-Thouet (79025)
10. Beaulieu-sous-Parthenay (79029)
11. Béceleuf (79032)
12. Beugnon-Thireuil (79077)
13. La Boissière-en-Gâtine (79040)
14. Boussais (79047)
15. Le Busseau (79059)
16. Champdeniers (79066)
17. La Chapelle-Bâton (79070)
18. La Chapelle-Bertrand (79071)
19. Les Châteliers (79105)
20. Châtillon-sur-Thouet (79080)
21. Le Chillou (79089)
22. Clavé (79092)
23. Coulonges-sur-l'Autize (79101)
24. Cours (79104)
25. Doux (79108)
26. Faye-sur-Ardin (79117)
27. Fénery (79118)
28. Fenioux (79119)
29. La Ferrière-en-Parthenay (79120)
30. Fomperron (79121)
31. Les Forges (79124)
32. Gourgé (79135)
33. Les Groseillers (79139)
34. Irais (79141)
35. Lageon (79145)
36. Lhoumois (79149)
37. Louin (79156)
38. Maisontiers (79165)
39. Mazières-en-Gâtine (79172)
40. Ménigoute (79176)
41. Oroux (79197)
42. Pamplie (79200)
43. Parthenay (79202)
44. La Peyratte (79208)
45. Pompaire (79213)
46. Pougne-Hérisson (79215)
47. Pressigny (79218)
48. Puihardy (79223)
49. Reffannes (79225)
50. Le Retail (79226)
51. Saint-Aubin-le-Cloud (79239)
52. Saint-Christophe-sur-Roc (79241)
53. Sainte-Ouenne (79284)
54. Saint-Georges-de-Noisné (79253)
55. Saint-Germain-de-Longue-Chaume (79255)
56. Saint-Germier (79256)
57. Saint-Laurs (79263)
58. Saint-Lin (79267)
59. Saint-Loup-Lamairé (79268)
60. Saint-Maixent-de-Beugné (79269)
61. Saint-Marc-la-Lande (79271)
62. Saint-Martin-du-Fouilloux (79278)
63. Saint-Pardoux-Soutiers (79285)
64. Saint-Pompain (79290)
65. Saurais (79306)
66. Scillé (79309)
67. Secondigny (79311)
68. Surin (79320)
69. Le Tallud (79322)
70. Thénezay (79326)
71. Vasles (79339)
72. Vausseroux (79340)
73. Vautebis (79341)
74. Vernoux-en-Gâtine (79342)
75. Verruyes (79345)
76. Viennay (79347)
77. Vouhé (79354)
78. Xaintray (79357)

== History ==
The arrondissement of Parthenay was created in 1800. At the January 2018 reorganisation of the arrondissements of Deux-Sèvres, it received 21 communes from the arrondissement of Niort and lost 16 communes to the arrondissement of Bressuire.

As a result of the reorganisation of the cantons of France which came into effect in 2015, the borders of the cantons are no longer related to the borders of the arrondissements. The cantons of the arrondissement of Parthenay were, as of January 2015:

1. Airvault
2. Mazières-en-Gâtine
3. Ménigoute
4. Moncoutant
5. Parthenay
6. Saint-Loup-Lamairé
7. Secondigny
8. Thénezay
