= Le Chillou =

- Commune
- Location of Le Chillou
- Location within France Location within Nouvelle-Aquitaine
- Coordinates: 46°45′52″N 0°08′15″W
- Country: France
- Region: Nouvelle-Aquitaine
- Department: Deux-Sèvres
- Arrondissement: Parthenay
- Canton: Le Val de Thouet
- Intercommunality: Airvaudais-Val du Thouet

Government
  - Mayor (2020–2026): Françoise Richard
- Area^{1}: 5.12 km^{2} (1.98 sq mi)
- Elevation: 148 m (486 ft)
- Highest elevation: 157 m (515 ft)
- Lowest elevation: 87 m (285 ft)
- Population (2023): 163
  - Density: 31.8/km^{2} (82.5/sq mi)
- Time zone: UTC+01:00 (CET)
  - Summer (DST): UTC+02:00 (CEST)
- INSEE/Postal code: 79089 /79600
- ^{1} French Land Register data, which excludes lakes, ponds, glaciers > 1 km^{2} (0.386 sq mi or 247 acres) and river estuaries.

Le Chillou is a commune in the Deux-Sèvres department in the Nouvelle-Aquitaine region in western France.

== See also ==
- Communes of the Deux-Sèvres department
