= Verruyes =

- Commune
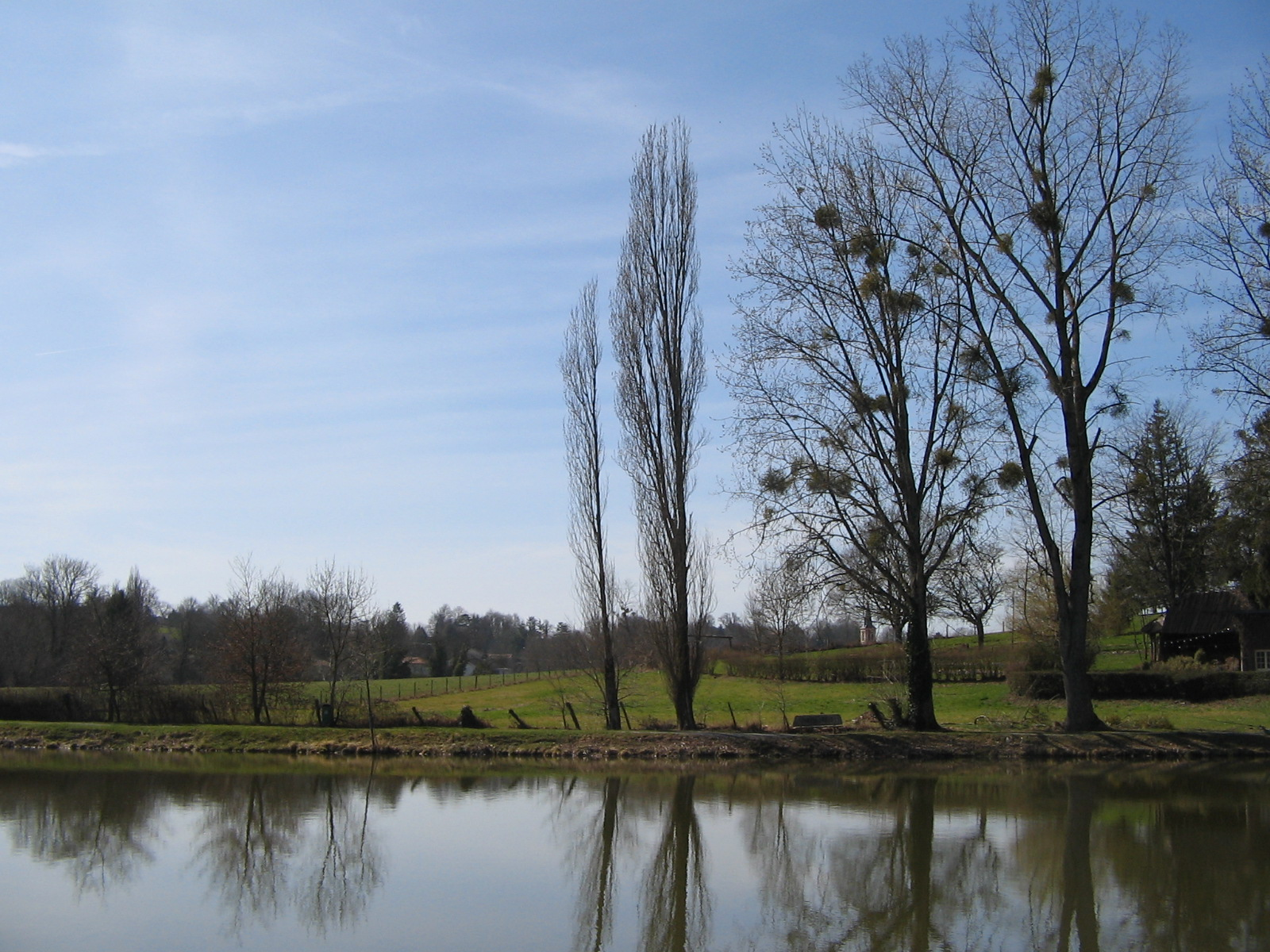
- The lake in Verruyes
- Location of Verruyes
- Location within France Location within Nouvelle-Aquitaine
- Coordinates: 46°31′01″N 0°17′18″W
- Country: France
- Region: Nouvelle-Aquitaine
- Department: Deux-Sèvres
- Arrondissement: Parthenay
- Canton: La Gâtine

Government
  - Mayor (2020–2026): Patrick Caillet
- Area^{1}: 26.24 km^{2} (10.13 sq mi)
- Elevation: 185 m (607 ft)
- Highest elevation: 224 m (735 ft)
- Lowest elevation: 115 m (377 ft)
- Population (2023): 900
  - Density: 34/km^{2} (89/sq mi)
- Time zone: UTC+01:00 (CET)
  - Summer (DST): UTC+02:00 (CEST)
- INSEE/Postal code: 79345 /79310
- ^{1} French Land Register data, which excludes lakes, ponds, glaciers > 1 km^{2} (0.386 sq mi or 247 acres) and river estuaries.

Verruyes (French pronunciation: [vɛʁɥi]) is a commune in the Deux-Sèvres department in western France.

== See also ==
- Communes of the Deux-Sèvres department
