= Lageon =

- Commune
- Location of Lageon
- Location within France Location within Nouvelle-Aquitaine
- Coordinates: 46°43′57″N 0°14′12″W
- Country: France
- Region: Nouvelle-Aquitaine
- Department: Deux-Sèvres
- Arrondissement: Parthenay
- Canton: Parthenay
- Intercommunality: CC Parthenay-Gâtine
- Area^{1}: 14 km^{2} (5.4 sq mi)
- Population (2023): 378
  - Density: 27/km^{2} (70/sq mi)
- Time zone: UTC+01:00 (CET)
  - Summer (DST): UTC+02:00 (CEST)
- INSEE/Postal code: 79145 /
- ^{1} French Land Register data, which excludes lakes, ponds, glaciers > 1 km^{2} (0.386 sq mi or 247 acres) and river estuaries.

Lageon (French pronunciation: [laʒɔ̃]) is a commune in the Deux-Sèvres department in south-western France.

== See also ==
- Communes of the Deux-Sèvres department
