= Pougne-Hérisson =

- Commune
- Location of Pougne-Hérisson
- Location within France Location within Nouvelle-Aquitaine
- Coordinates: 46°39′44″N 0°23′52″W
- Country: France
- Region: Nouvelle-Aquitaine
- Department: Deux-Sèvres
- Arrondissement: Parthenay
- Canton: La Gâtine
- Intercommunality: CC Parthenay-Gâtine

Government
  - Mayor (2020–2026): Guillaume Motard
- Area^{1}: 11.86 km^{2} (4.58 sq mi)
- Elevation: 220 m (720 ft)
- Highest elevation: 231 m (758 ft)
- Lowest elevation: 183 m (600 ft)
- Population (2023): 353
  - Density: 29.8/km^{2} (77.1/sq mi)
- Time zone: UTC+01:00 (CET)
  - Summer (DST): UTC+02:00 (CEST)
- INSEE/Postal code: 79215 /79130
- ^{1} French Land Register data, which excludes lakes, ponds, glaciers > 1 km^{2} (0.386 sq mi or 247 acres) and river estuaries.

Pougne-Hérisson (French pronunciation: [puɲ eʁisɔ̃]) is a commune in the Deux-Sèvres department in western France.

== See also ==
- Communes of the Deux-Sèvres department
