= Les Forges, Deux-Sèvres =

Les Forges
- Commune
- Location of Les Forges
- Location within France Location within Nouvelle-Aquitaine
- Coordinates: 46°32′28″N 0°01′50″W
- Country: France
- Region: Nouvelle-Aquitaine
- Department: Deux-Sèvres
- Arrondissement: Parthenay
- Canton: La Gâtine
- Intercommunality: CC Parthenay-Gâtine

Government
  - Mayor (2020–2026): Thierry Parnaudeau
- Area^{1}: 10.61 km^{2} (4.10 sq mi)
- Elevation: 196 m (643 ft)
- Highest elevation: 197 m (646 ft)
- Lowest elevation: 154 m (505 ft)
- Population (2023): 125
  - Density: 11.8/km^{2} (30.5/sq mi)
- Time zone: UTC+01:00 (CET)
  - Summer (DST): UTC+02:00 (CEST)
- INSEE/Postal code: 79124 /79340
- ^{1} French Land Register data, which excludes lakes, ponds, glaciers > 1 km^{2} (0.386 sq mi or 247 acres) and river estuaries.

Les Forges (French pronunciation: [le fɔʁʒ]) is a commune in the Deux-Sèvres department in the Nouvelle-Aquitaine region in western France.

== See also ==
- Communes of the Deux-Sèvres department
