= Saint-Laurs =

- Commune
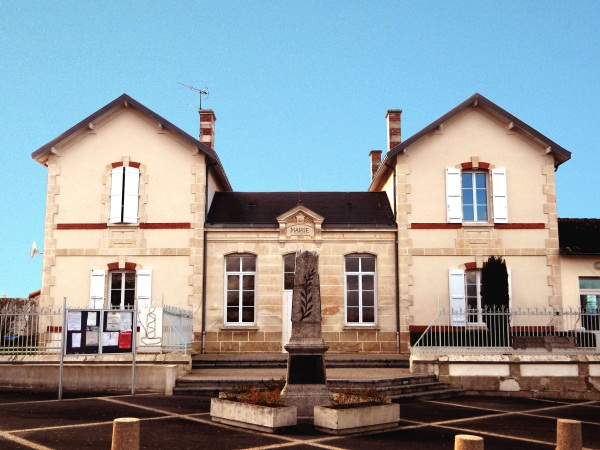
- Town hall
- Location of Saint-Laurs
- Location within France Location within Nouvelle-Aquitaine
- Coordinates: 46°31′21″N 0°34′26″W
- Country: France
- Region: Nouvelle-Aquitaine
- Department: Deux-Sèvres
- Arrondissement: Parthenay
- Canton: Autize-Égray

Government
  - Mayor (2020–2026): Gwénaël Debordes
- Area^{1}: 8.14 km^{2} (3.14 sq mi)
- Highest elevation: 139 m (456 ft)
- Lowest elevation: 69 m (226 ft)
- Population (2023): 615
  - Density: 75.6/km^{2} (196/sq mi)
- Time zone: UTC+01:00 (CET)
  - Summer (DST): UTC+02:00 (CEST)
- INSEE/Postal code: 79263 /79160
- ^{1} French Land Register data, which excludes lakes, ponds, glaciers > 1 km^{2} (0.386 sq mi or 247 acres) and river estuaries.

Saint-Laurs is a commune in the Deux-Sèvres department in western France.

== See also ==
- Communes of the Deux-Sèvres department
