= Vernoux-en-Gâtine =

- Commune
- Location of Vernoux-en-Gâtine
- Location within France Location within Nouvelle-Aquitaine
- Coordinates: 46°38′11″N 0°30′42″W
- Country: France
- Region: Nouvelle-Aquitaine
- Department: Deux-Sèvres
- Arrondissement: Parthenay
- Canton: La Gâtine
- Intercommunality: CC Parthenay-Gâtine

Government
  - Mayor (2020–2026): Véronique Sabiron
- Area^{1}: 31.20 km^{2} (12.05 sq mi)
- Elevation: 206 m (676 ft)
- Highest elevation: 241 m (791 ft)
- Lowest elevation: 115 m (377 ft)
- Population (2023): 592
  - Density: 19.0/km^{2} (49.1/sq mi)
- Time zone: UTC+01:00 (CET)
  - Summer (DST): UTC+02:00 (CEST)
- INSEE/Postal code: 79342 /79240
- ^{1} French Land Register data, which excludes lakes, ponds, glaciers > 1 km^{2} (0.386 sq mi or 247 acres) and river estuaries.

Vernoux-en-Gâtine (French pronunciation: [vɛʁnu ɑ̃ ɡatin]) is a commune in the Deux-Sèvres department in western France.

== See also ==
- Communes of the Deux-Sèvres department
