= Saint-Maixent-de-Beugné =

- Commune
- Location of Saint-Maixent-de-Beugné
- Location within France Location within Nouvelle-Aquitaine
- Coordinates: 46°30′20″N 0°36′28″W
- Country: France
- Region: Nouvelle-Aquitaine
- Department: Deux-Sèvres
- Arrondissement: Parthenay
- Canton: Autize-Égray

Government
  - Mayor (2020–2026): Myriam Tranchet
- Area^{1}: 11.02 km^{2} (4.25 sq mi)
- Elevation: 95 m (312 ft)
- Highest elevation: 122 m (400 ft)
- Lowest elevation: 54 m (177 ft)
- Population (2023): 416
  - Density: 37.7/km^{2} (97.8/sq mi)
- Time zone: UTC+01:00 (CET)
  - Summer (DST): UTC+02:00 (CEST)
- INSEE/Postal code: 79269 /79160
- ^{1} French Land Register data, which excludes lakes, ponds, glaciers > 1 km^{2} (0.386 sq mi or 247 acres) and river estuaries.

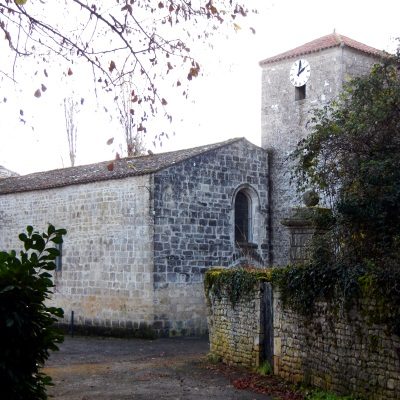
Saint-maixent-de-beugné-église

Saint-Maixent-de-Beugné (French pronunciation: [sɛ̃ mɛksɑ̃ də bœɲe]) is a commune in the Deux-Sèvres department in western France.

== See also ==
- Communes of the Deux-Sèvres department
