= Saint-Aubin-le-Cloud =

- Commune
- Location of Saint-Aubin-le-Cloud
- Location within France Location within Nouvelle-Aquitaine
- Coordinates: 46°39′09″N 0°21′09″W
- Country: France
- Region: Nouvelle-Aquitaine
- Department: Deux-Sèvres
- Arrondissement: Parthenay
- Canton: La Gâtine
- Intercommunality: CC Parthenay-Gâtine

Government
  - Mayor (2020–2026): Hervé-Loïc Boucher
- Area^{1}: 41.83 km^{2} (16.15 sq mi)
- Elevation: 180 m (590 ft)
- Highest elevation: 231 m (758 ft)
- Lowest elevation: 132 m (433 ft)
- Population (2023): 1,648
  - Density: 39.40/km^{2} (102.0/sq mi)
- Time zone: UTC+01:00 (CET)
  - Summer (DST): UTC+02:00 (CEST)
- INSEE/Postal code: 79239 /79450
- ^{1} French Land Register data, which excludes lakes, ponds, glaciers > 1 km^{2} (0.386 sq mi or 247 acres) and river estuaries.

Saint-Aubin-le-Cloud (French pronunciation: [sɛ̃.t‿obɛ̃ lə klu]) is a commune in the Deux-Sèvres department in western France.

== See also ==
- Communes of the Deux-Sèvres department
