= Sainte-Ouenne =

- Commune
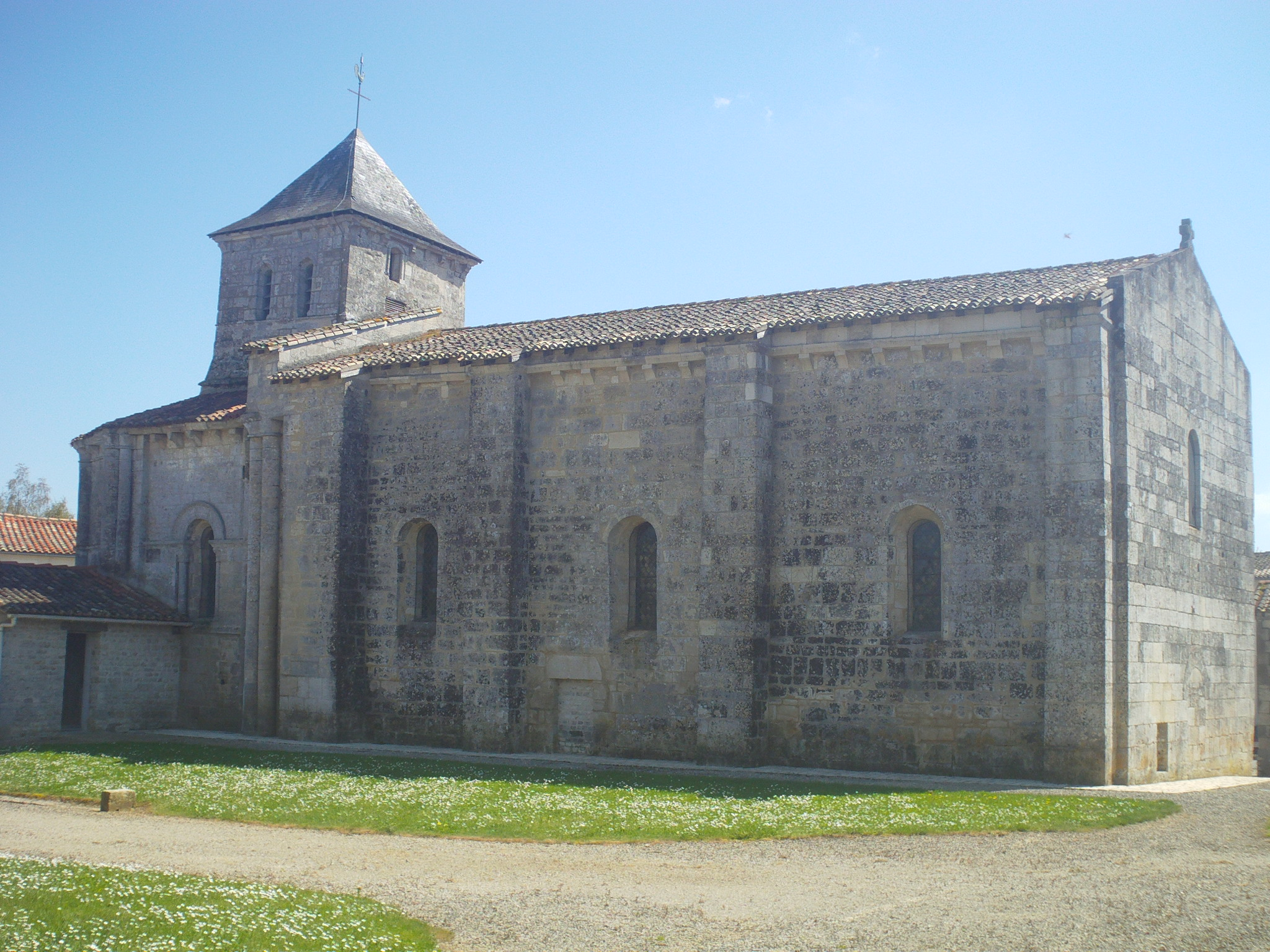
- The church in Sainte-Ouenne
- Location of Sainte-Ouenne
- Location within France Location within Nouvelle-Aquitaine
- Coordinates: 46°26′47″N 0°26′42″W
- Country: France
- Region: Nouvelle-Aquitaine
- Department: Deux-Sèvres
- Arrondissement: Parthenay
- Canton: Autize-Égray

Government
  - Mayor (2020–2026): Thierry Lemaître
- Area^{1}: 11.58 km^{2} (4.47 sq mi)
- Elevation: 90 m (300 ft)
- Highest elevation: 108 m (354 ft)
- Lowest elevation: 27 m (89 ft)
- Population (2023): 789
  - Density: 68.1/km^{2} (176/sq mi)
- Time zone: UTC+01:00 (CET)
  - Summer (DST): UTC+02:00 (CEST)
- INSEE/Postal code: 79284 /79220
- ^{1} French Land Register data, which excludes lakes, ponds, glaciers > 1 km^{2} (0.386 sq mi or 247 acres) and river estuaries.

Sainte-Ouenne (French pronunciation: [sɛ̃t wɛn]) is a commune in the Deux-Sèvres department in western France.

== See also ==
- Communes of the Deux-Sèvres department
