= Les Groseillers =

- Commune
- Location of Les Groseillers
- Location within France Location within Nouvelle-Aquitaine
- Coordinates: 46°31′34″N 0°24′06″W
- Country: France
- Region: Nouvelle-Aquitaine
- Department: Deux-Sèvres
- Arrondissement: Parthenay
- Canton: La Gâtine

Government
  - Mayor (2020–2026): Lydie Bernardeau
- Area^{1}: 4.46 km^{2} (1.72 sq mi)
- Elevation: 171 m (561 ft)
- Highest elevation: 178 m (584 ft)
- Lowest elevation: 99 m (325 ft)
- Population (2023): 54
  - Density: 12/km^{2} (31/sq mi)
- Time zone: UTC+01:00 (CET)
  - Summer (DST): UTC+02:00 (CEST)
- INSEE/Postal code: 79139 /79220
- ^{1} French Land Register data, which excludes lakes, ponds, glaciers > 1 km^{2} (0.386 sq mi or 247 acres) and river estuaries.

Les Groseillers (French pronunciation: [le ɡʁozɛje]) is a commune in the Deux-Sèvres department in western France.

== See also ==
- Communes of the Deux-Sèvres department
