= Saint-Germier, Deux-Sèvres =

Saint-Germier
- Commune
- Location of Saint-Germier
- Location within France Location within Nouvelle-Aquitaine
- Coordinates: 46°27′44″N 0°02′16″W
- Country: France
- Region: Nouvelle-Aquitaine
- Department: Deux-Sèvres
- Arrondissement: Parthenay
- Canton: La Gâtine
- Intercommunality: CC Parthenay-Gâtine

Government
  - Mayor (2020–2026): Jean-François Lhermitte
- Area^{1}: 11.78 km^{2} (4.55 sq mi)
- Elevation: 173 m (568 ft)
- Highest elevation: 183 m (600 ft)
- Lowest elevation: 134 m (440 ft)
- Population (2023): 261
  - Density: 22.2/km^{2} (57.4/sq mi)
- Time zone: UTC+01:00 (CET)
  - Summer (DST): UTC+02:00 (CEST)
- INSEE/Postal code: 79256 /79340
- ^{1} French Land Register data, which excludes lakes, ponds, glaciers > 1 km^{2} (0.386 sq mi or 247 acres) and river estuaries.

Saint-Germier (French pronunciation: [sɛ̃ ʒɛʁmje]) is a commune in the Deux-Sèvres department in western France.

== See also ==
- Communes of the Deux-Sèvres department
