= Saurais =

- Commune
- Location of Saurais
- Location within France Location within Nouvelle-Aquitaine
- Coordinates: 46°37′12″N 0°08′39″W
- Country: France
- Region: Nouvelle-Aquitaine
- Department: Deux-Sèvres
- Arrondissement: Parthenay
- Canton: La Gâtine
- Intercommunality: CC Parthenay-Gâtine

Government
  - Mayor (2020–2026): Louis-Marie Guérineau
- Area^{1}: 11.3 km^{2} (4.4 sq mi)
- Elevation: 232 m (761 ft)
- Highest elevation: 268 m (879 ft)
- Lowest elevation: 154 m (505 ft)
- Population (2023): 178
  - Density: 15.8/km^{2} (40.8/sq mi)
- Time zone: UTC+01:00 (CET)
  - Summer (DST): UTC+02:00 (CEST)
- INSEE/Postal code: 79306 /79200
- ^{1} French Land Register data, which excludes lakes, ponds, glaciers > 1 km^{2} (0.386 sq mi or 247 acres) and river estuaries.

Saurais (French pronunciation: [soʁɛ]) is a commune in the Deux-Sèvres department in western France.

== See also ==
- Communes of the Deux-Sèvres department
