= Vausseroux =

- Commune
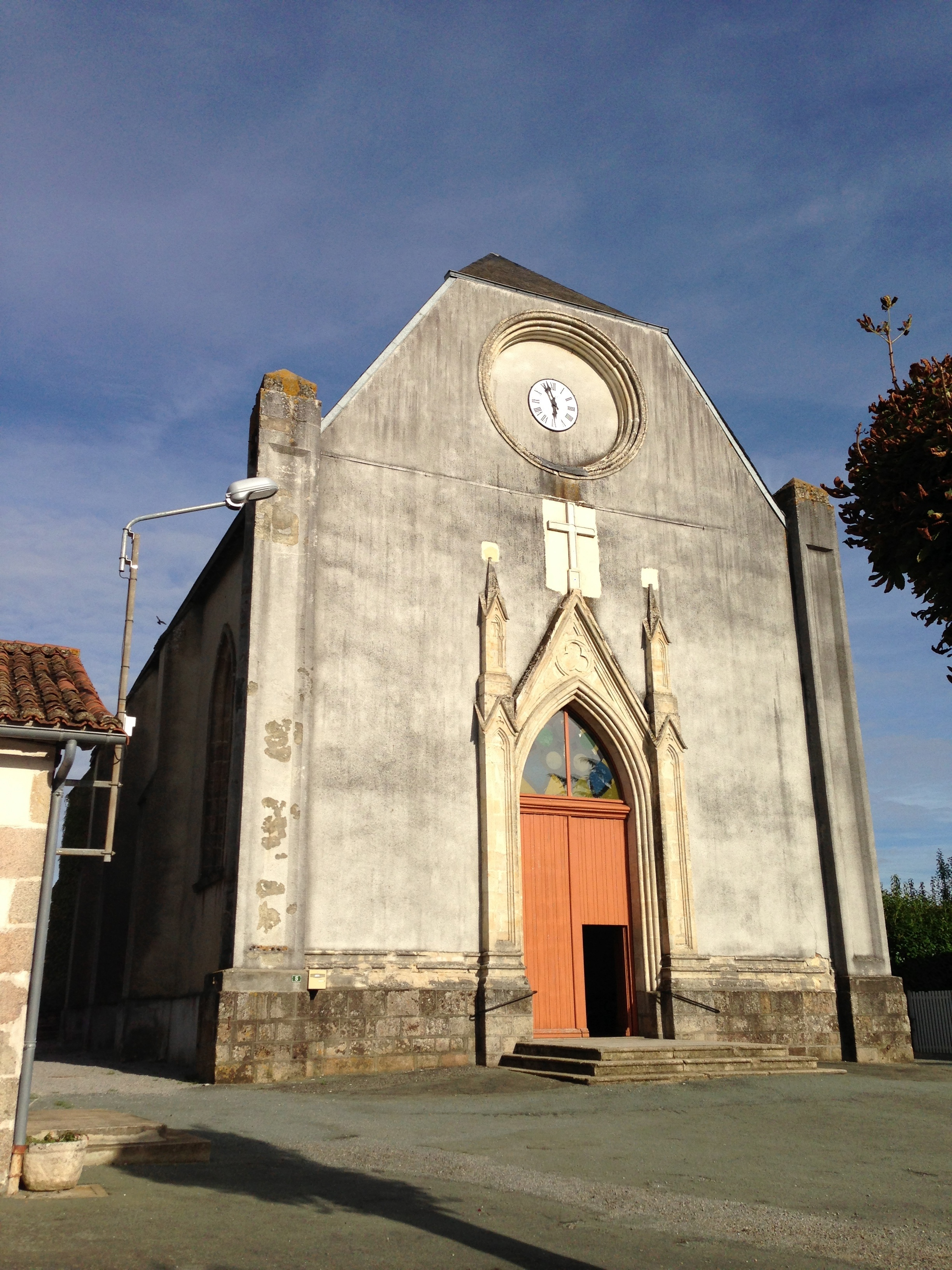
- The church of Sainte Radegonde
- Location of Vausseroux
- Location within France Location within Nouvelle-Aquitaine
- Coordinates: 46°33′07″N 0°08′06″W
- Country: France
- Region: Nouvelle-Aquitaine
- Department: Deux-Sèvres
- Arrondissement: Parthenay
- Canton: La Gâtine
- Intercommunality: CC Parthenay-Gâtine

Government
  - Mayor (2020–2026): Philippe Albert
- Area^{1}: 19.12 km^{2} (7.38 sq mi)
- Elevation: 180 m (590 ft)
- Highest elevation: 232 m (761 ft)
- Lowest elevation: 161 m (528 ft)
- Population (2023): 334
  - Density: 17.5/km^{2} (45.2/sq mi)
- Time zone: UTC+01:00 (CET)
  - Summer (DST): UTC+02:00 (CEST)
- INSEE/Postal code: 79340 /79420
- ^{1} French Land Register data, which excludes lakes, ponds, glaciers > 1 km^{2} (0.386 sq mi or 247 acres) and river estuaries.

Vausseroux (French pronunciation: [vosʁu]) is a commune in the Deux-Sèvres department in western France.

== See also ==
- Communes of the Deux-Sèvres department
