= Faye-sur-Ardin =

- Commune
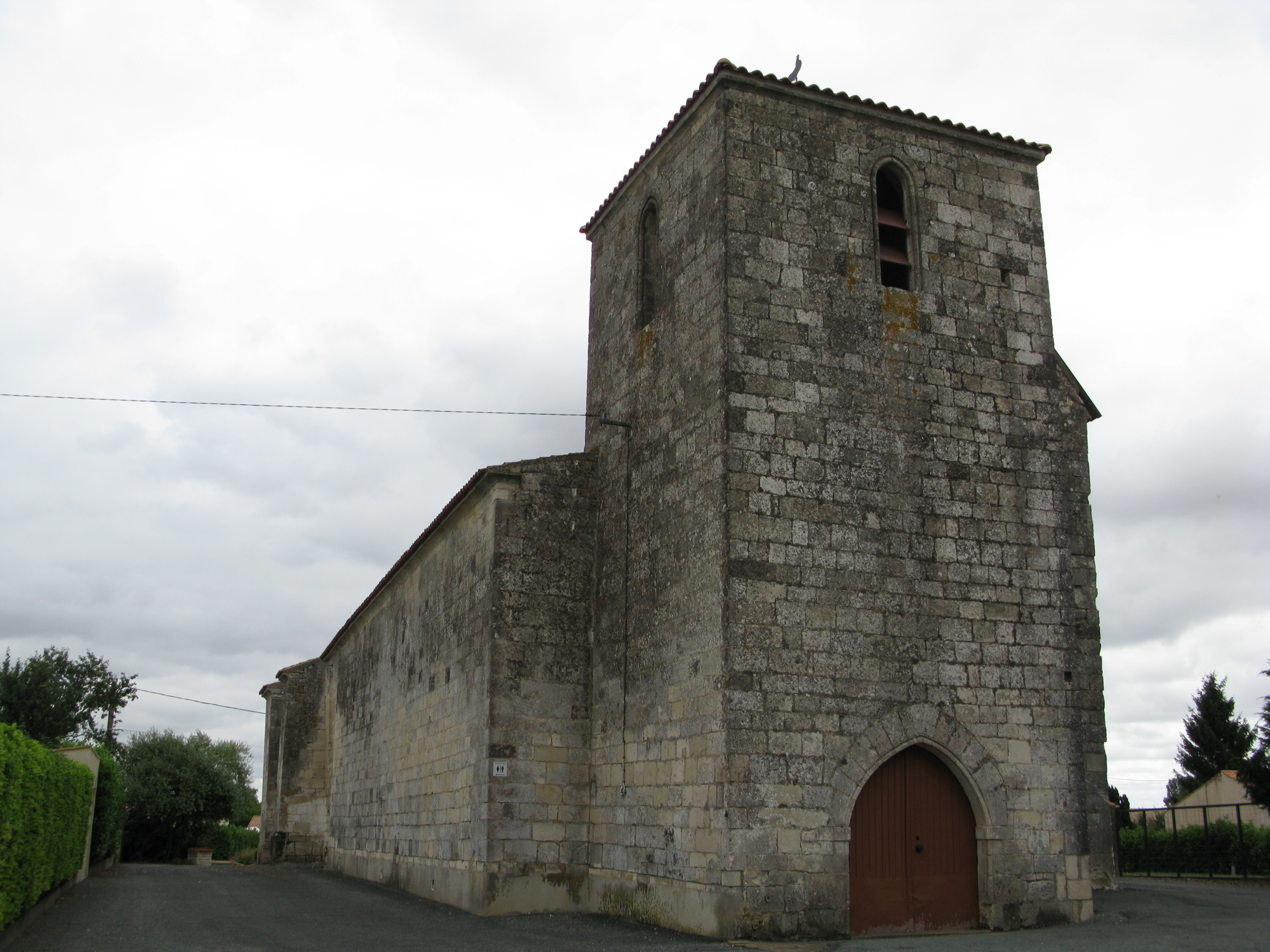
- The church in Faye-sur-Ardin
- Location of Faye-sur-Ardin
- Location within France Location within Nouvelle-Aquitaine
- Coordinates: 46°26′56″N 0°30′39″W
- Country: France
- Region: Nouvelle-Aquitaine
- Department: Deux-Sèvres
- Arrondissement: Parthenay
- Canton: Autize-Égray
- Intercommunality: Val-de-Gâtine

Government
  - Mayor (2020–2026): Corine Micou
- Area^{1}: 15.03 km^{2} (5.80 sq mi)
- Elevation: 60 m (200 ft)
- Highest elevation: 110 m (360 ft)
- Lowest elevation: 44 m (144 ft)
- Population (2023): 667
  - Density: 44.4/km^{2} (115/sq mi)
- Time zone: UTC+01:00 (CET)
  - Summer (DST): UTC+02:00 (CEST)
- INSEE/Postal code: 79117 /79160
- ^{1} French Land Register data, which excludes lakes, ponds, glaciers > 1 km^{2} (0.386 sq mi or 247 acres) and river estuaries.

Faye-sur-Ardin is a commune in the Deux-Sèvres department in the Nouvelle-Aquitaine region in western France.

== See also ==
- Communes of the Deux-Sèvres department
