= Viennay =

- Commune
- Location of Viennay
- Location within France Location within Nouvelle-Aquitaine
- Coordinates: 46°41′22″N 0°14′41″W
- Country: France
- Region: Nouvelle-Aquitaine
- Department: Deux-Sèvres
- Arrondissement: Parthenay
- Canton: Parthenay
- Intercommunality: CC Parthenay-Gâtine

Government
  - Mayor (2020–2026): Christophe Morin
- Area^{1}: 16 km^{2} (6.2 sq mi)
- Highest elevation: 178 m (584 ft)
- Lowest elevation: 125 m (410 ft)
- Population (2023): 1,062
  - Density: 66/km^{2} (170/sq mi)
- Time zone: UTC+01:00 (CET)
  - Summer (DST): UTC+02:00 (CEST)
- INSEE/Postal code: 79347 /
- ^{1} French Land Register data, which excludes lakes, ponds, glaciers > 1 km^{2} (0.386 sq mi or 247 acres) and river estuaries.

Viennay (French pronunciation: [vjɛnɛ]) is a commune in the Deux-Sèvres department in western France.

== See also ==
- Communes of the Deux-Sèvres department
