= Oroux =

- Commune
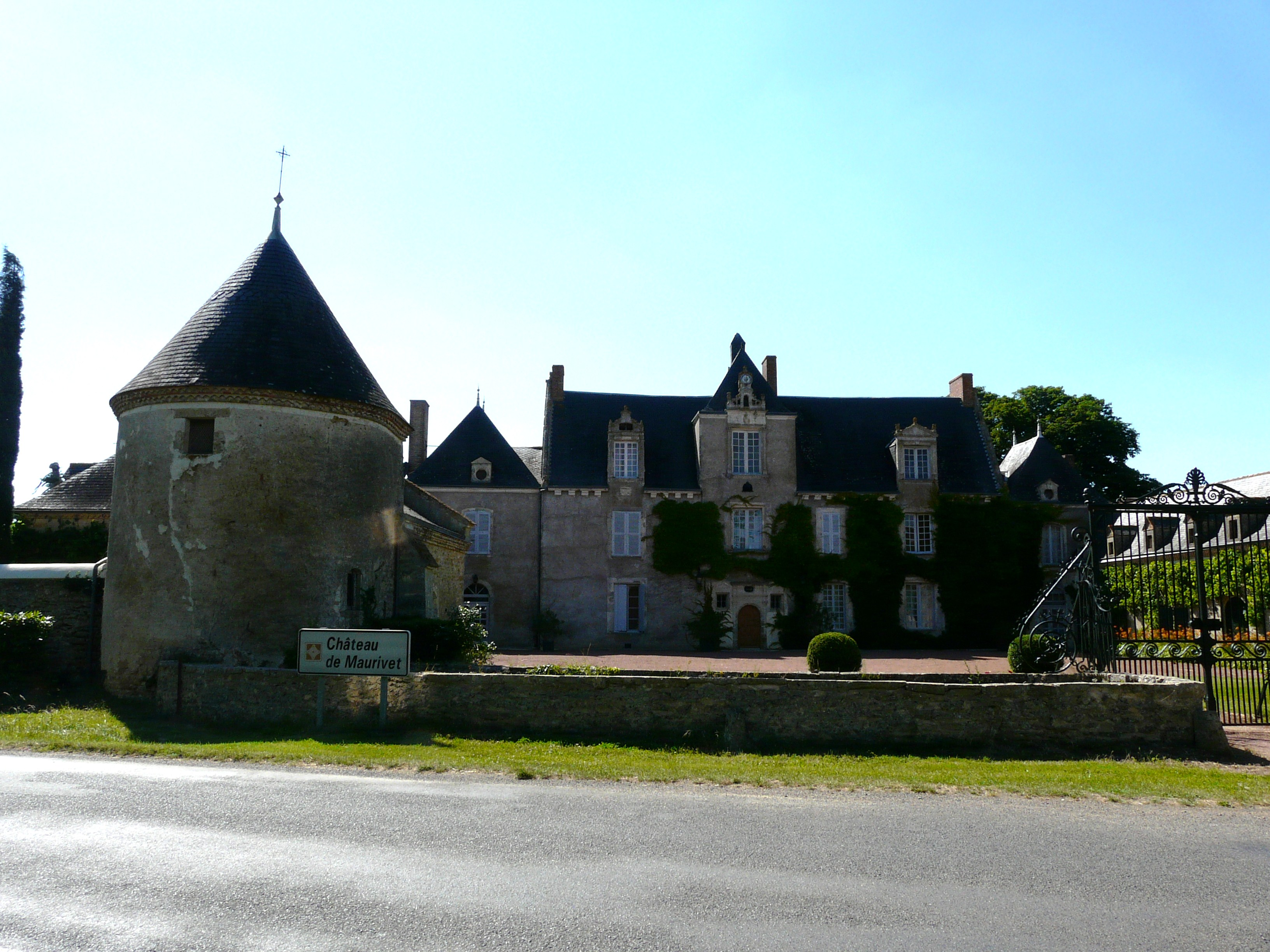
- Chateau of Maurivet
- Location of Oroux
- Location within France Location within Nouvelle-Aquitaine
- Coordinates: 46°41′34″N 0°05′18″W
- Country: France
- Region: Nouvelle-Aquitaine
- Department: Deux-Sèvres
- Arrondissement: Parthenay
- Canton: La Gâtine
- Intercommunality: CC Parthenay-Gâtine

Government
  - Mayor (2020–2026): Mickaël Chartier
- Area^{1}: 6.56 km^{2} (2.53 sq mi)
- Elevation: 160 m (520 ft)
- Highest elevation: 177 m (581 ft)
- Lowest elevation: 142 m (466 ft)
- Population (2023): 102
  - Density: 15.5/km^{2} (40.3/sq mi)
- Time zone: UTC+01:00 (CET)
  - Summer (DST): UTC+02:00 (CEST)
- INSEE/Postal code: 79197 /79390
- ^{1} French Land Register data, which excludes lakes, ponds, glaciers > 1 km^{2} (0.386 sq mi or 247 acres) and river estuaries.

Oroux (French pronunciation: [ɔʁu]) is a commune in the Deux-Sèvres department in western France.

== See also ==
- Communes of the Deux-Sèvres department
