= Reffannes =

- Commune
- Location of Reffannes
- Location within France Location within Nouvelle-Aquitaine
- Coordinates: 46°33′03″N 0°11′16″W
- Country: France
- Region: Nouvelle-Aquitaine
- Department: Deux-Sèvres
- Arrondissement: Parthenay
- Canton: La Gâtine
- Intercommunality: CC Parthenay-Gâtine

Government
  - Mayor (2020–2026): Michel Roy
- Area^{1}: 8.58 km^{2} (3.31 sq mi)
- Elevation: 235 m (771 ft)
- Highest elevation: 216 m (709 ft)
- Lowest elevation: 168 m (551 ft)
- Population (2023): 386
  - Density: 45.0/km^{2} (117/sq mi)
- Time zone: UTC+01:00 (CET)
  - Summer (DST): UTC+02:00 (CEST)
- INSEE/Postal code: 79225 /79420
- ^{1} French Land Register data, which excludes lakes, ponds, glaciers > 1 km^{2} (0.386 sq mi or 247 acres) and river estuaries.

Reffannes (French pronunciation: [ʁɛfan]) is a commune in the Deux-Sèvres department in western France.

== See also ==
- Communes of the Deux-Sèvres department
