= Canton of Parthenay =

Coordinates: 46°40′36″N 0°16′23″W

Parthenay
- Canton
- Interactive map of Parthenay
- Country: France
- Region: {{{region}}}
- Department: {{{department}}}
- No. of communes: {{{nbcomm}}}
- Area: 186 km^{2} (72 sq mi)
- Population (2023): 20,516
  - Density: 110/km^{2} (286/sq mi)
- INSEE code: {{{INSEE}}}

The canton of Parthenay is a canton located in the arrondissement of Parthenay, in the département of Deux-Sèvres, in the Nouvelle-Aquitaine région of France. The canton is made up of 11 undivided communes.

== Communes ==
The communes of the canton of Parthenay, and their INSEE codes, are:

1. Adilly (79002)
2. Amailloux (79008)
3. La Chapelle-Bertrand (79071)
4. Châtillon-sur-Thouet (79080)
5. Fénery (79118)
6. Lageon (79145)
7. Parthenay (79202; chef-lieu of the canton)
8. Pompaire (79213)
9. Saint-Germain-de-Longue-Chaume (79255)
10. Le Tallud (79322)
11. Viennay (79347)
