= Aubigny, Deux-Sèvres =

Aubigny
- Commune
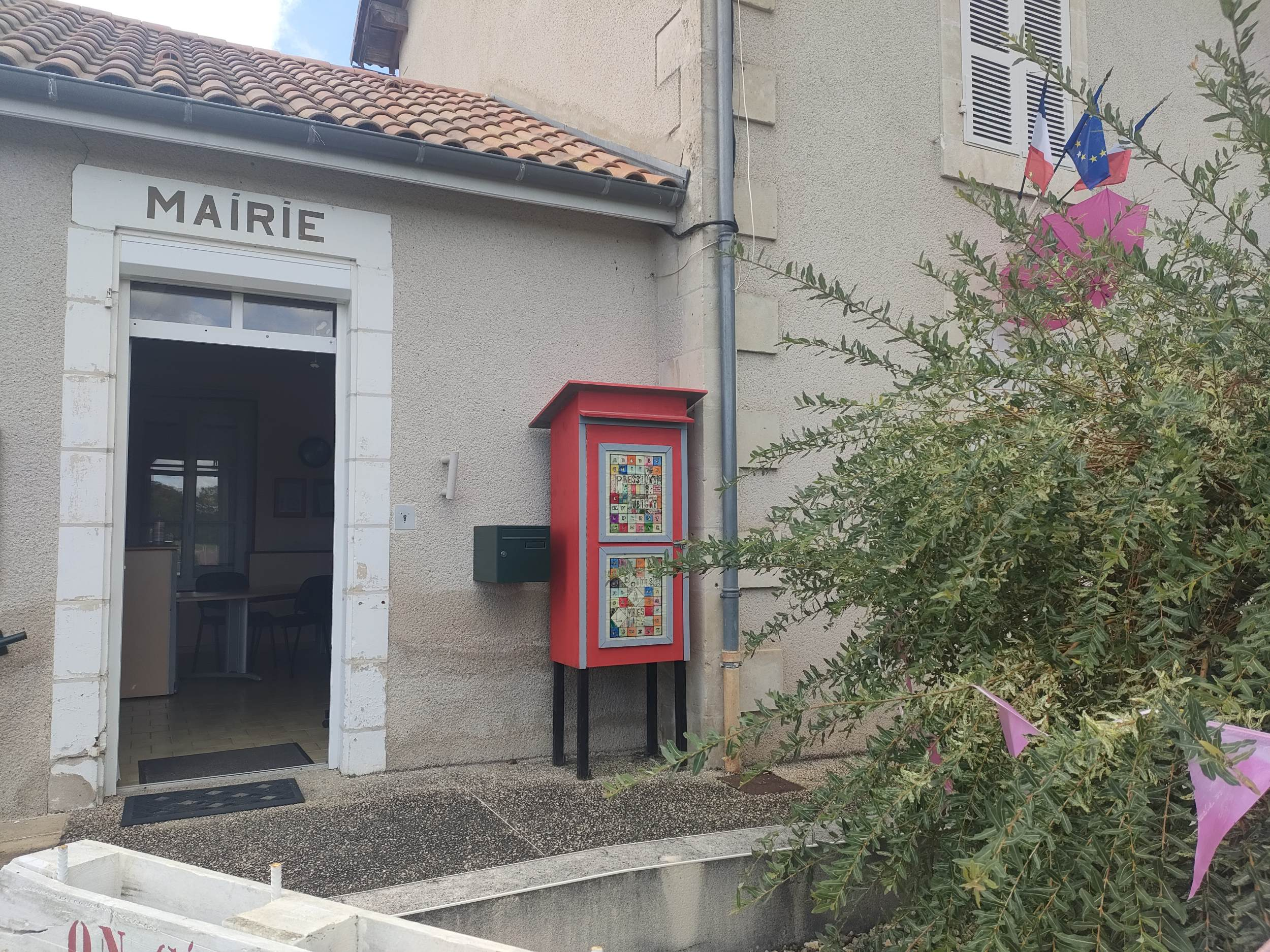
- Aubigny Town hall
- Location of Aubigny
- Location within France Location within Nouvelle-Aquitaine
- Coordinates: 46°44′29″N 0°07′06″W
- Country: France
- Region: Nouvelle-Aquitaine
- Department: Deux-Sèvres
- Arrondissement: Parthenay
- Canton: La Gâtine
- Intercommunality: CC Parthenay-Gâtine

Government
  - Mayor (2020–2026): Daniel Malvaud
- Area^{1}: 11.98 km^{2} (4.63 sq mi)
- Elevation: 156 m (512 ft)
- Highest elevation: 166 m (545 ft)
- Lowest elevation: 123 m (404 ft)
- Population (2023): 178
  - Density: 14.9/km^{2} (38.5/sq mi)
- Time zone: UTC+01:00 (CET)
  - Summer (DST): UTC+02:00 (CEST)
- INSEE/Postal code: 79019 /79390
- ^{1} French Land Register data, which excludes lakes, ponds, glaciers > 1 km^{2} (0.386 sq mi or 247 acres) and river estuaries.

Aubigny (French pronunciation: [obiɲi]) is a commune in the Deux-Sèvres department in the Nouvelle-Aquitaine region in western France.

== See also ==
- Communes of the Deux-Sèvres department
