= Fomperron =

- Commune
- Location of Fomperron
- Location within France Location within Nouvelle-Aquitaine
- Coordinates: 46°28′38″N 0°06′27″W
- Country: France
- Region: Nouvelle-Aquitaine
- Department: Deux-Sèvres
- Arrondissement: Parthenay
- Canton: La Gâtine
- Intercommunality: CC Parthenay-Gâtine

Government
  - Mayor (2020–2026): Bertrand Bonneau
- Area^{1}: 17.40 km^{2} (6.72 sq mi)
- Elevation: 180 m (590 ft)
- Highest elevation: 191 m (627 ft)
- Lowest elevation: 149 m (489 ft)
- Population (2023): 388
  - Density: 22.3/km^{2} (57.8/sq mi)
- Time zone: UTC+01:00 (CET)
  - Summer (DST): UTC+02:00 (CEST)
- INSEE/Postal code: 79121 /79340
- ^{1} French Land Register data, which excludes lakes, ponds, glaciers > 1 km^{2} (0.386 sq mi or 247 acres) and river estuaries.

Fomperron (French pronunciation: [fɔ̃pɛʁɔ̃]) is a commune in the Deux-Sèvres department in the Nouvelle-Aquitaine region in western France.

== See also ==
- Communes of the Deux-Sèvres department
