= Ménigoute =

- Commune
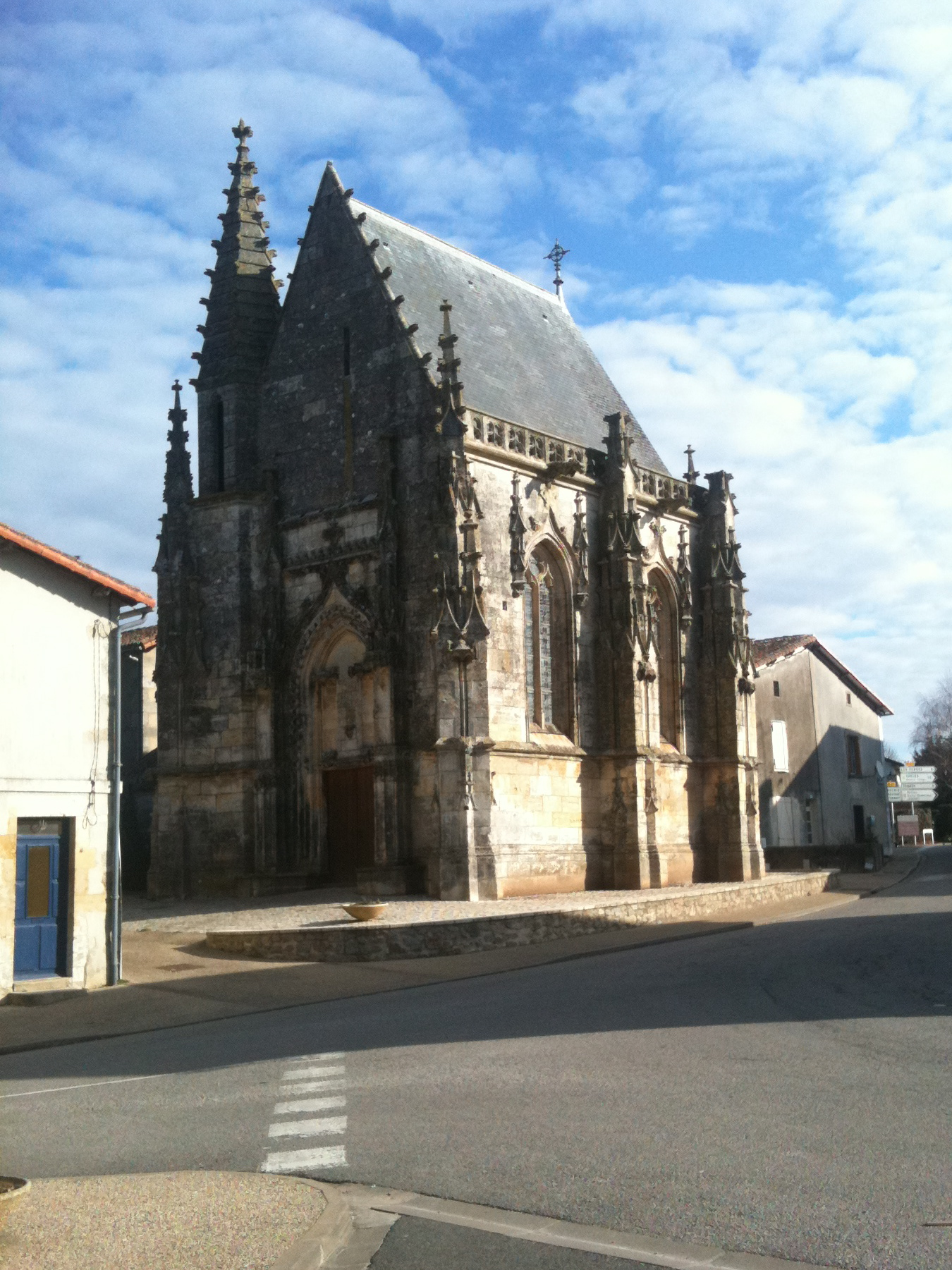
- The chapel in Ménigoute

- Coat of arms
- Location of Ménigoute
- Location within France Location within Nouvelle-Aquitaine
- Coordinates: 46°29′46″N 0°03′28″W
- Country: France
- Region: Nouvelle-Aquitaine
- Department: Deux-Sèvres
- Arrondissement: Parthenay
- Canton: La Gâtine
- Intercommunality: CC Parthenay-Gâtine

Government
  - Mayor (2020–2026): Didier Gaillard
- Area^{1}: 19.22 km^{2} (7.42 sq mi)
- Elevation: 163 m (535 ft)
- Highest elevation: 181 m (594 ft)
- Lowest elevation: 122 m (400 ft)
- Population (2023): 846
  - Density: 44.0/km^{2} (114/sq mi)
- Time zone: UTC+01:00 (CET)
  - Summer (DST): UTC+02:00 (CEST)
- INSEE/Postal code: 79176 /79340
- ^{1} French Land Register data, which excludes lakes, ponds, glaciers > 1 km^{2} (0.386 sq mi or 247 acres) and river estuaries.

Ménigoute (French pronunciation: [meniɡut]) is a commune in the Deux-Sèvres department in western France.It has a population of 892.

== See also ==
- Communes of the Deux-Sèvres department
