= Xaintray =

- Commune
- Location of Xaintray
- Location within France Location within Nouvelle-Aquitaine
- Coordinates: 46°29′37″N 0°28′39″W
- Country: France
- Region: Nouvelle-Aquitaine
- Department: Deux-Sèvres
- Arrondissement: Parthenay
- Canton: Autize-Égray
- Intercommunality: Val-de-Gâtine

Government
  - Mayor (2022–2026): Lionel Moreau
- Area^{1}: 11.15 km^{2} (4.31 sq mi)
- Elevation: 120 m (390 ft)
- Highest elevation: 127 m (417 ft)
- Lowest elevation: 50 m (160 ft)
- Population (2023): 238
  - Density: 21.3/km^{2} (55.3/sq mi)
- Time zone: UTC+01:00 (CET)
  - Summer (DST): UTC+02:00 (CEST)
- INSEE/Postal code: 79357 /79220
- ^{1} French Land Register data, which excludes lakes, ponds, glaciers > 1 km^{2} (0.386 sq mi or 247 acres) and river estuaries.

Xaintray is a commune in the Deux-Sèvres department in western France.

== Population ==
Historical population
Year	Pop.	±% p.a.
1968	273	—
1975	211	−3.61%
1982	186	−1.79%
1990	200	+0.91%
1999	198	−0.11%
2007	230	+1.89%
2012	248	+1.52%
2017	223	−2.10%
2023	238	+1.09%
Source: INSEE

== See also ==
- Communes of the Deux-Sèvres department
