= Vautebis =

- Commune
- Location of Vautebis
- Location within France Location within Nouvelle-Aquitaine
- Coordinates: 46°32′08″N 0°09′05″W
- Country: France
- Region: Nouvelle-Aquitaine
- Department: Deux-Sèvres
- Arrondissement: Parthenay
- Canton: La Gâtine
- Intercommunality: CC Parthenay-Gâtine

Government
  - Mayor (2020–2026): Christian Ferjoux
- Area^{1}: 7.26 km^{2} (2.80 sq mi)
- Elevation: 185 m (607 ft)
- Highest elevation: 211 m (692 ft)
- Lowest elevation: 161 m (528 ft)
- Population (2023): 127
  - Density: 17.5/km^{2} (45.3/sq mi)
- Time zone: UTC+01:00 (CET)
  - Summer (DST): UTC+02:00 (CEST)
- INSEE/Postal code: 79341 /79420
- ^{1} French Land Register data, which excludes lakes, ponds, glaciers > 1 km^{2} (0.386 sq mi or 247 acres) and river estuaries.

Vautebis is a commune in the Deux-Sèvres department in western France.

== See also ==
- Communes of the Deux-Sèvres department
