= Béceleuf =

- Commune
- Location of Béceleuf
- Location within France Location within Nouvelle-Aquitaine
- Coordinates: 46°28′17″N 0°30′23″W
- Country: France
- Region: Nouvelle-Aquitaine
- Department: Deux-Sèvres
- Arrondissement: Parthenay
- Canton: Autize-Égray

Government
  - Mayor (2020–2026): Gilles Guilbot
- Area^{1}: 19.04 km^{2} (7.35 sq mi)
- Elevation: 140 m (460 ft)
- Highest elevation: 122 m (400 ft)
- Lowest elevation: 39 m (128 ft)
- Population (2023): 750
  - Density: 39/km^{2} (100/sq mi)
- Time zone: UTC+01:00 (CET)
  - Summer (DST): UTC+02:00 (CEST)
- INSEE/Postal code: 79032 /79160
- ^{1} French Land Register data, which excludes lakes, ponds, glaciers > 1 km^{2} (0.386 sq mi or 247 acres) and river estuaries.

Béceleuf is a commune in the Deux-Sèvres department in the Nouvelle-Aquitaine region in western France.

== See also ==
- Communes of the Deux-Sèvres department
