= Doux, Deux-Sèvres =

Doux
- Commune
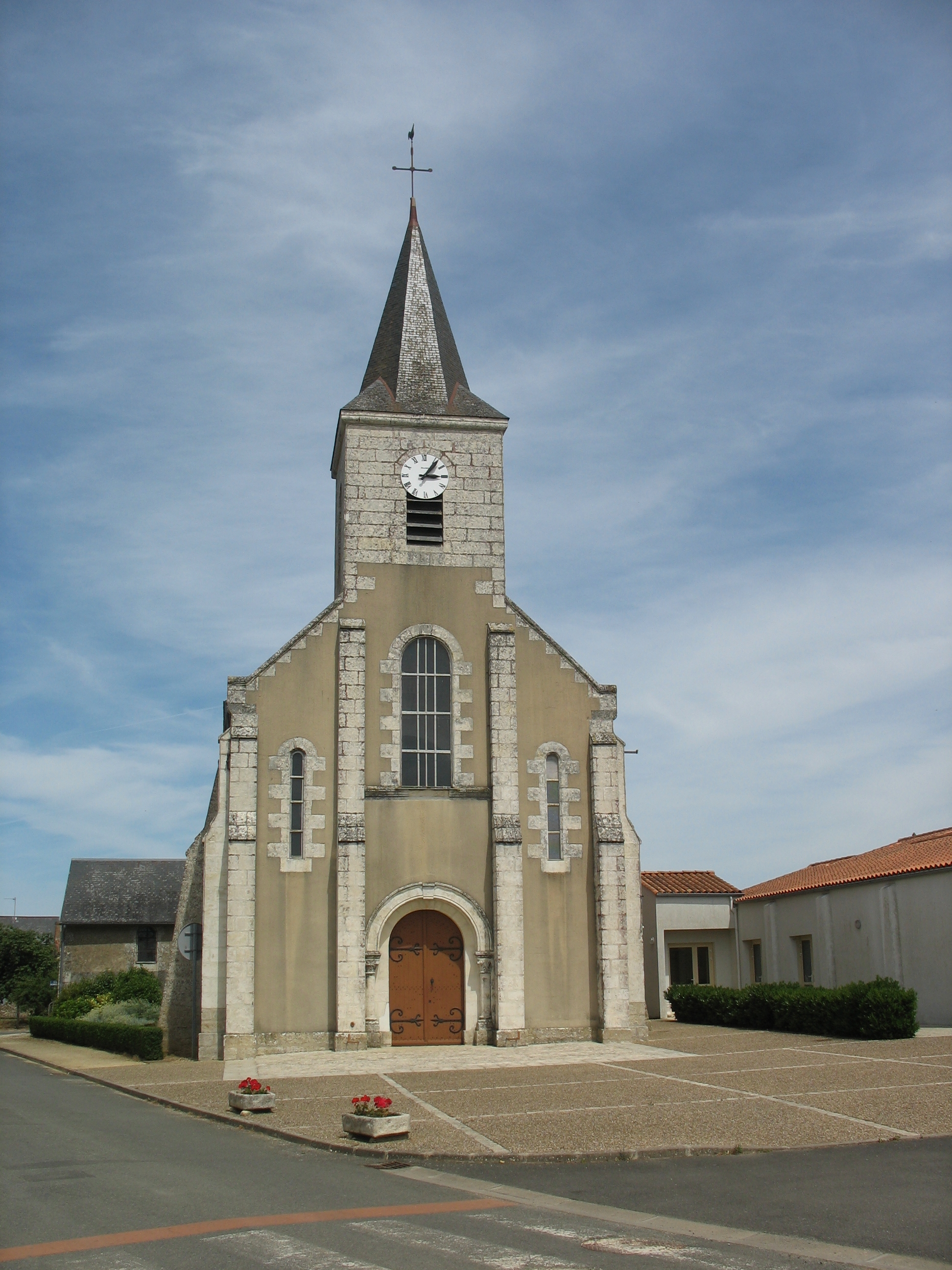
- The church in Doux
- Location of Doux
- Location within France Location within Nouvelle-Aquitaine
- Coordinates: 46°44′21″N 0°00′53″E
- Country: France
- Region: Nouvelle-Aquitaine
- Department: Deux-Sèvres
- Arrondissement: Parthenay
- Canton: La Gâtine
- Intercommunality: CC Parthenay-Gâtine

Government
  - Mayor (2020–2026): Lucien Jolivot
- Area^{1}: 9.85 km^{2} (3.80 sq mi)
- Elevation: 128 m (420 ft)
- Highest elevation: 153 m (502 ft)
- Lowest elevation: 103 m (338 ft)
- Population (2023): 204
  - Density: 20.7/km^{2} (53.6/sq mi)
- Time zone: UTC+01:00 (CET)
  - Summer (DST): UTC+02:00 (CEST)
- INSEE/Postal code: 79108 /79390
- ^{1} French Land Register data, which excludes lakes, ponds, glaciers > 1 km^{2} (0.386 sq mi or 247 acres) and river estuaries.

Doux (French pronunciation: [du]) is a commune in the Deux-Sèvres department in the Nouvelle-Aquitaine region in western France.

== See also ==
- Communes of the Deux-Sèvres department
