= Pressigny, Deux-Sèvres =

Pressigny
- Commune
- Location of Pressigny
- Location within France Location within Nouvelle-Aquitaine
- Coordinates: 46°44′55″N 0°05′27″W
- Country: France
- Region: Nouvelle-Aquitaine
- Department: Deux-Sèvres
- Arrondissement: Parthenay
- Canton: La Gâtine
- Intercommunality: CC Parthenay-Gâtine

Government
  - Mayor (2020–2026): Richard Wojtczak
- Area^{1}: 12.12 km^{2} (4.68 sq mi)
- Elevation: 150 m (490 ft)
- Highest elevation: 162 m (531 ft)
- Lowest elevation: 102 m (335 ft)
- Population (2023): 191
  - Density: 15.8/km^{2} (40.8/sq mi)
- Time zone: UTC+01:00 (CET)
  - Summer (DST): UTC+02:00 (CEST)
- INSEE/Postal code: 79218 /79390
- ^{1} French Land Register data, which excludes lakes, ponds, glaciers > 1 km^{2} (0.386 sq mi or 247 acres) and river estuaries.

Pressigny (French pronunciation: [pʁɛsiɲi]) is a commune in the Deux-Sèvres department in western France.

== See also ==
- Communes of the Deux-Sèvres department
