= Saint-Lin =

- Commune
- Location of Saint-Lin
- Location within France Location within Nouvelle-Aquitaine
- Coordinates: 46°31′44″N 0°14′23″W
- Country: France
- Region: Nouvelle-Aquitaine
- Department: Deux-Sèvres
- Arrondissement: Parthenay
- Canton: La Gâtine

Government
  - Mayor (2020–2026): Jérôme Libner
- Area^{1}: 11.21 km^{2} (4.33 sq mi)
- Elevation: 183 m (600 ft)
- Highest elevation: 215 m (705 ft)
- Lowest elevation: 133 m (436 ft)
- Population (2023): 310
  - Density: 28/km^{2} (72/sq mi)
- Time zone: UTC+01:00 (CET)
  - Summer (DST): UTC+02:00 (CEST)
- INSEE/Postal code: 79267 /79420
- ^{1} French Land Register data, which excludes lakes, ponds, glaciers > 1 km^{2} (0.386 sq mi or 247 acres) and river estuaries.

Saint-Lin (French pronunciation: [sɛ̃ lɛ̃]) is a commune in the Deux-Sèvres department in western France.

== See also ==
- Communes of the Deux-Sèvres department
