= Canton of La Gâtine =

Coordinates: 46°32′20″N 0°26′39″W

La Gâtine
- Canton
- Interactive map of La Gâtine
- Country: France
- Region: {{{region}}}
- Department: {{{department}}}
- No. of communes: {{{nbcomm}}}
- Area: 856.44 km^{2} (330.67 sq mi)
- Population (2023): 23,186
  - Density: 27.073/km^{2} (70.118/sq mi)
- INSEE code: {{{INSEE}}}

The canton of La Gâtine is a canton located in the arrondissement of Parthenay, in the department of Deux-Sèvres, in the Nouvelle-Aquitaine region of France. It was created following the French canton reorganisation which came into effect in March 2015. It consists of 38 communes:

1. Allonne
2. Aubigny
3. Azay-sur-Thouet
4. Beaulieu-sous-Parthenay
5. La Boissière-en-Gâtine
6. Les Châteliers
7. Clavé
8. Doux
9. La Ferrière-en-Parthenay
10. Fomperron
11. Les Forges
12. Gourgé
13. Les Groseillers
14. Lhoumois
15. Mazières-en-Gâtine
16. Ménigoute
17. Oroux
18. La Peyratte
19. Pougne-Hérisson
20. Pressigny
21. Reffannes
22. Le Retail
23. Saint-Aubin-le-Cloud
24. Saint-Georges-de-Noisné
25. Saint-Germier
26. Saint-Lin
27. Saint-Marc-la-Lande
28. Saint-Martin-du-Fouilloux
29. Saint-Pardoux-Soutiers
30. Saurais
31. Secondigny
32. Thénezay
33. Vasles
34. Vausseroux
35. Vautebis
36. Vernoux-en-Gâtine
37. Verruyes
38. Vouhé
