= Puihardy =

Puy Hardy
- Commune
- Location of Puy Hardy
- Location within France Location within Nouvelle-Aquitaine
- Coordinates: 46°31′27″N 0°32′09″W
- Country: France
- Region: Nouvelle-Aquitaine
- Department: Deux-Sèvres
- Arrondissement: Parthenay
- Canton: Autize-Égray

Government
  - Mayor (2020–2026): Patrice Douteau
- Area^{1}: 1.18 km^{2} (0.46 sq mi)
- Highest elevation: 140 m (460 ft)
- Lowest elevation: 64 m (210 ft)
- Population (2023): 58
  - Density: 49/km^{2} (130/sq mi)
- Time zone: UTC+01:00 (CET)
  - Summer (DST): UTC+02:00 (CEST)
- INSEE/Postal code: 79223 /79160
- ^{1} French Land Register data, which excludes lakes, ponds, glaciers > 1 km^{2} (0.386 sq mi or 247 acres) and river estuaries.

Puihardy (French pronunciation: [pɥi.aʁdi]) is a commune in the Deux-Sèvres department in western France.

== See also ==
- Communes of the Deux-Sèvres department
