= La Peyratte =

- Commune
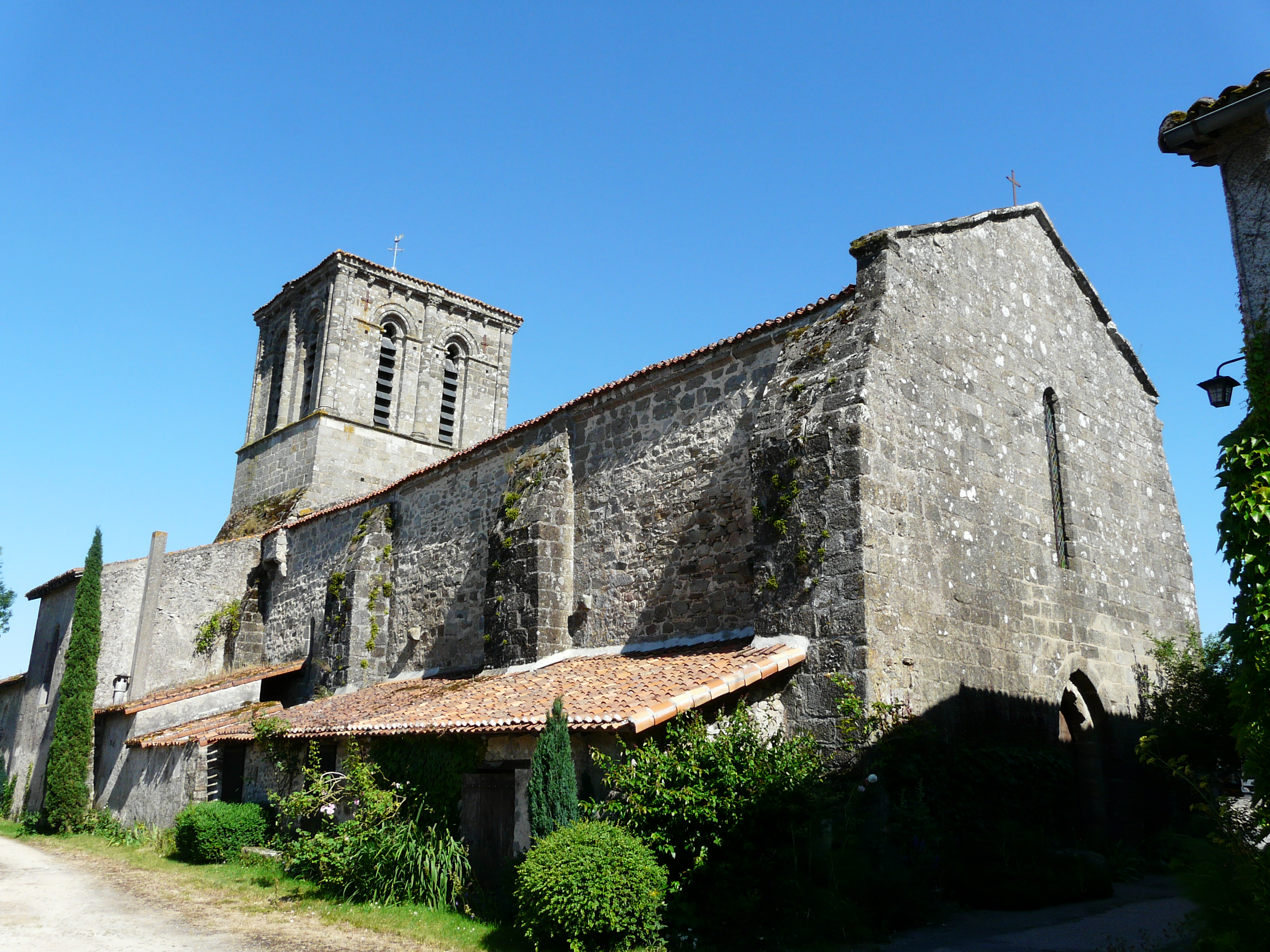
- The church in La Peyratte
- Location of La Peyratte
- Location within France Location within Nouvelle-Aquitaine
- Coordinates: 46°40′34″N 0°08′48″W
- Country: France
- Region: Nouvelle-Aquitaine
- Department: Deux-Sèvres
- Arrondissement: Parthenay
- Canton: La Gâtine
- Intercommunality: CC Parthenay-Gâtine

Government
  - Mayor (2020–2026): Jean-Claude Guerin
- Area^{1}: 46.86 km^{2} (18.09 sq mi)
- Elevation: 224 m (735 ft)
- Highest elevation: 192 m (630 ft)
- Lowest elevation: 102 m (335 ft)
- Population (2023): 1,105
  - Density: 23.58/km^{2} (61.07/sq mi)
- Time zone: UTC+01:00 (CET)
  - Summer (DST): UTC+02:00 (CEST)
- INSEE/Postal code: 79208 /79200
- ^{1} French Land Register data, which excludes lakes, ponds, glaciers > 1 km^{2} (0.386 sq mi or 247 acres) and river estuaries.

La Peyratte (French pronunciation: [la peʁat]) is a commune in the Deux-Sèvres department in western France.

== See also ==
- Communes of the Deux-Sèvres department
