= Pamplie =

- Commune
- Location of Pamplie
- Location within France Location within Nouvelle-Aquitaine
- Coordinates: 46°32′15″N 0°26′20″W
- Country: France
- Region: Nouvelle-Aquitaine
- Department: Deux-Sèvres
- Arrondissement: Parthenay
- Canton: Autize-Égray

Government
  - Mayor (2020–2026): Patrick Petorin
- Area^{1}: 12.29 km^{2} (4.75 sq mi)
- Elevation: 130 m (430 ft)
- Highest elevation: 167 m (548 ft)
- Lowest elevation: 77 m (253 ft)
- Population (2023): 249
  - Density: 20.3/km^{2} (52.5/sq mi)
- Time zone: UTC+01:00 (CET)
  - Summer (DST): UTC+02:00 (CEST)
- INSEE/Postal code: 79200 /79220
- ^{1} French Land Register data, which excludes lakes, ponds, glaciers > 1 km^{2} (0.386 sq mi or 247 acres) and river estuaries.

Pamplie (French pronunciation: [pɑ̃pli]) is a commune in the Deux-Sèvres department in western France, located roughly 23 km (15 miles) to the north of Niort.

== See also ==
- Communes of the Deux-Sèvres department
