= Saint-Martin-du-Fouilloux, Deux-Sèvres =

Saint-Martin-du-Fouilloux
- Commune
- Location of Saint-Martin-du-Fouilloux
- Location within France Location within Nouvelle-Aquitaine
- Coordinates: 46°35′27″N 0°07′11″W
- Country: France
- Region: Nouvelle-Aquitaine
- Department: Deux-Sèvres
- Arrondissement: Parthenay
- Canton: La Gâtine
- Intercommunality: CC Parthenay-Gâtine

Government
  - Mayor (2020–2026): Patrice Bergeon
- Area^{1}: 23.97 km^{2} (9.25 sq mi)
- Elevation: 272 m (892 ft)
- Highest elevation: 272 m (892 ft)
- Lowest elevation: 162 m (531 ft)
- Population (2023): 253
  - Density: 10.6/km^{2} (27.3/sq mi)
- Time zone: UTC+01:00 (CET)
  - Summer (DST): UTC+02:00 (CEST)
- INSEE/Postal code: 79278 /79420
- ^{1} French Land Register data, which excludes lakes, ponds, glaciers > 1 km^{2} (0.386 sq mi or 247 acres) and river estuaries.

Saint-Martin-du-Fouilloux (French pronunciation: [sɛ̃ maʁtɛ̃ dy fuju]) is a commune in the Deux-Sèvres department in western France.

== See also ==
- Communes of the Deux-Sèvres department
