= Secondigny =

- Commune
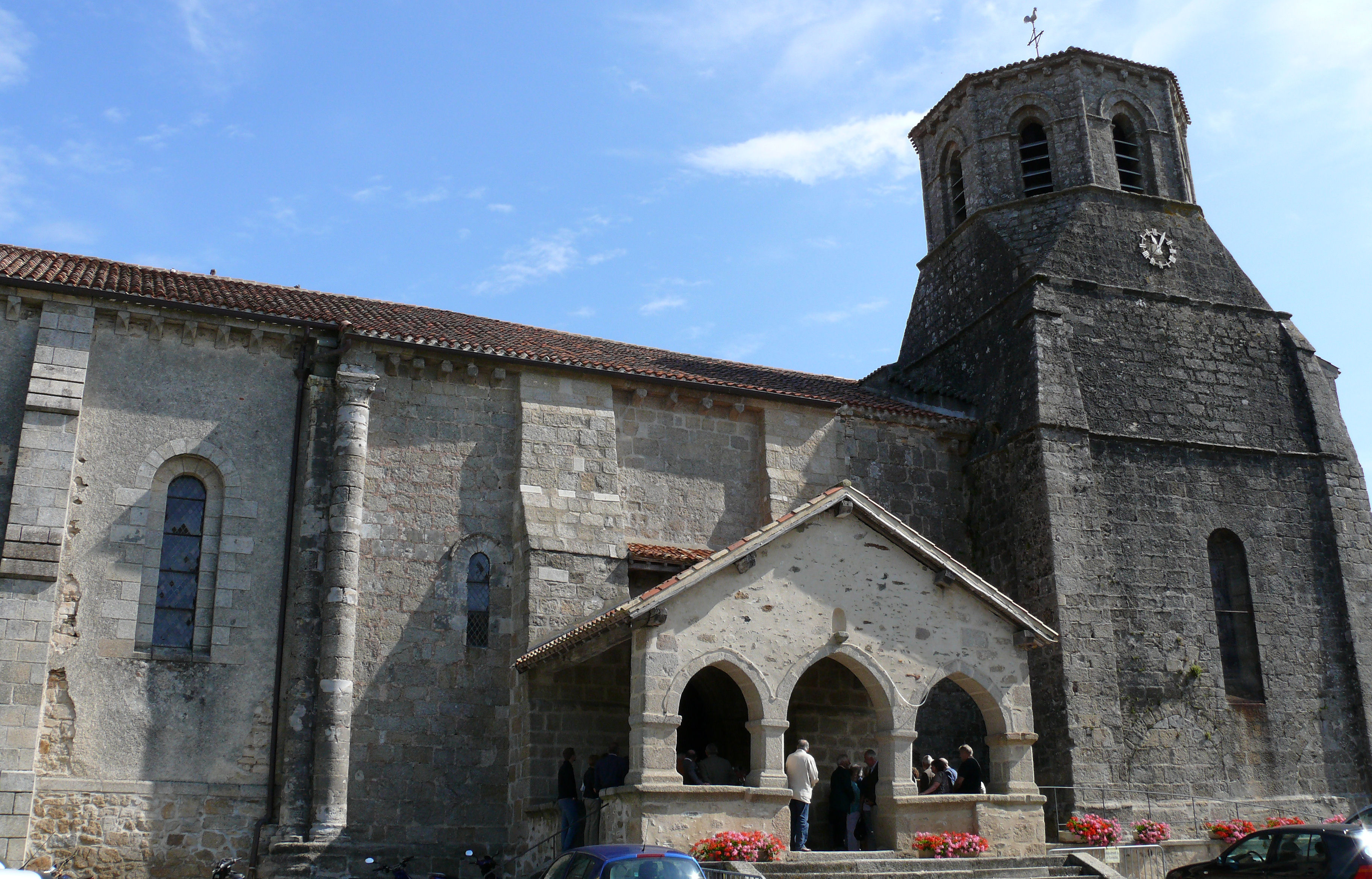
- The church in Secondigny
- Location of Secondigny
- Location within France Location within Nouvelle-Aquitaine
- Coordinates: 46°36′33″N 0°25′10″W
- Country: France
- Region: Nouvelle-Aquitaine
- Department: Deux-Sèvres
- Arrondissement: Parthenay
- Canton: La Gâtine
- Intercommunality: CC Parthenay-Gâtine
- Area^{1}: 37 km^{2} (14 sq mi)
- Population (2023): 1,765
  - Density: 48/km^{2} (120/sq mi)
- Time zone: UTC+01:00 (CET)
  - Summer (DST): UTC+02:00 (CEST)
- INSEE/Postal code: 79311 /
- ^{1} French Land Register data, which excludes lakes, ponds, glaciers > 1 km^{2} (0.386 sq mi or 247 acres) and river estuaries.

Secondigny (French pronunciation: [səɡɔ̃diɲi]) is a commune in the Deux-Sèvres department in western France.

It is situated about 14 km west of the town of Parthenay and 35 km north of Niort.

Secondigny is the source of the Thouet, a river that flows east and then north before joining the Loire near Saumur. Just to the west of Secondigny is the source of the Sèvre Nantaise, which flows west and north to join the Loire in Nantes.

== Notable people ==
- Michel Menu, engineer and author

== See also ==
- Communes of the Deux-Sèvres department
