= Communauté de communes de Parthenay-Gâtine =

Federation of municipalities in France

Coordinates: 46.65°N 0.25°W

Parthenay-Gâtine
- Communauté de communes
- Country: France
- Region: Nouvelle-Aquitaine
- Department: Deux-Sèvres
- No. of communes: {{{nbcomm}}}
- Area: 836.2 km^{2} (322.9 sq mi)
- Population (2018): 37,381
  - Density: 44.70/km^{2} (115.8/sq mi)
- Website: www.cc-parthenay-gatine.fr

The Communauté de communes de Parthenay-Gâtine is the communauté de communes, an intercommunal structure, centred on the town of Parthenay. It is located in the Deux-Sèvres department, in the Nouvelle-Aquitaine region, western France. It was created in January 2014 by the merger of the former Communauté de communes de Parthenay with 3 other former communautés de communes. Its seat is Parthenay. Its area is 836.2 km^{2}, and its population was 37,381 in 2018, of which 10,235 in Parthenay proper. It provides a framework within which local tasks common to the member communes can be carried out together. Amongst its other responsibilities, the communauté de communes organises the Festival Ludique International de Parthenay, a major games festival held in Parthenay every July.

The former communauté de communes de Parthenay was established in 2001 by six communes in the Parthenay area. In 2010, the commune of Fénery joined the community.

== Communes ==
The communauté de communes consists of the following 38 communes:

1. Adilly
2. Allonne
3. Amailloux
4. Aubigny
5. Azay-sur-Thouet
6. La Chapelle-Bertrand
7. Les Châteliers
8. Châtillon-sur-Thouet
9. Doux
10. Fénery
11. La Ferrière-en-Parthenay
12. Fomperron
13. Les Forges
14. Gourgé
15. Lageon
16. Lhoumois
17. Ménigoute
18. Oroux
19. Parthenay
20. La Peyratte
21. Pompaire
22. Pougne-Hérisson
23. Pressigny
24. Reffannes
25. Le Retail
26. Saint-Aubin-le-Cloud
27. Saint-Germain-de-Longue-Chaume
28. Saint-Germier
29. Saint-Martin-du-Fouilloux
30. Saurais
31. Secondigny
32. Le Tallud
33. Thénezay
34. Vasles
35. Vausseroux
36. Vautebis
37. Vernoux-en-Gâtine
38. Viennay
