= Vouhé, Deux-Sèvres =

Vouhé
- Commune
- Location of Vouhé
- Location within France Location within Nouvelle-Aquitaine
- Coordinates: 46°33′32″N 0°14′51″W
- Country: France
- Region: Nouvelle-Aquitaine
- Department: Deux-Sèvres
- Arrondissement: Parthenay
- Canton: La Gâtine
- Intercommunality: Val-de-Gâtine

Government
  - Mayor (2020–2026): Dominique Meen
- Area^{1}: 13.95 km^{2} (5.39 sq mi)
- Elevation: 223 m (732 ft)
- Highest elevation: 226 m (741 ft)
- Lowest elevation: 149 m (489 ft)
- Population (2023): 356
  - Density: 25.5/km^{2} (66.1/sq mi)
- Time zone: UTC+01:00 (CET)
  - Summer (DST): UTC+02:00 (CEST)
- INSEE/Postal code: 79354 /79310
- ^{1} French Land Register data, which excludes lakes, ponds, glaciers > 1 km^{2} (0.386 sq mi or 247 acres) and river estuaries.

Vouhé (French pronunciation: [vu.e]) is a commune in the Deux-Sèvres department in western France.

== See also ==
- Communes of the Deux-Sèvres department
