= Parthenay =

Parthenay Partenaes (Poitevin–Saintongeais)
- Subprefecture and commune
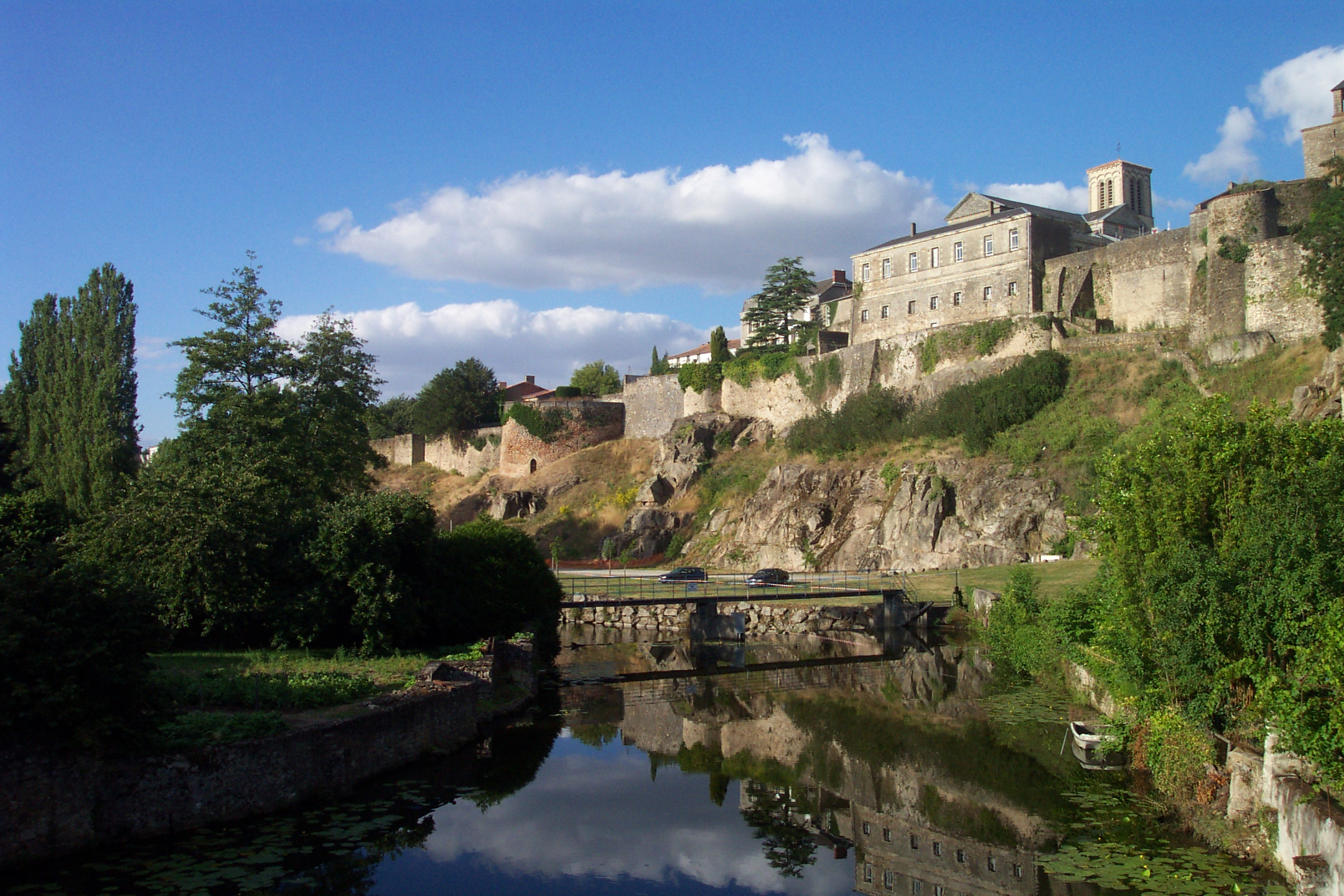
- The west side of the Partenay citadel from the Saint-Paul Bridge over the River Thouet

- Coat of arms
- Location of Parthenay
- Location within France Location within Nouvelle-Aquitaine
- Coordinates: 46°38′46″N 0°14′52″W
- Country: France
- Region: Nouvelle-Aquitaine
- Department: Deux-Sèvres
- Arrondissement: Parthenay
- Canton: Parthenay
- Intercommunality: CC Parthenay-Gâtine

Government
  - Mayor (2020–2026): Jean Michel Prieur (AC)
- Area^{1}: 11.38 km^{2} (4.39 sq mi)
- Highest elevation: 184 m (604 ft)
- Lowest elevation: 114 m (374 ft)
- Population (2023): 10,140
  - Density: 891.0/km^{2} (2,308/sq mi)
- Time zone: UTC+01:00 (CET)
  - Summer (DST): UTC+02:00 (CEST)
- INSEE/Postal code: 79202 /79200
- ^{1} French Land Register data, which excludes lakes, ponds, glaciers > 1 km^{2} (0.386 sq mi or 247 acres) and river estuaries.

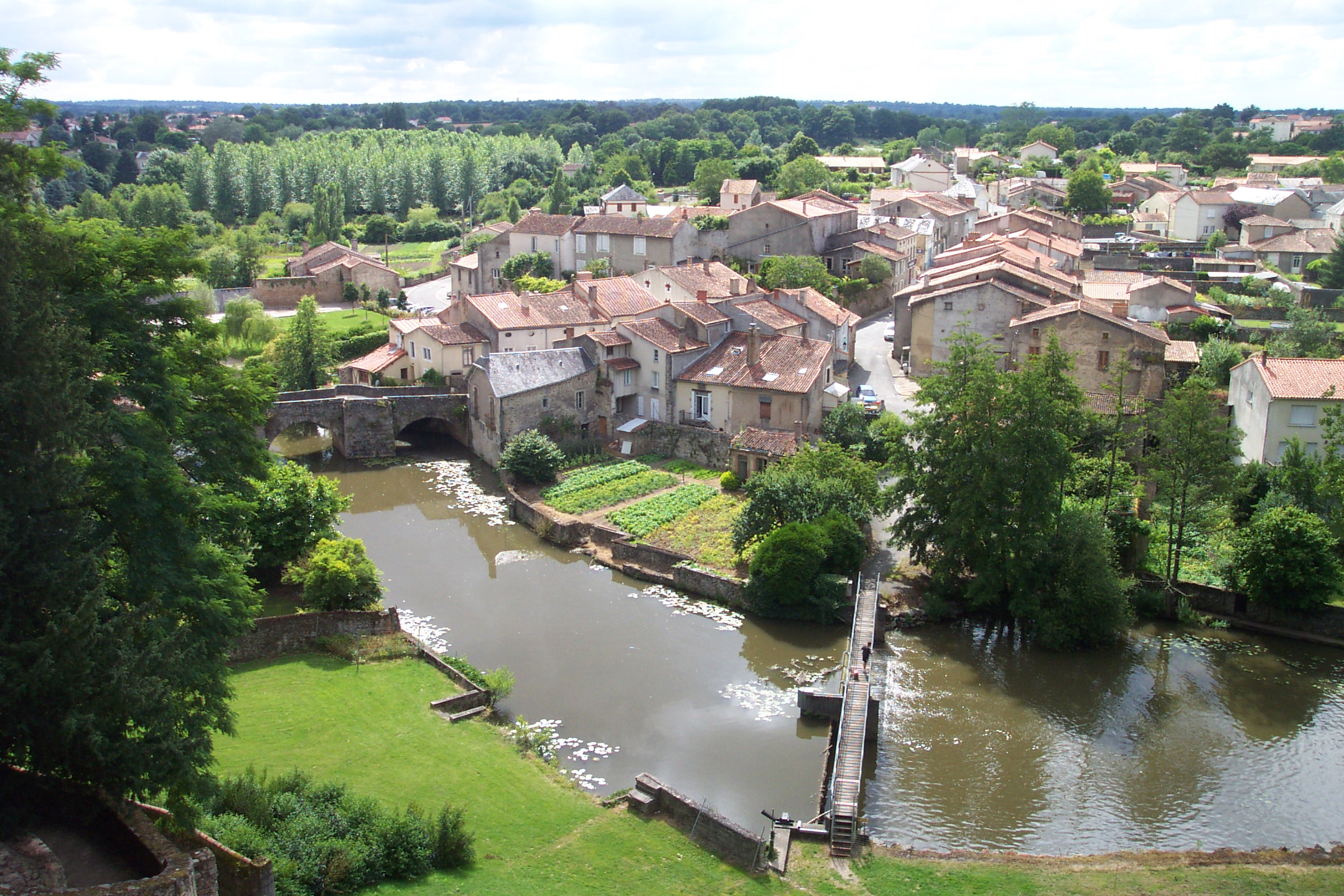
The Saint-Paul district and the River Thouet from the battlements of the citadel

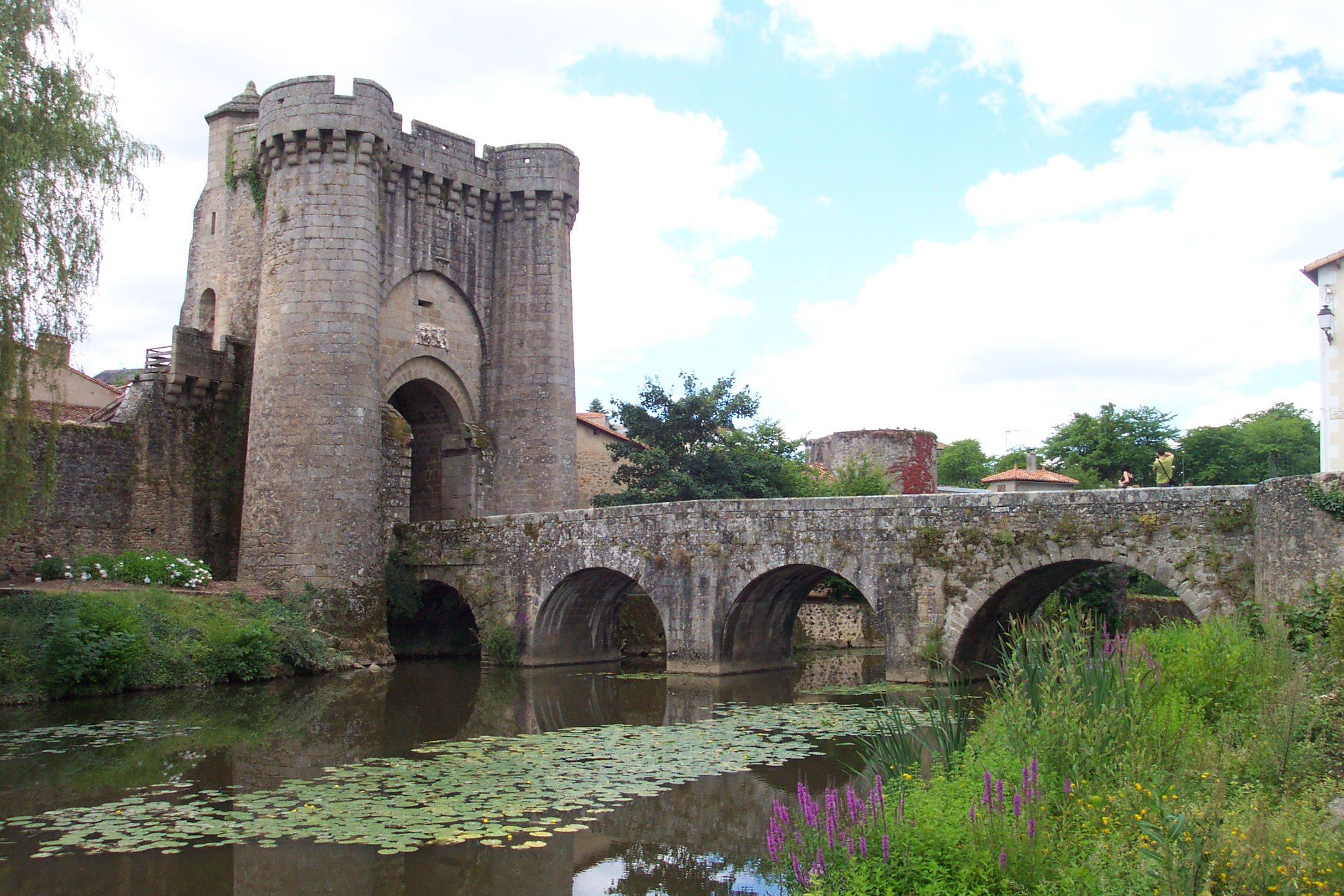
The Saint-Jacques Gate and Bridge, by which mediaeval pilgrims would have entered the town from the north

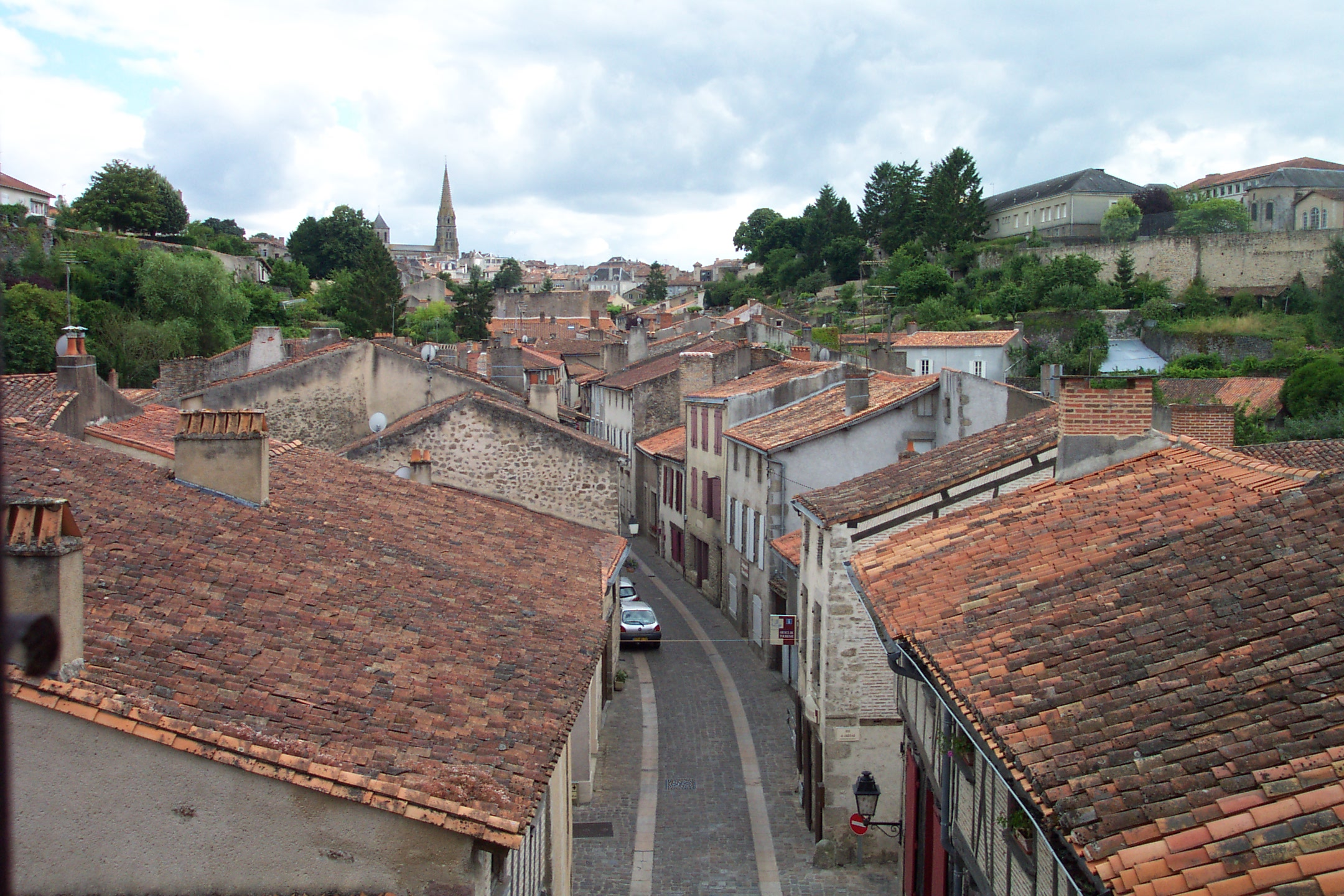
The Rue de la Vau Saint-Jaques from the upper chamber of the Saint-Jacques Gate, with the town centre on the skyline ahead, and the east side of the citadel to the right

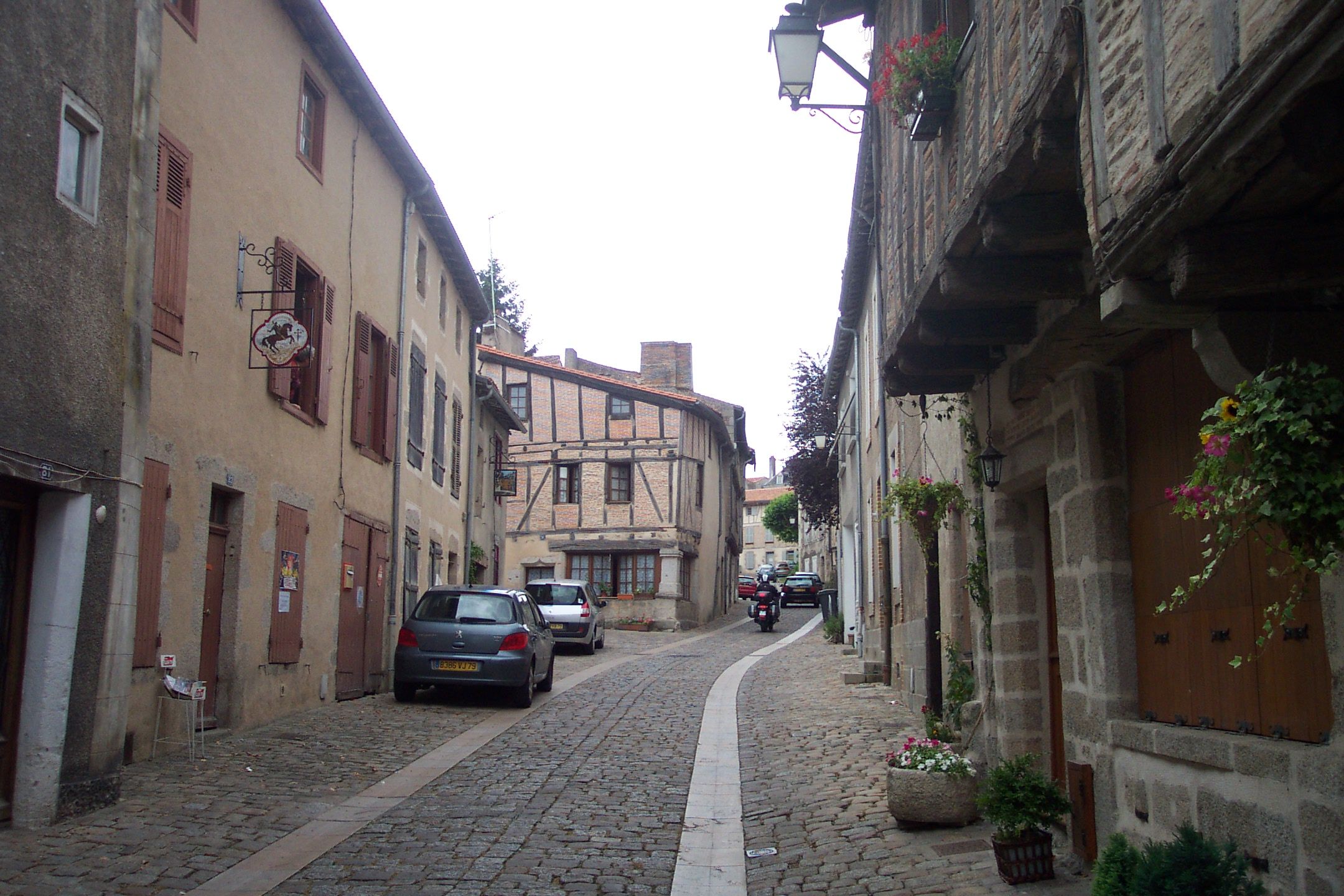
The Rue de la Vau Saint-Jaques from street level

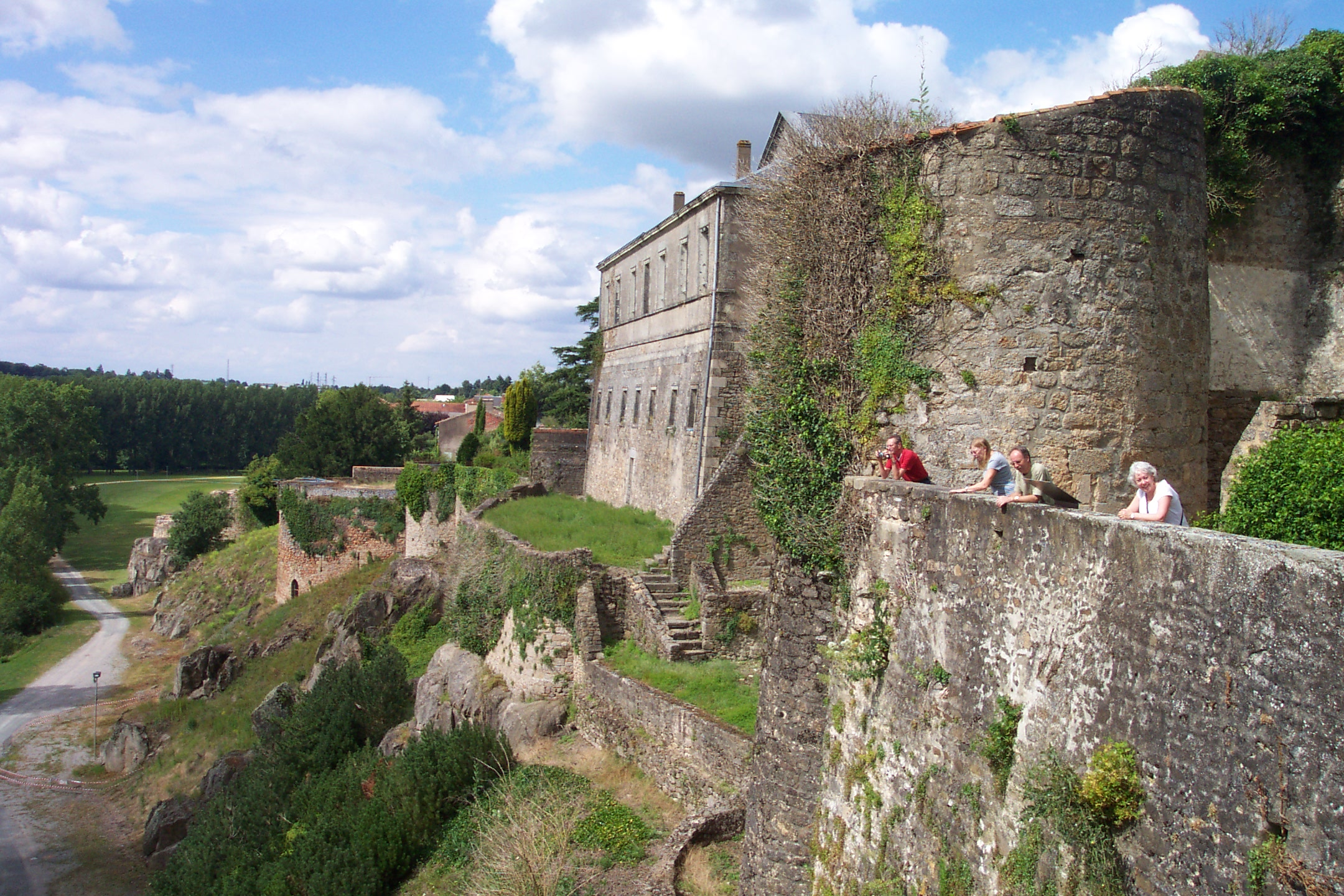
The western town walls

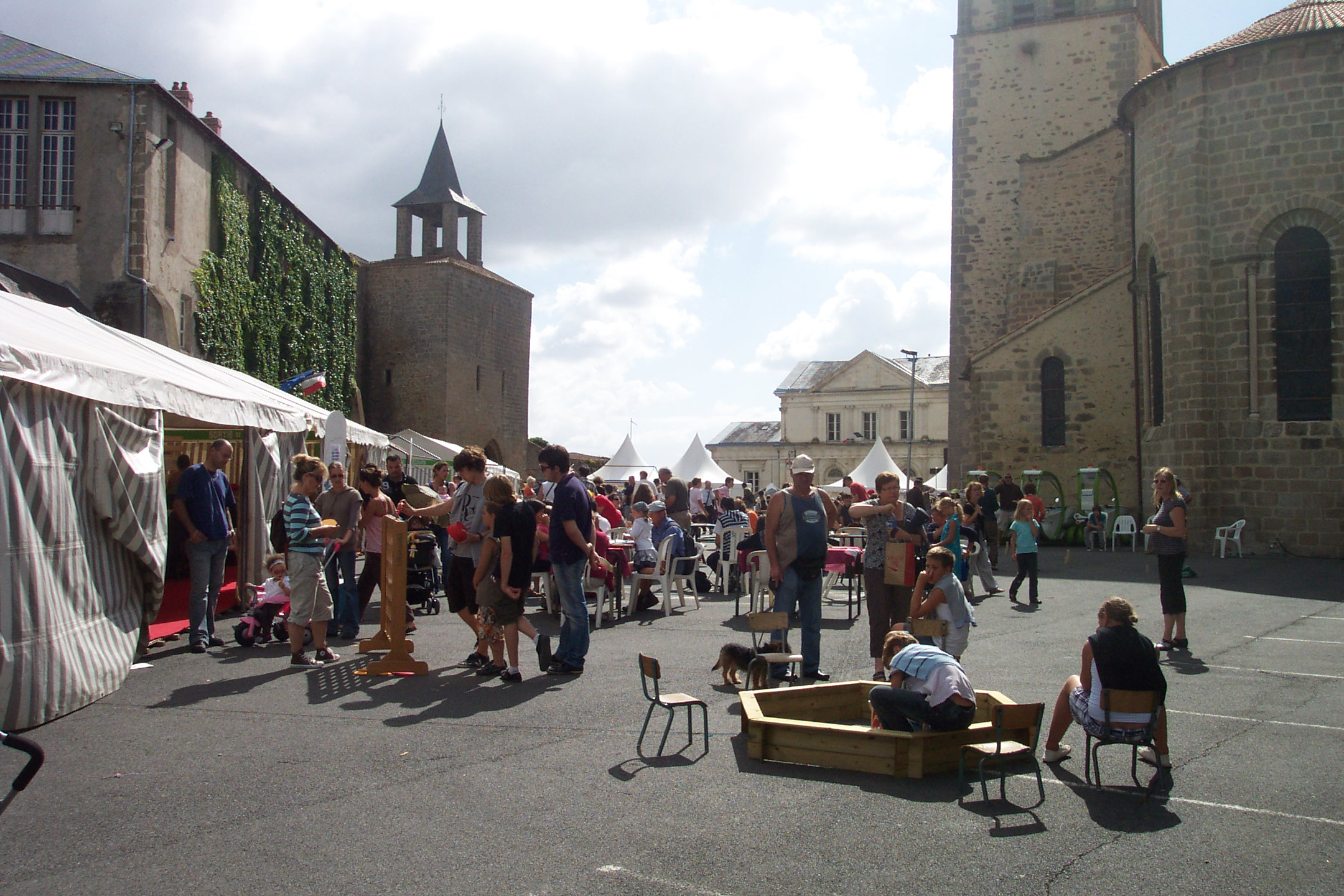
Inside the citadel during FLIP 2010; from left to right the Mairie, the Porte de l'Horloge, the law courts, and the Église Sainte-Croix.

Parthenay (French: [paʁtənɛ]; Poitevin: Partenaes) is an ancient fortified town and commune in the Deux-Sèvres department of the Nouvelle-Aquitaine region in western France. It is sited on a rocky spur that is surrounded on two sides by the River Thouet, and is the sub-prefecture of the Parthenay arrondissement.

It is situated some 40 km (25 mi) north of Niort, 50 km (31 mi) west of Poitiers, 120 km (75 mi) south-east of Nantes, and 350 km (220 mi) south-west of Paris.

Each July, Parthenay hosts the Festival Ludique International de Parthenay, otherwise known as the Festival de Jeux or FLIP, in which the town's streets and squares are filled with games of many types. The shorter indoor FLIP d'hiver runs in November.

== History ==
Legend has it that Parthenay was created with a wave of the fairy Melusine's wand. However the name of Parthenay first appears in written records at the beginning of the 11th century and there is no evidence of previous significant human occupation in the Middle Ages.

The castle, situated on an easily defended site at the tip of the rocky promontory surrounded by the loop of the river, was built in the 13th century. At the same time the outer fortifications protecting the citadel, and the town itself, were completed.

Economically, Parthenay benefited by being on one of the branches of the Way of St. James, the mediaeval pilgrimage route to Santiago de Compostela in Spain. The main fortified gate, by which pilgrims would enter the town, still bears the name of Saint Jacques (the French name for Saint James).

Historically, Parthenay was considered the capital of the Gâtine Vendéenne, the hilly and wooded area that occupies the centre of the current department of Deux-Sèvres and is quite different in character from the plains to the south, around Niort. Because of the nature of the land, the area became known for the breeding of cattle, and the Parthenais breed is named after the town.

It was not until the 19th century that the town expanded beyond its walls. Wide boulevards and squares were constructed following the line of the old town wall and moat to the east of the town. Beyond these, the railway station was built in 1880, and new districts and industries grew up around this.

== Geography ==
The medieval walled town of Parthenay is constructed in a bend of the River Thouet, which surrounds the town on the west and north sides. The highest ground within the walls lies to the south, where the current town centre lies. To the north and west, a spur of high ground runs above cliffs which descend vertically to the riverside park of La Prée. At the northern end of this spur, with the river on two sides, are the remains of the towns fortified chateau. Between the chateau and the town centre along the top of the spur is the citadel, protected by the city wall along the top of the cliffs to the west, and by its own inner walls to the south and east.

To the east of the citadel and the north of the town centre, the land slopes more gently down a small valley to the river. Running down the middle of this valley can be found the Rue de la Vau Saint-Jaques, a narrow mediaeval street that climbs up from the bridge and gateway of the Porte Saint-Jacques to the centre of town. In time of the pilgrimage, this would have been the main pilgrimage route south through the town, and was occupied by weavers.

Outside the city walls, the district of Saint-Jacques occupies land at the northern side of the Saint-Jacques bridge, and was also an area of weavers in mediaeval times. To the west of the town centre, the district of Saint-Paul spills down the steep hill to the river, across the Saint-Paul bridge and around the former Saint-Paul's Priory, founded in the 11th century. The Saint-Paul's district was the home of the town's tanners.

Later expansions to the east and south of the walled town date from the nineteenth century and later, and were encouraged by the construction of the railway and, more recently, the town's eastern by-pass road.

== Population ==
Historical population
Year	Pop.	±% p.a.
1968	11,334	—
1975	12,728	+1.67%
1982	11,395	−1.57%
1990	10,809	−0.66%
1999	10,466	−0.36%
2007	10,415	−0.06%
2012	10,300	−0.22%
2017	10,267	−0.06%
2023	10,140	−0.21%
Source: INSEE

== Government ==
In 2001, the commune of Parthenay joined together with six neighbouring communes to establish the Communauté de communes de Parthenay, which provides a framework within which local tasks are carried out together. This intercommunality was merged into the Communauté de communes de Parthenay-Gâtine in 2014. The new intercommunality has 39 communes, a population of 37,817 (2014) in an area of 836.2 km^{2} (322.9 sq mi).

== Transport ==
Parthenay is located on the Route nationale 149 (RN149), which runs roughly east–west from Nantes to Poitiers, and which forms part of the European route E62 from Nantes to Genoa. The RN149 is a conventional highway, and has to a certain extent been by-passed by a combination of the autoroutes A83 and A10 that passes some 25 km (16 mi) to the south of Parthenay. Other major roads link Parthenay to Niort, Saumur, Saint-Maixent-l'École and La Roche-sur-Yon. Through traffic can avoid passing through the old town by using a by-pass road that encircles the town at a distance of about 2 km (1.2 mi).

Parthenay railway station was formerly a junction on the SNCF rail system, with lines to Niort, Thouars, Poitiers and Bressuire. However, only the lines to Niort and Thouars survive, and these lines now only carry freight trains. The région of Nouvelle-Aquitaine provides inter-urban bus service that connects Parthenay to Niort, Bressuire, Thouars, Poitiers and other local towns and villages.

The nearest airports are at Poitiers (Poitiers - Biard Airport) and Nantes (Nantes Atlantique Airport).

== Main sights ==
The medieval centre of Parthenay contains a number of sights, including:

- The Town Walls, which are particularly visible to the west and north, where they sit on top of and incorporate a high granite outcrop. The outer town walls to the east and south have largely been removed, although their course can still be inferred from the wide boulevards that replaced them, but the eastern wall of the inner citadel can still be seen, rising above the Rue de la Vau Saint-Jaques.
- The Porte St-Jacques and Pont St-Jacques form the entry into the walled town from the north. The bridge crosses the River Thouet before passing through the heavily fortified gateway, which was built in the early 13th century. This would have been the entry into the town used by the pilgrims. Today's visitors can reach the top of the gatehouse, which provides views over the river and lower part of the town.
- The Rue de la Vau Saint-Jaques is a narrow street lined with medieval timber-framed houses, with vegetable plots climbing the slopes that rise above either side of the street. At one time this would have been the main pilgrimage route from the Porte St-Jacques up to the town centre, and was occupied by weavers. Many of the houses retain the wooden ground floor shutters that folded down to form a stall.
- The Porte de l'Horloge is the fortified gateway into the citadel from the town centre, and dates from the 13th century. In 1454, a bell was added to toll the hours, and subsequently clock faces were added to the tower.
- The Église Sainte-Croix is a romanesque church within the citadel, adjacent to the mairie and law courts. It was founded in the 11th century.
- The Église Saint-Laurent is a parish church in the centre of the town which is believed to date from the early 11th century. It has been rebuilt several times and has both romanesque and gothic features.
- The Chapelle des Cordeliers is a 13th-century chapel constructed by the Order of St Francis, known in France as the Cordeliers for the chord they wore at their waist. A small side chapel dating from the 16th century houses a fine renaissance altarpiece.
- The sculpture "La Rivière" by Pierre Charles Lenoir is held in Parthenay Mairie.

== Climate ==
Climate data for Parthenay (1993–2020 normals, extremes 1948–present)
Month	Jan	Feb	Mar	Apr	May	Jun	Jul	Aug	Sep	Oct	Nov	Dec	Year
Record high °C (°F)	17.2 (63.0)	22.9 (73.2)	25.5 (77.9)	29.1 (84.4)	32.6 (90.7)	38.8 (101.8)	40.4 (104.7)	41.3 (106.3)	35.5 (95.9)	30.3 (86.5)	21.7 (71.1)	18.3 (64.9)	41.3 (106.3)
Mean daily maximum °C (°F)	8.3 (46.9)	9.7 (49.5)	13.2 (55.8)	16.5 (61.7)	20.2 (68.4)	24.2 (75.6)	26.6 (79.9)	26.6 (79.9)	22.8 (73.0)	17.6 (63.7)	12.0 (53.6)	8.8 (47.8)	17.2 (63.0)
Daily mean °C (°F)	5.4 (41.7)	6.0 (42.8)	8.5 (47.3)	11.1 (52.0)	14.6 (58.3)	18.2 (64.8)	20.2 (68.4)	20.0 (68.0)	16.6 (61.9)	13.1 (55.6)	8.4 (47.1)	5.8 (42.4)	12.3 (54.1)
Mean daily minimum °C (°F)	2.5 (36.5)	2.2 (36.0)	3.7 (38.7)	5.6 (42.1)	9.0 (48.2)	12.1 (53.8)	13.8 (56.8)	13.5 (56.3)	10.4 (50.7)	8.7 (47.7)	4.9 (40.8)	2.8 (37.0)	7.4 (45.3)
Record low °C (°F)	−11.8 (10.8)	−10.1 (13.8)	−11.9 (10.6)	−4.2 (24.4)	−1.7 (28.9)	3.7 (38.7)	5.7 (42.3)	5.1 (41.2)	1.4 (34.5)	−3.2 (26.2)	−9.7 (14.5)	−11.2 (11.8)	−11.9 (10.6)
Average precipitation mm (inches)	90.8 (3.57)	64.1 (2.52)	60.3 (2.37)	61.0 (2.40)	62.5 (2.46)	53.8 (2.12)	46.1 (1.81)	50.1 (1.97)	59.8 (2.35)	90.6 (3.57)	91.9 (3.62)	99.6 (3.92)	830.6 (32.70)
Average precipitation days (≥ 1.0 mm)	11.8	10.3	9.9	9.6	9.4	7.9	7.0	6.9	7.9	11.5	12.6	12.5	117.4
Source: Meteociel

== See also ==
- Communes of the Deux-Sèvres department
