= List of windmills in Deux-Sèvres =

A list of windmills in Deux-Sèvres, France.

Location	Name of mill	Type	Built	Notes	Photograph
Adilly	Moulin d'Adilly	Moulin Tour		Moulins-a-Vent (in French)	
Airvault	Moulin d'Airvault #1	Moulin Tour		Moulins-a-Vent (in French)	
Airvault	Moulin d'Airvault #2	Moulin Tour		Moulins-a-Vent (in French)	
Airvault	Moulin d'Airvault #3	Moulin Tour		Moulins-a-Vent (in French)	
Airvault	Moulin d'Airvault #4	Moulin Tour		Moulins-a-Vent (in French)	
Airvault	Moulin de Pain Gagné	Moulin Tour		Moulins-a-Vent (in French)	
Amailloux	Moulin d'Amailloux	Moulin Tour		Moulins-a-Vent (in French)	
Amuré	Moulin de Guinier	Moulin Tour		Moulins-a-Vent (in French)	
Argenton-Château	Moulin des Plaines de Boësses	Moulin Tour		Moulins-a-Vent (in French)	
Assais-les-Jumeaux	Moulin d'Assais les Jumeaux	Moulin Tour		Moulins-a-Vent (in French)	
Availles-Thouarsais	Moulin d'Availles Thouarsais	Moulin Tour		Moulins-a-Vent (in French)	
Beauvoir-sur-Niort	Moulin de Raimbault	Moulin Tour		Moulins-a-Vent (in French)	
Boussais	Moulin de Boussais #1	Moulin Tour		Moulins-a-Vent (in French)	
Boussais	Moulin de Boussais #2	Moulin Tour		Moulins-a-Vent (in French)	
Boussais	Moulin de Boussais #3	Moulin Tour		Moulins-a-Vent (in French)	
Boussais	Moulin de Boussais #4	Moulin Tour		Moulins-a-Vent (in French)	
Bressuire	Moulin de Maison Neuve	Moulin Tour		Moulins-a-Vent (in French)	
Châtillon-sur-Thouet	Moulin de Châtillon sur Thouet	Moulin Tour		Moulins-a-Vent (in French)	
Chiché	Moulin au Pressous	Moulin Tour		Moulins-a-Vent (in French)	
Chiché	Moulin de la Missardière	Moulin Tour		Moulins-a-Vent (in French)	
Chiché	Moulin d'Aumont #1	Moulin Tour		Moulins-a-Vent (in French)	
Chiché	Moulin d'Aumont #2	Moulin Tour		Moulins-a-Vent (in French)	
Clessé	Moulin du Peu	Moulin Tour		Moulins-a-Vent (in French)	
Clessé	Moulin du Doué	Moulin Tour		Moulins-a-Vent (in French)	
Clessé	Moulin de la Roche Bagard	Moulin Tour		Moulins-a-Vent (in French)	
Fors	Moulin de Fors	Moulin Tour		Moulins-a-Vent (in French)	
Fors	Le Petit Moulin	Moulin Tour		Moulins-a-Vent (in French)	
Geay	Moulin de Bel Air	Moulin Tour		Moulins-a-Vent (in French)	
Glénay	Moulin de Glénay #1	Moulin Tour		Moulins-a-Vent (in French)	
Glénay	Moulin de Glénay #2	Moulin Tour		Moulins-a-Vent (in French)	
Glénay	Moulin de la Grand Mousinière	Moulin Tour		Moulins-a-Vent (in French)	
Glénay	Moulin de Bellevue	Moulin Tour		Moulins-a-Vent (in French)	
Juscorps	Moulin de Picardie	Moulin Tour		Moulins-a-Vent (in French)	
La Coudre	Moulin de la Grève	Moulin Tour		Moulins-a-Vent (in French)	
La Coudre	Moulin de Chiron	Moulin Tour		Moulins-a-Vent (in French)	
Le Chillou	Moulin de l'Orangerie	Moulin Tour		Moulins-a-Vent (in French)	
Les Aubiers	Moulins de Les Aubiers #1	Moulin Tour		Moulins-a-Vent (in French)	
Les Aubiers	Moulins de Les Aubiers #2	Moulin Tour		Moulins-a-Vent (in French)	
Les Aubiers	Moulins de Les Aubiers #3	Moulin Tour		Moulins-a-Vent (in French)	
Les Aubiers	Moulins de Les Aubiers #4	Moulin Tour		Moulins-a-Vent (in French)	
Lhoumois	Moulin de Bel Air	Moulin Tour		Moulins-a-Vent (in French)	
Louin	Moulin de Louin	Moulin Tour		Moulins-a-Vent (in French)	
Luzay	Moulin de Luzay #1	Moulin Tour		Moulins-a-Vent (in French)	
Luzay	Moulin de Luzay #2	Moulin Tour		Moulins-a-Vent (in French)	
Missé	Moulin de Missé	Moulin Tour		Moulins-a-Vent (in French)	
Nantilly	Moulin de Bel Air	Moulin Tour		Moulins-a-Vent (in French)	
Neuvy-Bouin	Moulin de Neuvy Bouin	Moulin Tour		Moulins-a-Vent (in French)	
Noirterre	Moulin de la Cave	Moulin Tour		Moulins-a-Vent (in French)	
Noirterre	Moulin des Six Ailes	Moulin Tour		Moulins-a-Vent (in French)	
Saint-Aubin-du-Plain	Moulin de St Aubin du Plain #1	Moulin Tour		Moulins-a-Vent (in French)	
Saint-Aubin-du-Plain	Moulin de St Aubin du Plain #2	Moulin Tour		Moulins-a-Vent (in French)	
Saint-Aubin-du-Plain	Moulin de St Aubin du Plain #3	Moulin Tour		Moulins-a-Vent (in French)	
Saint-Aubin-le-Cloud	Moulin de la Satière	Moulin Tour		Moulins-a-Vent (in French)	
Saint-Christophe-sur-Roc	Moulin des Coteaux de l'Épave	Moulin Tour	1850	Moulins-a-Vent (in French)	
		Moulin Tour		Moulins-a-Vent] (in French)	
Saint-Clémentin	Moulin de St Clémentin #1	Moulin Tour		Moulins-a-Vent (in French)	
Saint-Clémentin	Moulin de St Clémentin #2	Moulin Tour		Moulins-a-Vent (in French)	
Saint-Clémentin	Moulin de St Clémentin #3	Moulin Tour		Moulins-a-Vent (in French)	
Saint-Cyprien	Moulin de Bellevue	Moulin Tour		Moulins-a-Vent (in French)	
Saint-Cyprien	Moulin Blanc	Moulin Tour		Moulins-a-Vent (in French)	
Saint-Généroux	Moulin de St Généroux	Moulin Tour		Moulins-a-Vent (in French)	
Saint-Germain-de-Longue-Chaume	Moulin de St Germain de Longue Chaume	Moulin Tour		Moulins-a-Vent (in French)	
Saint-Hilaire-la-Palud	Moulin de la Justice	Moulin Tour		Moulins-a-Vent (in French)	
Saint-Hilaire-la-Palud	Moulin de St Hilaire la Palud #1	Moulin Tour		Moulins-a-Vent (in French)	
Saint-Hilaire-la-Palud	Moulin de St Hilaire la Palud #2	Moulin Tour		Moulins-a-Vent (in French)	
Saint-Jouin-de-Marnes	Moulin de la Garenne	Moulin Tour		Moulins-a-Vent (in French)	
Saint-Loup-sur-Thouet	Moulin de St Loup sur Thouet#1	Moulin Tour		Moulins-a-Vent (in French)	
Saint-Loup-sur-Thouet	Moulin de St Loup sur Thouet #2	Moulin Tour		Moulins-a-Vent (in French)	
Saint-Loup-sur-Thouet	Moulin de St Loup sur Thouet #3	Moulin Tour		Moulins-a-Vent (in French)	
Saint-Loup-sur-Thouet	Moulin de St Loup sur Thouet #4	Moulin Tour		Moulins-a-Vent (in French)	
Saint-Varent	Moulin de Riblaire	Moulin Tour		Moulins-a-Vent (in French)	
Saint-Varent	Moulin de St Varent #1	Moulin Tour		Moulins-a-Vent (in French)	
Saint-Varent	Moulin de St Varent #2	Moulin Tour		Moulins-a-Vent (in French)	
Saint-Varent	Moulin de St Varent #3	Moulin Tour		Moulins-a-Vent (in French)	
Sainte-Gemme	Moulin de la Butte	Moulin Tour		Moulins-a-Vent (in French)	
Sainte-Radegonde-des-Pommiers	Moulin de Vrines	Moulin Tour	18th century	Moulins-a-Vent (in French)	
Usseau	Moulin des Joyeaux	Moulin Tour		Moulins-a-Vent (in French)	
Veluché	Moulin de Veluché #1	Moulin Tour		Moulins-a-Vent (in French)	
Veluché	Moulin de Veluché #2	Moulin Tour		Moulins-a-Vent (in French)	
Vernoux-en-Gâtine	Moulin a Vernoux en Gâtine	Moulin Tour		Moulins-a-Vent (in French)	
