= Massais =

- Part of Val en Vignes
- Location of Massais
- Location within France Location within Nouvelle-Aquitaine
- Coordinates: 47°00′25″N 0°20′31″W
- Country: France
- Region: Nouvelle-Aquitaine
- Department: Deux-Sèvres
- Arrondissement: Bressuire
- Canton: Le Val de Thouet
- Commune: Val en Vignes
- Area^{1}: 21.14 km^{2} (8.16 sq mi)
- Elevation: 92 m (302 ft)
- Highest elevation: 121 m (397 ft)
- Lowest elevation: 53 m (174 ft)
- Population (2022): 602
  - Density: 28.5/km^{2} (73.8/sq mi)
- Time zone: UTC+01:00 (CET)
  - Summer (DST): UTC+02:00 (CEST)
- Postal code: 79150
- ^{1} French Land Register data, which excludes lakes, ponds, glaciers > 1 km^{2} (0.386 sq mi or 247 acres) and river estuaries.

Massais (French pronunciation: [masɛ]) is a former commune in the Deux-Sèvres department in western France. On 1 January 2017, it was merged into the new commune Val en Vignes.

== See also ==
- Communes of the Deux-Sèvres department
