= Bouillé-Saint-Paul =

- Part of Val en Vignes
- Location of Bouillé-Saint-Paul
- Location within France Location within Nouvelle-Aquitaine
- Coordinates: 47°01′34″N 0°20′42″W
- Country: France
- Region: Nouvelle-Aquitaine
- Department: Deux-Sèvres
- Arrondissement: Bressuire
- Canton: Le Val de Thouet
- Commune: Val en Vignes
- Area^{1}: 20.38 km^{2} (7.87 sq mi)
- Elevation: 104 m (341 ft)
- Highest elevation: 107 m (351 ft)
- Lowest elevation: 47 m (154 ft)
- Population (2022): 378
  - Density: 18.5/km^{2} (48.0/sq mi)
- Time zone: UTC+01:00 (CET)
  - Summer (DST): UTC+02:00 (CEST)
- Postal code: 79290
- ^{1} French Land Register data, which excludes lakes, ponds, glaciers > 1 km^{2} (0.386 sq mi or 247 acres) and river estuaries.

Bouillé-Saint-Paul (French pronunciation: [buje sɛ̃ pɔl]) is a former commune in the Deux-Sèvres department in the Nouvelle-Aquitaine region in western France. On 1 January 2017, it was merged into the new commune Val en Vignes.

== See also ==
- Communes of the Deux-Sèvres department
