= Cersay =

- Part of Val en Vignes
- Coat of arms
- Location of Cersay
- Location within France Location within Nouvelle-Aquitaine
- Coordinates: 47°02′50″N 0°21′10″W
- Country: France
- Region: Nouvelle-Aquitaine
- Department: Deux-Sèvres
- Arrondissement: Bressuire
- Canton: Le Val de Thouet
- Commune: Val en Vignes
- Area^{1}: 36.78 km^{2} (14.20 sq mi)
- Elevation: 91 m (299 ft)
- Highest elevation: 112 m (367 ft)
- Lowest elevation: 59 m (194 ft)
- Population (2022): 1,043
  - Density: 28.36/km^{2} (73.45/sq mi)
- Time zone: UTC+01:00 (CET)
  - Summer (DST): UTC+02:00 (CEST)
- Postal code: 79290
- ^{1} French Land Register data, which excludes lakes, ponds, glaciers > 1 km^{2} (0.386 sq mi or 247 acres) and river estuaries.

Cersay (French pronunciation: [sɛʁsɛ]) is a former commune in the Deux-Sèvres department in the Nouvelle-Aquitaine region in western France. In January 1973 it absorbed the former commune Saint-Pierre-à-Champ. On 1 January 2017, it was merged into the new commune Val en Vignes.

== See also ==
- Communes of the Deux-Sèvres department
