= Voultegon =

- Part of Voulmentin
- Location of Voultegon
- Location within France Location within Nouvelle-Aquitaine
- Coordinates: 46°55′56″N 0°31′01″W
- Country: France
- Region: Nouvelle-Aquitaine
- Department: Deux-Sèvres
- Arrondissement: Bressuire
- Canton: Mauléon
- Commune: Voulmentin
- Area^{1}: 17.41 km^{2} (6.72 sq mi)
- Elevation: 124 m (407 ft)
- Highest elevation: 176 m (577 ft)
- Lowest elevation: 94 m (308 ft)
- Population (2017): 593
  - Density: 34.1/km^{2} (88.2/sq mi)
- Time zone: UTC+01:00 (CET)
  - Summer (DST): UTC+02:00 (CEST)
- Postal code: 79150
- ^{1} French Land Register data, which excludes lakes, ponds, glaciers > 1 km^{2} (0.386 sq mi or 247 acres) and river estuaries.

Voultegon (French pronunciation: [vultəɡɔ̃]) is a former commune in the Deux-Sèvres department in Poitou-Charentes region in western France.

On 1 January 2013, Voultegon and Saint-Clémentin merged becoming one commune called Voulmentin.
