= Toarcien National Nature Reserve =

Regional nature reserve and fossil site in Nouvelle-Aquitaine, France

- IUCN category III (natural monument or feature)
- Interactive map of Toarcien National Nature Reserve
- Location: Deux-Sèvres, France
- Nearest city: Sainte-Verge
- Coordinates: 47.0025°N 0.243°W
- Area: 061 ha (150 acres)
- Established: 23 November 1987
- Governing body: Communauté de communes du Thouarsais

Toarcien National Nature Reserve
- Stratigraphic range: Pliensbachian–Aalenian
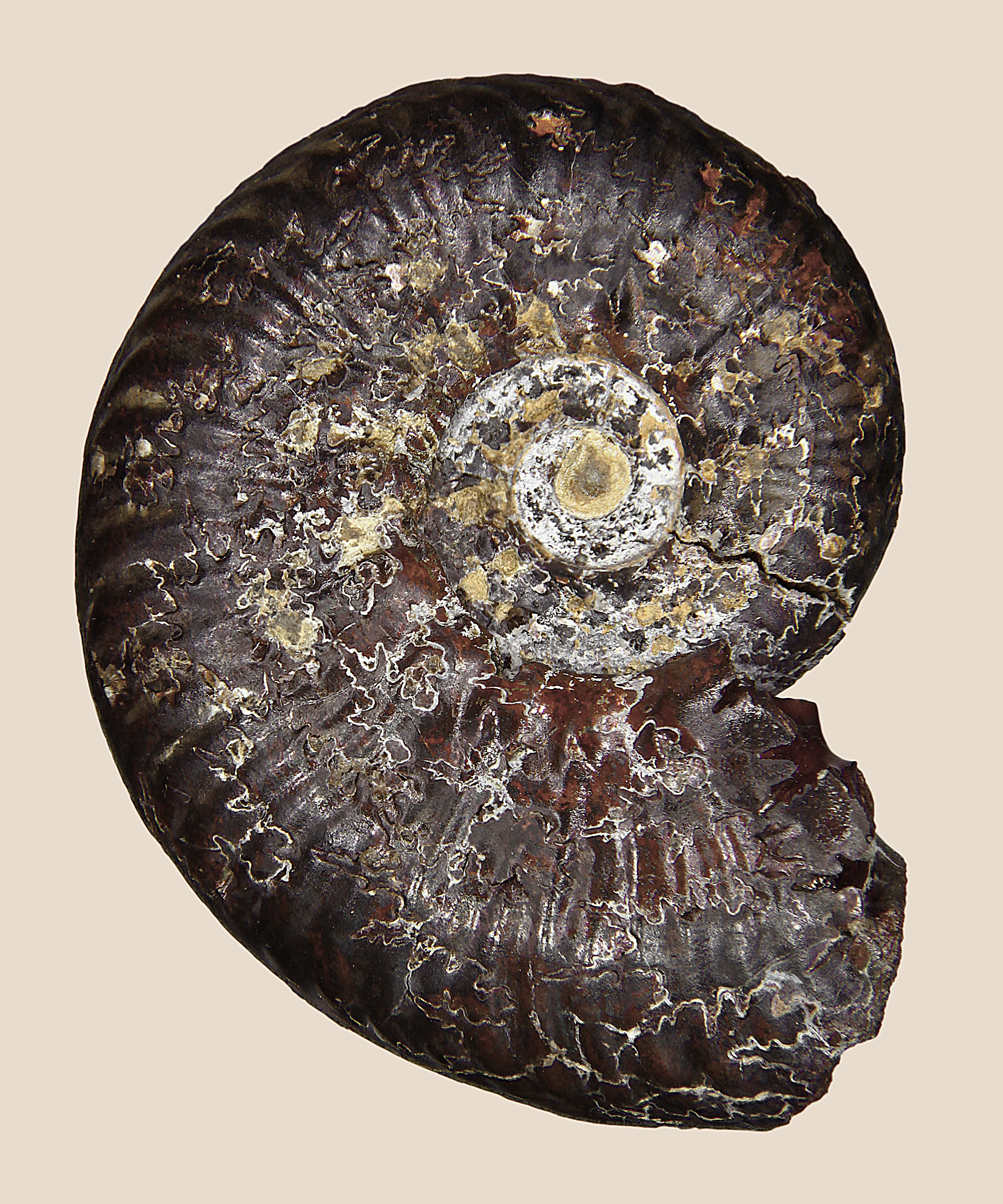
- Haugia variabilis, an ammonite from the Toarcian of France.
- Type: Geological formation
- Thickness: 7.6 m (25 ft)

Lithology
- Primary: Limestone
- Other: Marl and sandstone

Location
- Coordinates: 47.0025°N 0.243°W
- Region: Nouvelle-Aquitaine
- Country: France

Type section
- Named for: Thouars
- Toarcien National Nature Reserve (France)

The Toarcien National Nature Reserve (RNN91) is a French national nature reserve located in Nouvelle-Aquitaine, near the city of Thouars, from which the name Toarcian is derived. Established in 1987, it occupies an area of 0.61 hectares, making it the smallest national nature reserve in France. It protects two former quarries preserving the stratotype of the Toarcian stage.

== Location ==
The nature reserve domain is in the Deux-Sèvres department, near the commune of Sainte-Verge. It consists of two former open-air quarries separated by a few hundred meters in the Thouet valley. The first is located in the location "Les Groies", and the second approximately 500 meters south, in the location "Les Hauts-Côteaux". It bears the stratotype of the Toarcian, the latest stage of the Early Jurassic.

Its total area spreads overs 0.61 hectares (or 6 100 m^{2}), making it the smallest national nature reserve in France. There is, however, several smaller regional nature reserves.

== Ecology ==
The ammonite species having evolved quite rapidly, they are used as a geological marker for the terrains that bears them. The Toarcian stage is divided in 34 elementary units or "horizons". Each horizon correspond to a period of approximately 260 000 years, and is characterized by one or several specific ammonite species.

=== Geology ===
The Hauts-Côteaux quarry presents a cross-section significantly more developed than the Groies quarry. It bears, from bottom to top :

- ferruginous sandstone and gravelly limestone (> 0.50 m). It includes few fossils, notably bivalves (Pectinidae), gastropods and belemnites, and shows very numerous worm borrows;
- bioclastic limestone with ferruginous oolites (1.20 m). It is extremely rich in bioclasts (essentially fragmentary shells of bivalves and gastropods) and ferruginous oolites, small spheres made of thin concentric layers of iron oxide. Ammonites and belemnites can also be found. Those are dated from the Early and Middle Toarcian;
- argillaceous limestone alternating with marl (6.90 m). It contains also numerous fossils of pelagic organisms, mostly animals who lived in open waters (ammonites, nautilus, belemnites...). It spreads from the late Middle Toarcian to the Early Aalenian.

=== Tools and legal status ===
The nature reserve was established by decree the 23 November 1987. Articles 5 to 11 of the decree regulate the reserve and specify several restrictions. Article 5 indicates that "it is forbidden to harm in any way the coal front, the mineral substance or fossils from the reserve."
