= Availles =

Availles may refer to several communes in France:

- Availles-en-Châtellerault, in the Vienne department
- Availles-Limouzine, in the Vienne department
- Availles-sur-Seiche, in the Ille-et-Vilaine department
- Availles-Thouarsais, in the Deux-Sèvres department
