= Louin =

Louin may refer to:

- Louin, Deux-Sèvres, France
- Louin, Mississippi, United States
