= Pierrefitte, Deux-Sèvres =

Pierrefitte
- Commune
- Location of Pierrefitte
- Location within France Location within Nouvelle-Aquitaine
- Coordinates: 46°52′10″N 0°18′02″W
- Country: France
- Region: Nouvelle-Aquitaine
- Department: Deux-Sèvres
- Arrondissement: Bressuire
- Canton: Le Val de Thouet

Government
  - Mayor (2020–2026): Marc Vauzelle
- Area^{1}: 15.91 km^{2} (6.14 sq mi)
- Elevation: 115 m (377 ft)
- Highest elevation: 168 m (551 ft)
- Lowest elevation: 110 m (360 ft)
- Population (2023): 318
  - Density: 20.0/km^{2} (51.8/sq mi)
- Time zone: UTC+01:00 (CET)
  - Summer (DST): UTC+02:00 (CEST)
- INSEE/Postal code: 79209 /79330
- ^{1} French Land Register data, which excludes lakes, ponds, glaciers > 1 km^{2} (0.386 sq mi or 247 acres) and river estuaries.

Pierrefitte (French pronunciation: [pjɛʁfit]) is a commune in the Deux-Sèvres department in western France.

== See also ==
- Communes of the Deux-Sèvres department
