= Canton of Thouars =

Coordinates: 46.98°N 0.21°W

The canton of Thouars is an administrative division of the Deux-Sèvres department, western France. It was created at the French canton reorganisation which came into effect in March 2015. Its seat is in Thouars.

It consists of the following communes:

1. Louzy
2. Sainte-Verge
3. Saint-Jacques-de-Thouars
4. Saint-Jean-de-Thouars
5. Thouars
