= Faye-l'Abbesse =

- Commune
- Location of Faye-l'Abbesse
- Location within France Location within Nouvelle-Aquitaine
- Coordinates: 46°49′51″N 0°21′10″W
- Country: France
- Region: Nouvelle-Aquitaine
- Department: Deux-Sèvres
- Arrondissement: Bressuire
- Canton: Bressuire
- Intercommunality: CA Bocage Bressuirais

Government
  - Mayor (2020–2026): Gérard Pierre
- Area^{1}: 23.27 km^{2} (8.98 sq mi)
- Elevation: 173 m (568 ft)
- Highest elevation: 179 m (587 ft)
- Lowest elevation: 90 m (300 ft)
- Population (2023): 1,131
  - Density: 48.60/km^{2} (125.9/sq mi)
- Time zone: UTC+01:00 (CET)
  - Summer (DST): UTC+02:00 (CEST)
- INSEE/Postal code: 79116 /79350
- ^{1} French Land Register data, which excludes lakes, ponds, glaciers > 1 km^{2} (0.386 sq mi or 247 acres) and river estuaries.

Faye-l'Abbesse (French pronunciation: [fɛ labɛs]) is a commune in the Deux-Sèvres department in the Nouvelle-Aquitaine region in western France.

== See also ==
- Communes of the Deux-Sèvres department
