= Louzy =

- Commune
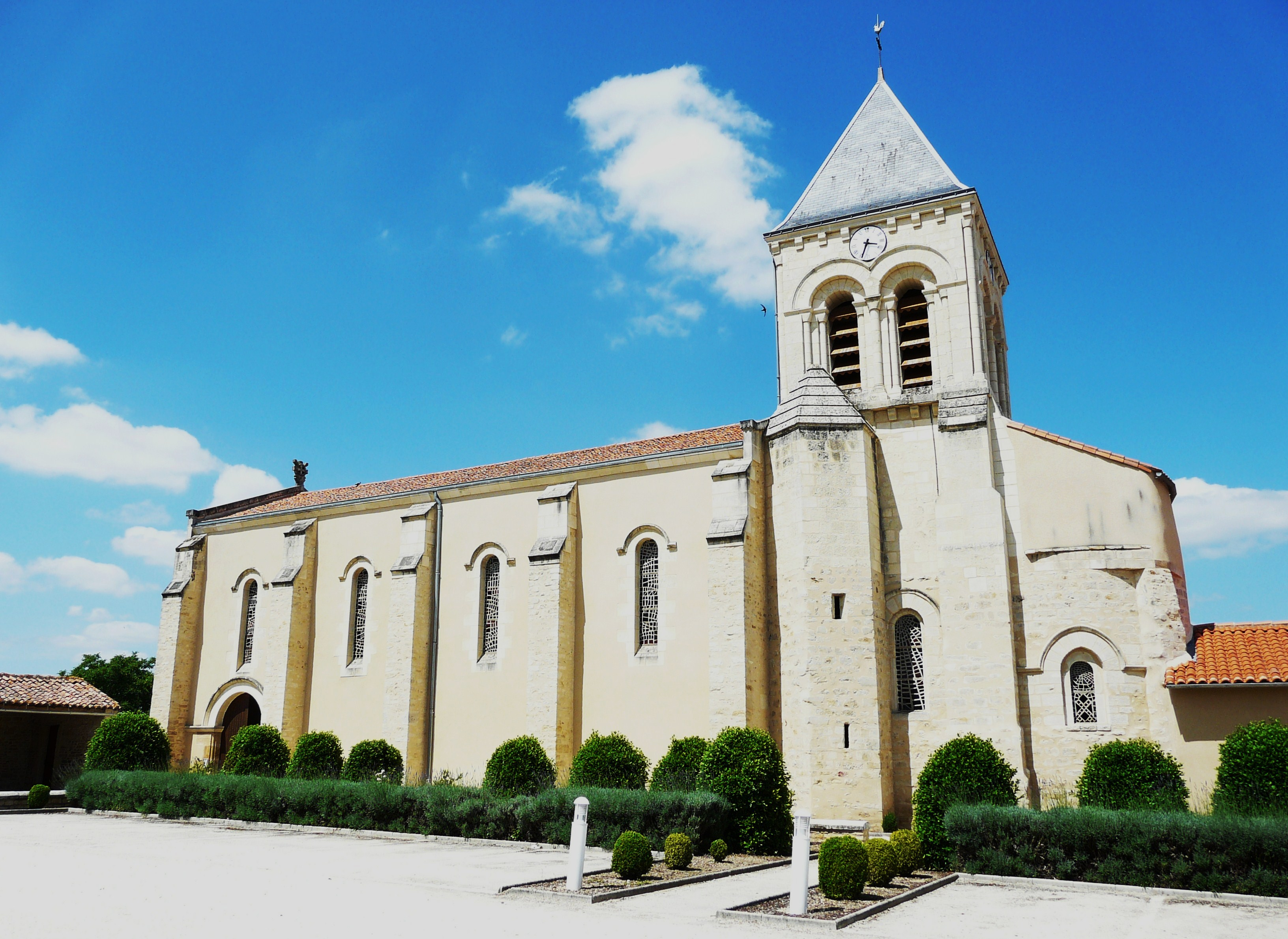
- The church in Louzy
- Location of Louzy
- Location within France Location within Nouvelle-Aquitaine
- Coordinates: 47°00′48″N 0°11′02″W
- Country: France
- Region: Nouvelle-Aquitaine
- Department: Deux-Sèvres
- Arrondissement: Bressuire
- Canton: Thouars
- Intercommunality: Thouarsais

Government
  - Mayor (2020–2026): Michel Doret
- Area^{1}: 18.64 km^{2} (7.20 sq mi)
- Elevation: 59 m (194 ft)
- Highest elevation: 81 m (266 ft)
- Lowest elevation: 42 m (138 ft)
- Population (2023): 1,288
  - Density: 69.10/km^{2} (179.0/sq mi)
- Time zone: UTC+01:00 (CET)
  - Summer (DST): UTC+02:00 (CEST)
- INSEE/Postal code: 79157 /79100
- ^{1} French Land Register data, which excludes lakes, ponds, glaciers > 1 km^{2} (0.386 sq mi or 247 acres) and river estuaries.

Louzy (French pronunciation: [luzi]) is a commune in the Deux-Sèvres department in western France.

== See also ==
- Communes of the Deux-Sèvres department
