= Irais =

- Commune
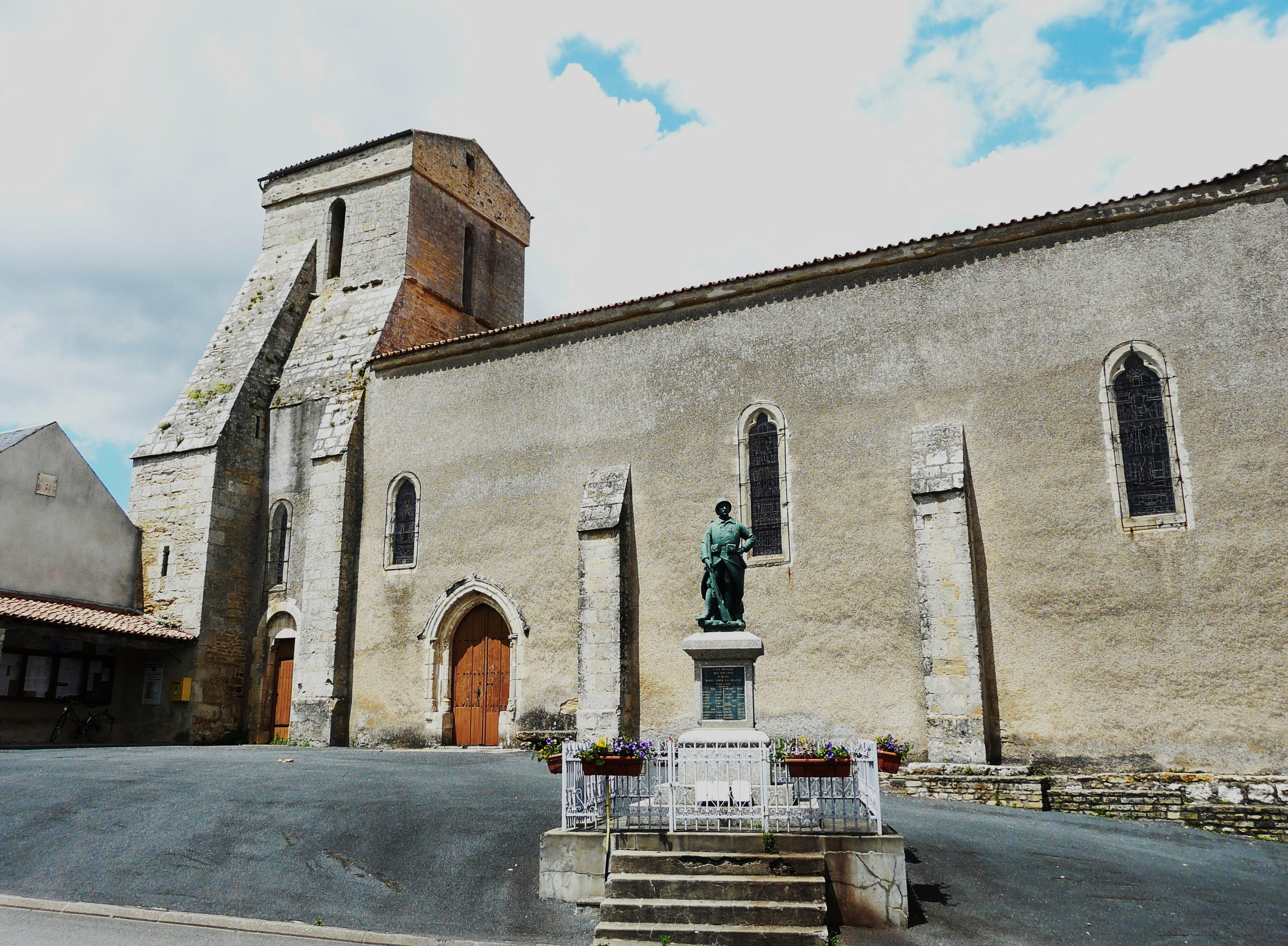
- The war memorial and the church in Irais
- Location of Irais
- Location within France Location within Nouvelle-Aquitaine
- Coordinates: 46°52′48″N 0°05′30″W
- Country: France
- Region: Nouvelle-Aquitaine
- Department: Deux-Sèvres
- Arrondissement: Parthenay
- Canton: Le Val de Thouet
- Intercommunality: Airvaudais-Val du Thouet

Government
  - Mayor (2020–2026): Hélène Marsault
- Area^{1}: 13.50 km^{2} (5.21 sq mi)
- Elevation: 100 m (330 ft)
- Highest elevation: 137 m (449 ft)
- Lowest elevation: 74 m (243 ft)
- Population (2023): 209
  - Density: 15.5/km^{2} (40.1/sq mi)
- Time zone: UTC+01:00 (CET)
  - Summer (DST): UTC+02:00 (CEST)
- INSEE/Postal code: 79141 /79600
- ^{1} French Land Register data, which excludes lakes, ponds, glaciers > 1 km^{2} (0.386 sq mi or 247 acres) and river estuaries.

Irais (French pronunciation: [iʁɛ]) is a commune in the Deux-Sèvres department in western France.

== See also ==
- Communes of the Deux-Sèvres department
