= Saint-Jacques-de-Thouars =

- Commune
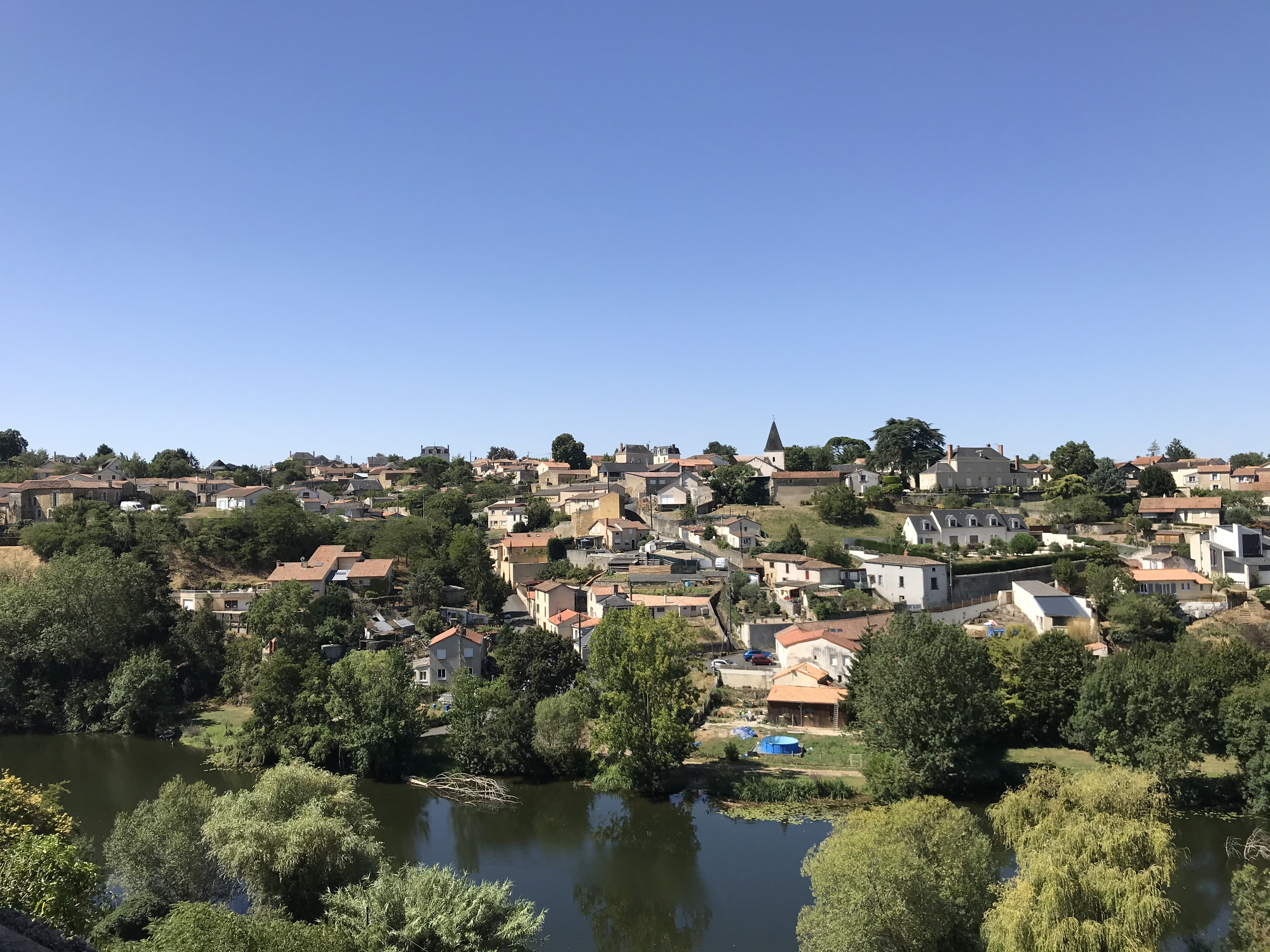
- A general view of Saint-Jacques-de-Thouars
- Location of Saint-Jacques-de-Thouars
- Location within France Location within Nouvelle-Aquitaine
- Coordinates: 46°58′11″N 0°13′13″W
- Country: France
- Region: Nouvelle-Aquitaine
- Department: Deux-Sèvres
- Arrondissement: Bressuire
- Canton: Thouars
- Intercommunality: Thouarsais

Government
  - Mayor (2020–2026): Sylvain Sintive
- Area^{1}: 5.55 km^{2} (2.14 sq mi)
- Elevation: 100 m (330 ft)
- Highest elevation: 108 m (354 ft)
- Lowest elevation: 47 m (154 ft)
- Population (2023): 421
  - Density: 75.9/km^{2} (196/sq mi)
- Time zone: UTC+01:00 (CET)
  - Summer (DST): UTC+02:00 (CEST)
- INSEE/Postal code: 79258 /79100
- ^{1} French Land Register data, which excludes lakes, ponds, glaciers > 1 km^{2} (0.386 sq mi or 247 acres) and river estuaries.

Saint-Jacques-de-Thouars (French pronunciation: [sɛ̃ ʒak də twaʁ], literally Saint-Jacques of Thouars) is a commune in the Deux-Sèvres department in western France.

== See also ==
- Communes of the Deux-Sèvres department
