= Marnes, Deux-Sèvres =

Marnes
- Commune
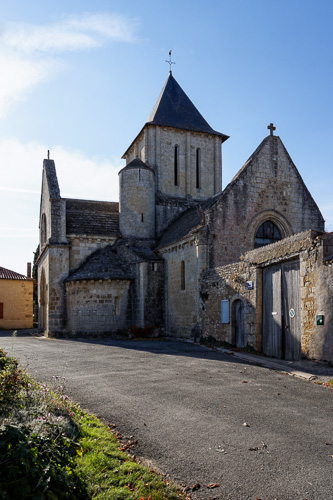
- The church of Saint-Jean, in Marnes
- Location of Marnes
- Location within France Location within Nouvelle-Aquitaine
- Coordinates: 46°51′26″N 0°01′05″W
- Country: France
- Region: Nouvelle-Aquitaine
- Department: Deux-Sèvres
- Arrondissement: Bressuire
- Canton: Le Val de Thouet

Government
  - Mayor (2024–2026): Germain Girouard
- Area^{1}: 17.19 km^{2} (6.64 sq mi)
- Elevation: 101 m (331 ft)
- Highest elevation: 110 m (360 ft)
- Lowest elevation: 58 m (190 ft)
- Population (2023): 217
  - Density: 12.6/km^{2} (32.7/sq mi)
- Time zone: UTC+01:00 (CET)
  - Summer (DST): UTC+02:00 (CEST)
- INSEE/Postal code: 79167 /79600
- ^{1} French Land Register data, which excludes lakes, ponds, glaciers > 1 km^{2} (0.386 sq mi or 247 acres) and river estuaries.

Marnes (French pronunciation: [maʁn]) is a commune in the Deux-Sèvres department in western France.

== See also ==
- Communes of the Deux-Sèvres department
