= Coulonges-Thouarsais =

- Commune
- Location of Coulonges-Thouarsais
- Location within France Location within Nouvelle-Aquitaine
- Coordinates: 46°55′33″N 0°19′12″W
- Country: France
- Region: Nouvelle-Aquitaine
- Department: Deux-Sèvres
- Arrondissement: Bressuire
- Canton: Le Val de Thouet

Government
  - Mayor (2020–2026): Sébastien Rochard
- Area^{1}: 17.26 km^{2} (6.66 sq mi)
- Elevation: 91 m (299 ft)
- Highest elevation: 172 m (564 ft)
- Lowest elevation: 99 m (325 ft)
- Population (2023): 443
  - Density: 25.7/km^{2} (66.5/sq mi)
- Time zone: UTC+01:00 (CET)
  - Summer (DST): UTC+02:00 (CEST)
- INSEE/Postal code: 79102 /79330
- ^{1} French Land Register data, which excludes lakes, ponds, glaciers > 1 km^{2} (0.386 sq mi or 247 acres) and river estuaries.

Coulonges-Thouarsais (French pronunciation: [kulɔ̃ʒ twaʁsɛ]) is a commune in the Deux-Sèvres department in the Nouvelle-Aquitaine region in western France.

== See also ==
- Communes of the Deux-Sèvres department
