= National nature reserve (France) =

A national nature reserve, in French réserve naturelle nationale, (RNN) is a protected area that is part of natural reserves of France (RNF) and whose status is defined by the law on local democracy of February 27, 2002. It is a tool for the long-term protection of spaces, species or geological objects. The duration of its protection is unlimited.

== History ==
In 1912, the first French nature reserve was created in Sept-Îles archipelago as a private ornithological reserve. It will be classified in 1976. In 1961, the first RNN created is Lake Luitel in Isère.

== Legislation ==
The Law n° 57-740 of July 1, 1957 amended the Law of May 2, 1930 by adding an article 8 bis allowing the classification of a site as a "nature reserve". It allowed the subsequent creation of national nature reserves by Law n ° 76-629 of July 10, 1976 relating to protection of nature. Afterwards, the law on local democracy of February 27, 2002 redefined their status by distinguishing between:

- national nature reserves
- regional nature reserves
- natural reserves of Corsica

National nature reserves are classified by ministerial decree or by decree in the Council of State.

== Inventory ==
As of February 1, 2020, there are 167 national nature reserves covering 67,681,656 ha distributed in:

- 151 RNN in mainland France
- 16 RNN in overseas territories

The smallest RNNs are Toarcien with 0.61 ha and Gravelle Cave with 1.37 ha

The largest are French Southern Territories with 67,200,000 ha, Nouragues with 100,000 ha, Kaw-Roura Marshes with 94,700 ha, La Trinité with 76,000 ha and High Plateaus of Vercors with 17,030 ha (the largest in mainland France).
