= Val en Vignes =

- Commune
- Location of Val en Vignes
- Location within France Location within Nouvelle-Aquitaine
- Coordinates: 47°02′49″N 0°21′11″W
- Country: France
- Region: Nouvelle-Aquitaine
- Department: Deux-Sèvres
- Arrondissement: Bressuire
- Canton: Le Val de Thouet
- Intercommunality: Thouarsais

Government
  - Mayor (2020–2026): Christophe Guillot
- Area^{1}: 78.30 km^{2} (30.23 sq mi)
- Population (2023): 2,020
  - Density: 25.8/km^{2} (66.8/sq mi)
- Time zone: UTC+01:00 (CET)
  - Summer (DST): UTC+02:00 (CEST)
- INSEE/Postal code: 79063 /79150, 79290
- ^{1} French Land Register data, which excludes lakes, ponds, glaciers > 1 km^{2} (0.386 sq mi or 247 acres) and river estuaries.

Val en Vignes (French pronunciation: [val ɑ̃ viɲ]) is a commune in the department of Deux-Sèvres, western France. The municipality was established on 1 January 2017 by merger of the former communes of Cersay (the seat), Bouillé-Saint-Paul and Massais.

== Population ==
Population data refer to the area corresponding with the commune as of January 2025.

Historical population
Year	Pop.	±% p.a.
1968	2,474	—
1975	2,239	−1.42%
1982	2,181	−0.37%
1990	2,001	−1.07%
1999	1,883	−0.67%
2007	2,005	+0.79%
2012	2,035	+0.30%
2017	2,047	+0.12%
2023	2,020	−0.22%
Source: INSEE

== See also ==
- Communes of the Deux-Sèvres department
