= Luché-Thouarsais =

- Commune
- Location of Luché-Thouarsais
- Location within France Location within Nouvelle-Aquitaine
- Coordinates: 46°54′33″N 0°18′02″W
- Country: France
- Region: Nouvelle-Aquitaine
- Department: Deux-Sèvres
- Arrondissement: Bressuire
- Canton: Le Val de Thouet

Government
  - Mayor (2020–2026): Joële Pallueau
- Area^{1}: 13.46 km^{2} (5.20 sq mi)
- Elevation: 145 m (476 ft)
- Highest elevation: 159 m (522 ft)
- Lowest elevation: 101 m (331 ft)
- Population (2023): 536
  - Density: 39.8/km^{2} (103/sq mi)
- Time zone: UTC+01:00 (CET)
  - Summer (DST): UTC+02:00 (CEST)
- INSEE/Postal code: 79159 /79330
- ^{1} French Land Register data, which excludes lakes, ponds, glaciers > 1 km^{2} (0.386 sq mi or 247 acres) and river estuaries.

Luché-Thouarsais (French pronunciation: [lyʃe twaʁsɛ]) is a commune in the Deux-Sèvres department in western France.

== See also ==
- Communes of the Deux-Sèvres department
