= Maisontiers =

- Commune
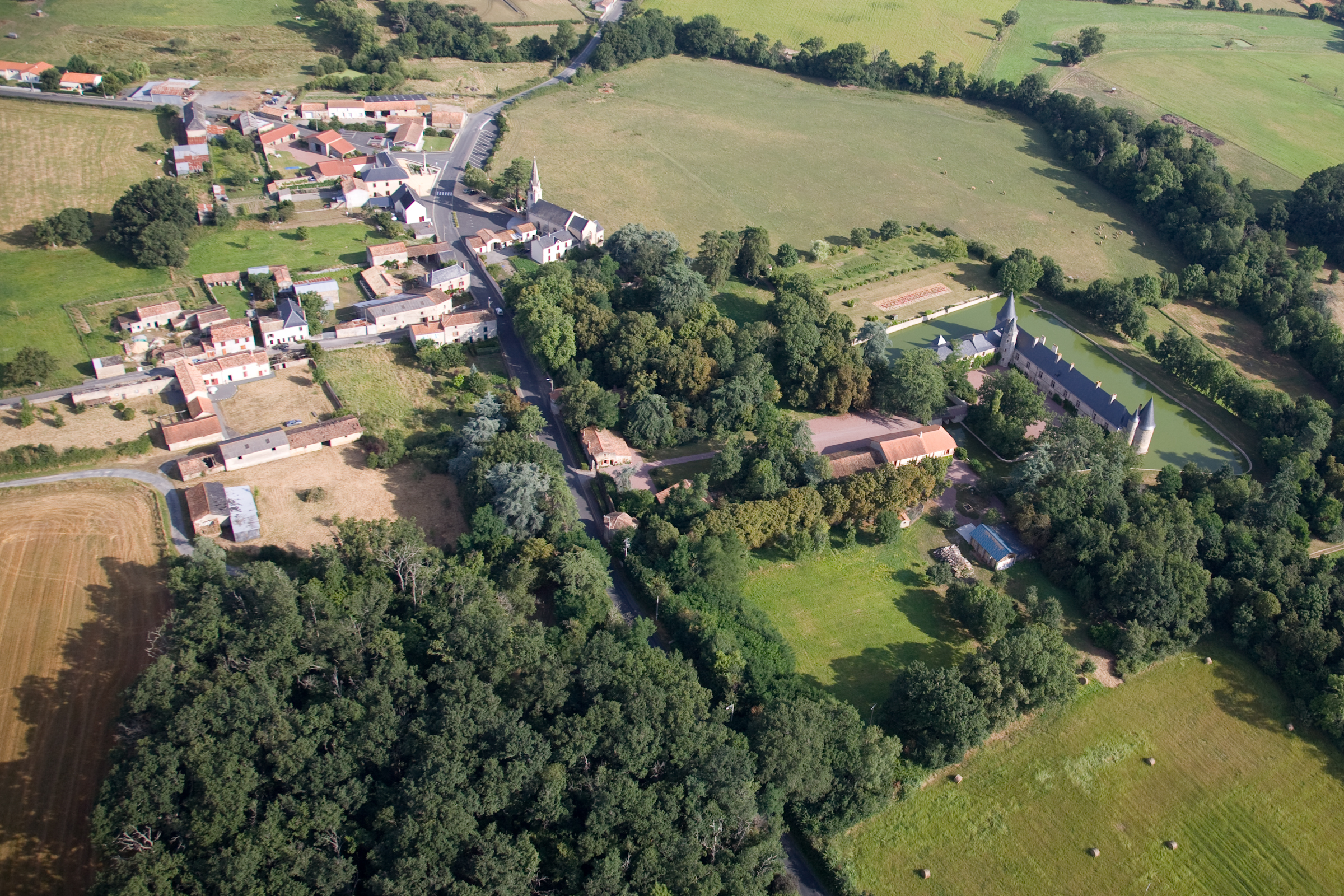
- An aerial view of Maisontiers
- Location of Maisontiers
- Location within France Location within Nouvelle-Aquitaine
- Coordinates: 46°46′40″N 0°14′52″W
- Country: France
- Region: Nouvelle-Aquitaine
- Department: Deux-Sèvres
- Arrondissement: Parthenay
- Canton: Le Val de Thouet
- Intercommunality: Airvaudais-Val du Thouet

Government
  - Mayor (2020–2026): Gérard Chabauty
- Area^{1}: 18.29 km^{2} (7.06 sq mi)
- Elevation: 80 m (260 ft)
- Highest elevation: 166 m (545 ft)
- Lowest elevation: 129 m (423 ft)
- Population (2023): 134
  - Density: 7.33/km^{2} (19.0/sq mi)
- Time zone: UTC+01:00 (CET)
  - Summer (DST): UTC+02:00 (CEST)
- INSEE/Postal code: 79165 /79600
- ^{1} French Land Register data, which excludes lakes, ponds, glaciers > 1 km^{2} (0.386 sq mi or 247 acres) and river estuaries.

Maisontiers (French pronunciation: [mɛzɔ̃tje]) is a commune in the Deux-Sèvres department in western France.

== See also ==
- Communes of the Deux-Sèvres department
