= Voulmentin =

- Commune
- Location of Voulmentin
- Location within France Location within Nouvelle-Aquitaine
- Coordinates: 46°55′56″N 0°31′01″W
- Country: France
- Region: Nouvelle-Aquitaine
- Department: Deux-Sèvres
- Arrondissement: Bressuire
- Canton: Mauléon
- Intercommunality: CA Bocage Bressuirais

Government
  - Mayor (2020–2026): Sophie Besnard
- Area^{1}: 31.23 km^{2} (12.06 sq mi)
- Elevation: 124 m (407 ft)
- Highest elevation: 176 m (577 ft)
- Lowest elevation: 87 m (285 ft)
- Population (2023): 1,129
  - Density: 36.15/km^{2} (93.63/sq mi)
- Time zone: UTC+01:00 (CET)
  - Summer (DST): UTC+02:00 (CEST)
- INSEE/Postal code: 79242 /79150
- ^{1} French Land Register data, which excludes lakes, ponds, glaciers > 1 km^{2} (0.386 sq mi or 247 acres) and river estuaries.

Voulmentin (French pronunciation: [vulmɑ̃tɛ̃]) is a commune in the Deux-Sèvres department in Nouvelle-Aquitaine region in western France. The result of the merger, on 1 January 2013, of the communes of Voultegon and Saint-Clémentin.

== See also ==
- Communes of the Deux-Sèvres department
