= Pas-de-Jeu =

- Commune
- Location of Pas-de-Jeu
- Location within France Location within Nouvelle-Aquitaine
- Coordinates: 46°58′33″N 0°02′29″W
- Country: France
- Region: Nouvelle-Aquitaine
- Department: Deux-Sèvres
- Arrondissement: Bressuire
- Canton: Le Val de Thouet

Government
  - Mayor (2020–2026): Maryline Gelée
- Area^{1}: 11.11 km^{2} (4.29 sq mi)
- Elevation: 60 m (200 ft)
- Highest elevation: 86 m (282 ft)
- Lowest elevation: 44 m (144 ft)
- Population (2023): 341
  - Density: 30.7/km^{2} (79.5/sq mi)
- Time zone: UTC+01:00 (CET)
  - Summer (DST): UTC+02:00 (CEST)
- INSEE/Postal code: 79203 /79100
- ^{1} French Land Register data, which excludes lakes, ponds, glaciers > 1 km^{2} (0.386 sq mi or 247 acres) and river estuaries.

Pas-de-Jeu is a commune in the Deux-Sèvres department in western France.

== See also ==
- Communes of the Deux-Sèvres department
