= Saint-Léger-de-Montbrun =

- Commune
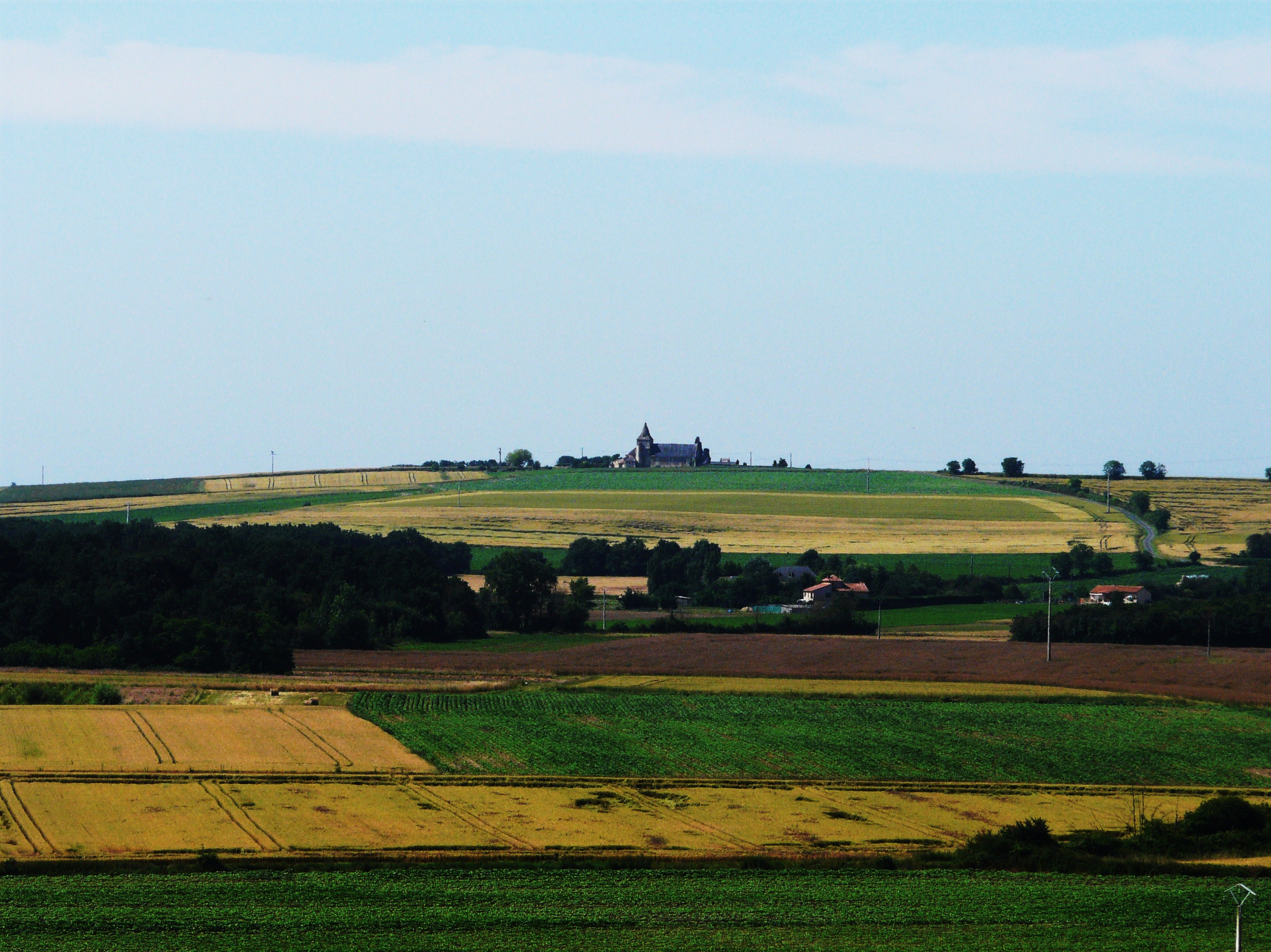
- A general view of Saint-Léger-de-Montbrun

- Coat of arms
- Location of Saint-Léger-de-Montbrun
- Location within France Location within Nouvelle-Aquitaine
- Coordinates: 46°59′32″N 0°06′59″W
- Country: France
- Region: Nouvelle-Aquitaine
- Department: Deux-Sèvres
- Arrondissement: Bressuire
- Canton: Le Val de Thouet
- Intercommunality: Thouarsais

Government
  - Mayor (2020–2026): Jean-Paul Montibert
- Area^{1}: 30.72 km^{2} (11.86 sq mi)
- Elevation: 77 m (253 ft)
- Highest elevation: 105 m (344 ft)
- Lowest elevation: 46 m (151 ft)
- Population (2023): 1,247
  - Density: 40.59/km^{2} (105.1/sq mi)
- Time zone: UTC+01:00 (CET)
  - Summer (DST): UTC+02:00 (CEST)
- INSEE/Postal code: 79265 /79100
- ^{1} French Land Register data, which excludes lakes, ponds, glaciers > 1 km^{2} (0.386 sq mi or 247 acres) and river estuaries.

Saint-Léger-de-Montbrun (French pronunciation: [sɛ̃ leʒe də mɔ̃bʁœ̃]) is a commune in the Deux-Sèvres department in western France.

== See also ==
- Communes of the Deux-Sèvres department
