= Saint-Martin-de-Sanzay =

- Commune
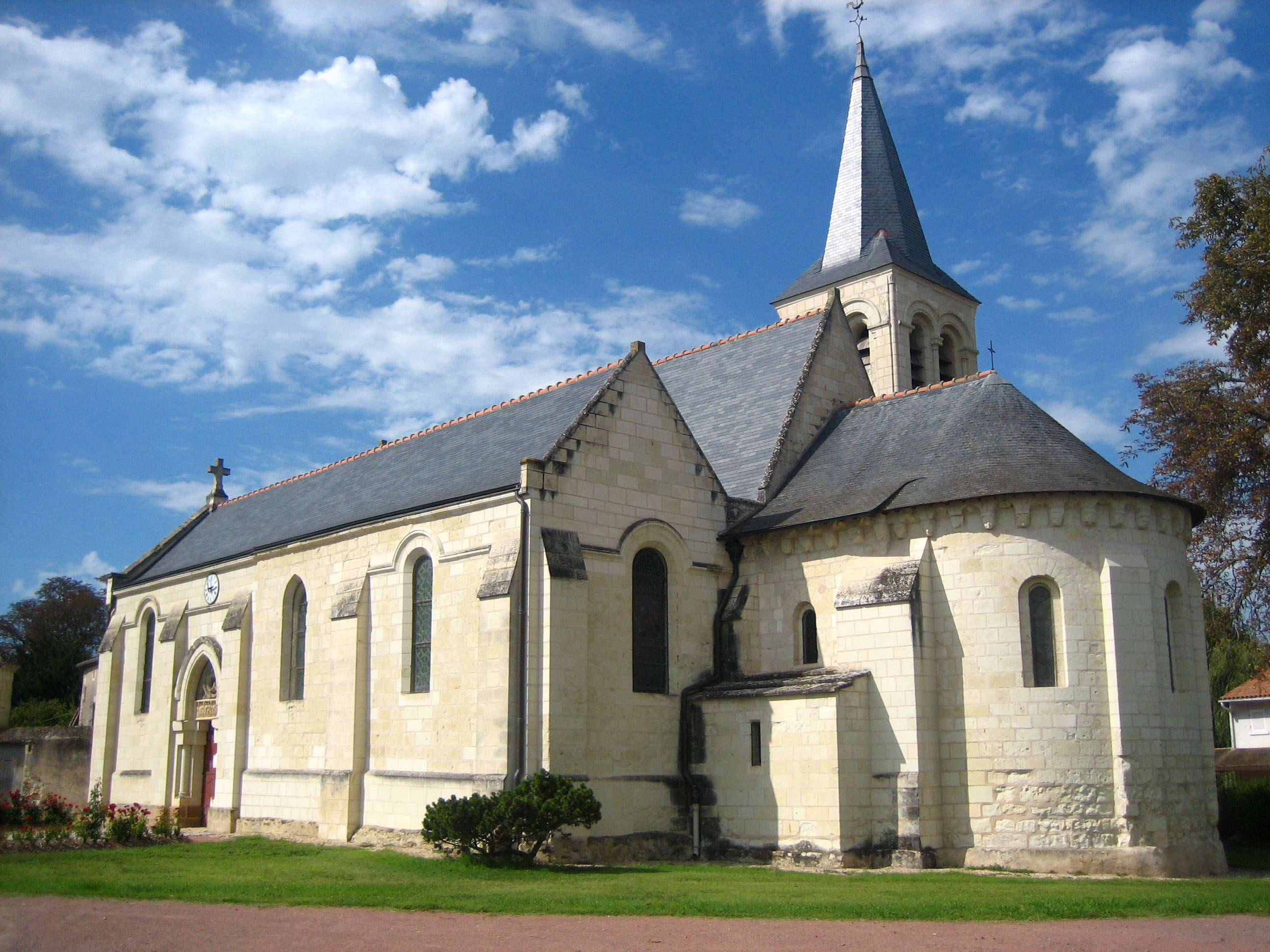
- The church in Saint-Martin-de-Sanzay

- Coat of arms
- Location of Saint-Martin-de-Sanzay
- Location within France Location within Nouvelle-Aquitaine
- Coordinates: 47°04′54″N 0°11′58″W
- Country: France
- Region: Nouvelle-Aquitaine
- Department: Deux-Sèvres
- Arrondissement: Bressuire
- Canton: Le Val de Thouet

Government
  - Mayor (2020–2026): Valérie Guidal
- Area^{1}: 24.69 km^{2} (9.53 sq mi)
- Elevation: 41 m (135 ft)
- Highest elevation: 73 m (240 ft)
- Lowest elevation: 32 m (105 ft)
- Population (2023): 1,030
  - Density: 41.7/km^{2} (108/sq mi)
- Time zone: UTC+01:00 (CET)
  - Summer (DST): UTC+02:00 (CEST)
- INSEE/Postal code: 79277 /79290
- ^{1} French Land Register data, which excludes lakes, ponds, glaciers > 1 km^{2} (0.386 sq mi or 247 acres) and river estuaries.

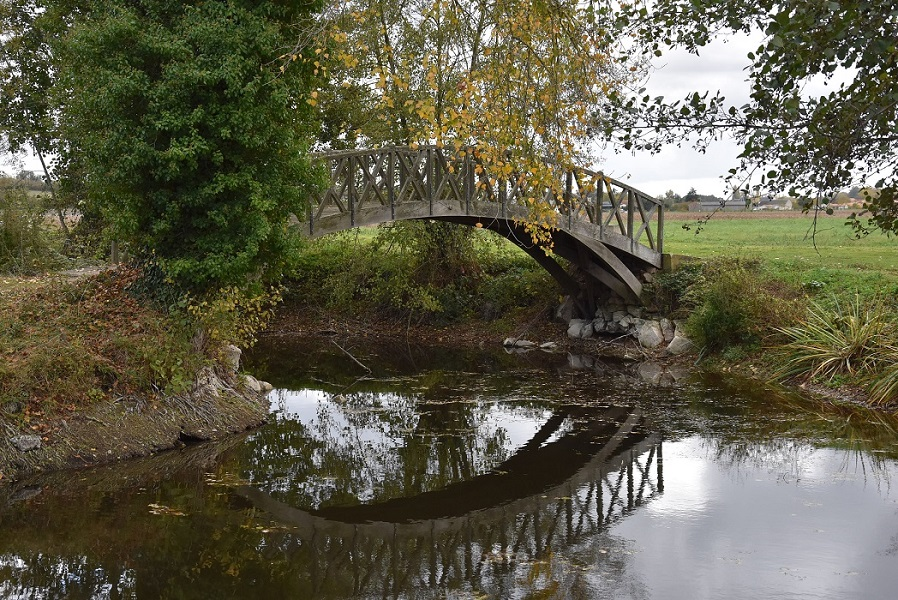
Footbridge, la Ballastière.

Saint-Martin-de-Sanzay (French pronunciation: [sɛ̃ maʁtɛ̃ də sɑ̃zɛ]) is a commune in the Deux-Sèvres department in western France. In January 1973 it absorbed the former commune Brion-près-Thouet.

== See also ==
- Communes of the Deux-Sèvres department
