= Brion-près-Thouet =

- Commune
- Location of Brion-près-Thouet
- Location within France Location within Nouvelle-Aquitaine
- Coordinates: 47°03′07″N 0°11′05″W
- Country: France
- Region: Nouvelle-Aquitaine
- Department: Deux-Sèvres
- Arrondissement: Bressuire
- Canton: Le Val de Thouet

Government
  - Mayor (2020–2026): Thierry Déchereux
- Area^{1}: 8.06 km^{2} (3.11 sq mi)
- Elevation: 41 m (135 ft)
- Highest elevation: 74 m (243 ft)
- Lowest elevation: 39 m (128 ft)
- Population (2023): 759
  - Density: 94.2/km^{2} (244/sq mi)
- Time zone: UTC+01:00 (CET)
  - Summer (DST): UTC+02:00 (CEST)
- INSEE/Postal code: 79056 /79290
- ^{1} French Land Register data, which excludes lakes, ponds, glaciers > 1 km^{2} (0.386 sq mi or 247 acres) and river estuaries.

Brion-près-Thouet is a commune in the Deux-Sèvres department in the Nouvelle-Aquitaine region in western France.

== See also ==
- Communes of the Deux-Sèvres department
