= Tourtenay =

- Commune
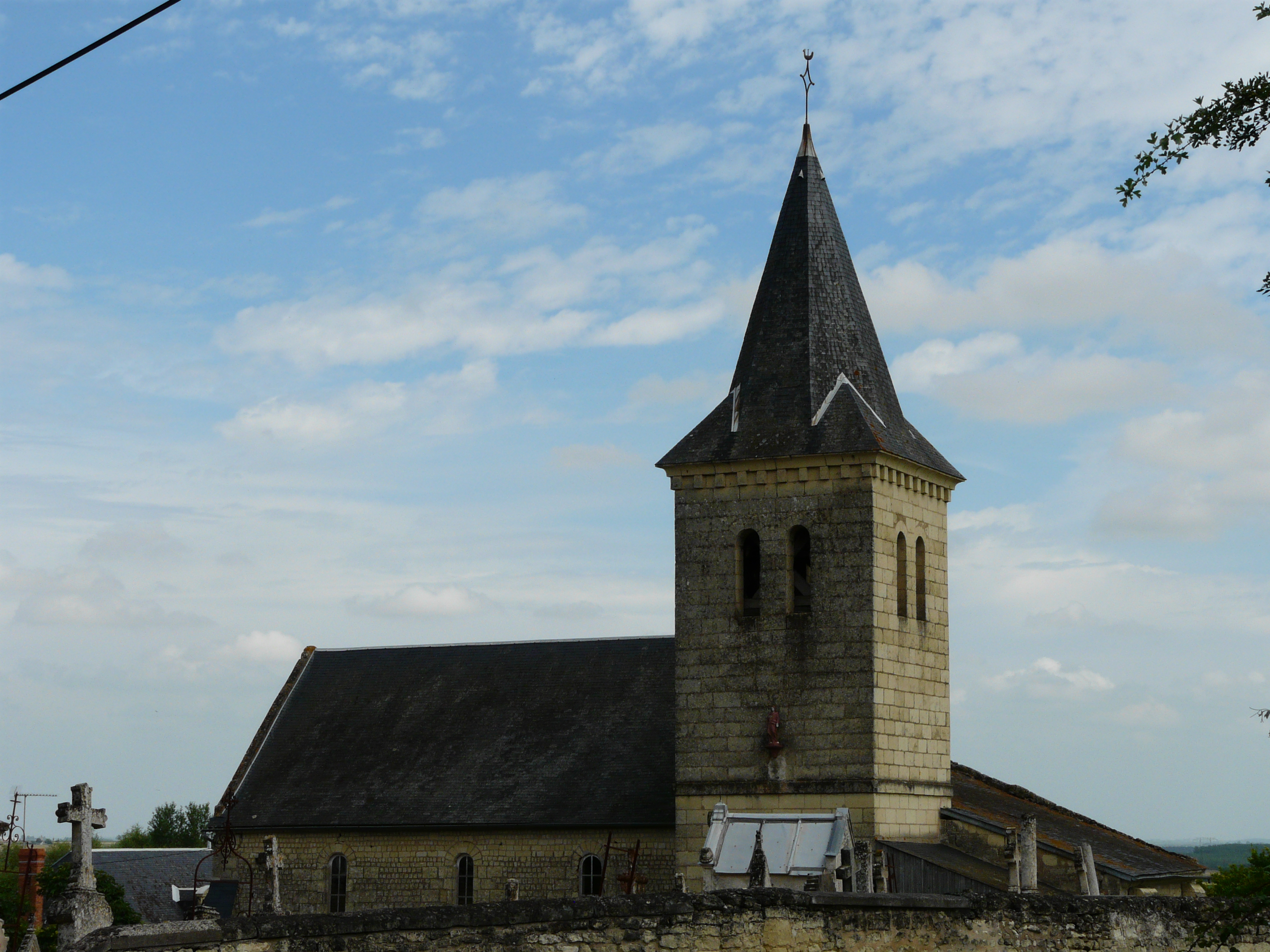
- The church in Tourtenay
- Location of Tourtenay
- Location within France Location within Nouvelle-Aquitaine
- Coordinates: 47°02′20″N 0°07′00″W
- Country: France
- Region: Nouvelle-Aquitaine
- Department: Deux-Sèvres
- Arrondissement: Bressuire
- Canton: Le Val de Thouet

Government
  - Mayor (2020–2026): Edwige Ardrit
- Area^{1}: 7.72 km^{2} (2.98 sq mi)
- Elevation: 116 m (381 ft)
- Highest elevation: 113 m (371 ft)
- Lowest elevation: 36 m (118 ft)
- Population (2023): 125
  - Density: 16.2/km^{2} (41.9/sq mi)
- Time zone: UTC+01:00 (CET)
  - Summer (DST): UTC+02:00 (CEST)
- INSEE/Postal code: 79331 /79100
- ^{1} French Land Register data, which excludes lakes, ponds, glaciers > 1 km^{2} (0.386 sq mi or 247 acres) and river estuaries.

Tourtenay (French pronunciation: [tuʁtənɛ]) is a commune in the Deux-Sèvres department in western France.

== See also ==
- Communes of the Deux-Sèvres department
