= Boismé =

- Commune
- Location of Boismé
- Location within France Location within Nouvelle-Aquitaine
- Coordinates: 46°46′32″N 0°26′02″W
- Country: France
- Region: Nouvelle-Aquitaine
- Department: Deux-Sèvres
- Arrondissement: Bressuire
- Canton: Bressuire
- Intercommunality: CA Bocage Bressuirais

Government
  - Mayor (2021–2026): Corinne Taillefait
- Area^{1}: 37.8 km^{2} (14.6 sq mi)
- Elevation: 166 m (545 ft)
- Highest elevation: 227 m (745 ft)
- Lowest elevation: 127 m (417 ft)
- Population (2023): 1,176
  - Density: 31.1/km^{2} (80.6/sq mi)
- Time zone: UTC+01:00 (CET)
  - Summer (DST): UTC+02:00 (CEST)
- INSEE/Postal code: 79038 /79300
- ^{1} French Land Register data, which excludes lakes, ponds, glaciers > 1 km^{2} (0.386 sq mi or 247 acres) and river estuaries.

Boismé (French pronunciation: [bwame]) is a commune in the Deux-Sèvres department in the Nouvelle-Aquitaine region in western France.

== See also ==
- Communes of the Deux-Sèvres department
