= Saint-Clémentin =

- Part of Voulmentin
- Location of Saint-Clémentin
- Location within France Location within Nouvelle-Aquitaine
- Coordinates: 46°56′44″N 0°30′52″W
- Country: France
- Region: Nouvelle-Aquitaine
- Department: Deux-Sèvres
- Arrondissement: Bressuire
- Canton: Mauléon
- Commune: Voulmentin
- Area^{1}: 13.82 km^{2} (5.34 sq mi)
- Elevation: 110 m (360 ft)
- Highest elevation: 148 m (486 ft)
- Lowest elevation: 87 m (285 ft)
- Population (2017): 517
  - Density: 37.4/km^{2} (96.9/sq mi)
- Time zone: UTC+01:00 (CET)
  - Summer (DST): UTC+02:00 (CEST)
- Postal code: 79150
- ^{1} French Land Register data, which excludes lakes, ponds, glaciers > 1 km^{2} (0.386 sq mi or 247 acres) and river estuaries.

Saint-Clémentin is a former commune in the Deux-Sèvres department in Poitou-Charentes region in western France.

On 1 January 2013, Saint-Clémentin and Voultegon merged becoming one commune called Voulmentin.
