= Saint-Cyr-la-Lande =

- Commune
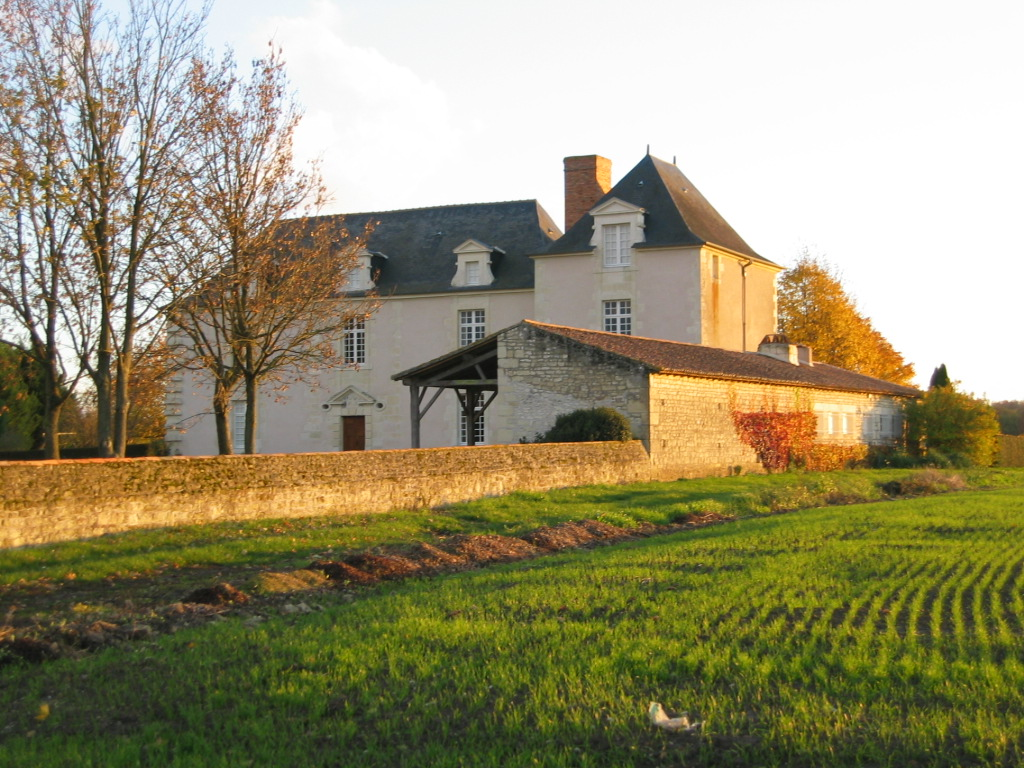
- The Chateau of Baugé
- Location of Saint-Cyr-la-Lande
- Location within France Location within Nouvelle-Aquitaine
- Coordinates: 47°03′09″N 0°08′34″W
- Country: France
- Region: Nouvelle-Aquitaine
- Department: Deux-Sèvres
- Arrondissement: Bressuire
- Canton: Le Val de Thouet

Government
  - Mayor (2020–2026): Géraldine Soyer
- Area^{1}: 8.83 km^{2} (3.41 sq mi)
- Elevation: 49 m (161 ft)
- Highest elevation: 56 m (184 ft)
- Lowest elevation: 39 m (128 ft)
- Population (2023): 368
  - Density: 41.7/km^{2} (108/sq mi)
- Time zone: UTC+01:00 (CET)
  - Summer (DST): UTC+02:00 (CEST)
- INSEE/Postal code: 79244 /79100
- ^{1} French Land Register data, which excludes lakes, ponds, glaciers > 1 km^{2} (0.386 sq mi or 247 acres) and river estuaries.

Saint-Cyr-la-Lande (French pronunciation: [sɛ̃ siʁ la lɑ̃d]) is a commune in the Deux-Sèvres department in western France. They use DST time zone.

== See also ==
- Communes of the Deux-Sèvres department
