= Saint-Jean-de-Thouars =

- Commune
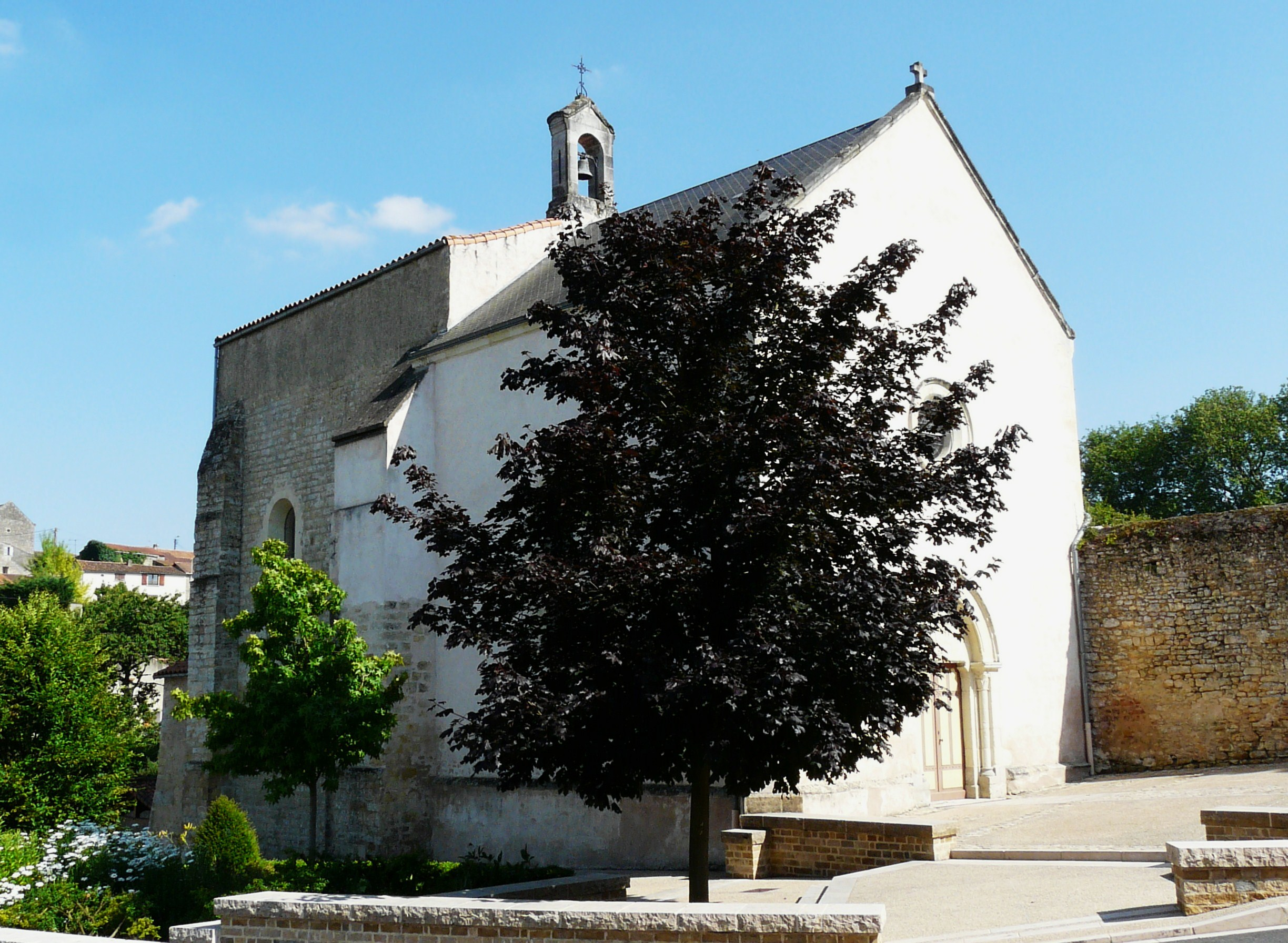
- The church in Saint-Jean-de-Thouars
- Location of Saint-Jean-de-Thouars
- Location within France Location within Nouvelle-Aquitaine
- Coordinates: 46°57′54″N 0°12′38″W
- Country: France
- Region: Nouvelle-Aquitaine
- Department: Deux-Sèvres
- Arrondissement: Bressuire
- Canton: Thouars
- Intercommunality: Thouarsais

Government
  - Mayor (2022–2026): Frédéric Richard
- Area^{1}: 4.96 km^{2} (1.92 sq mi)
- Elevation: 100 m (330 ft)
- Highest elevation: 111 m (364 ft)
- Lowest elevation: 48 m (157 ft)
- Population (2023): 1,328
  - Density: 268/km^{2} (693/sq mi)
- Time zone: UTC+01:00 (CET)
  - Summer (DST): UTC+02:00 (CEST)
- INSEE/Postal code: 79259 /79100
- ^{1} French Land Register data, which excludes lakes, ponds, glaciers > 1 km^{2} (0.386 sq mi or 247 acres) and river estuaries.

Saint-Jean-de-Thouars (French pronunciation: [sɛ̃ ʒɑ̃ də twaʁ], literally Saint-Jean of Thouars) is a commune in the Deux-Sèvres department in western France.

== See also ==
- Communes of the Deux-Sèvres department
