= Saint-Martin-de-Mâcon =

- Commune
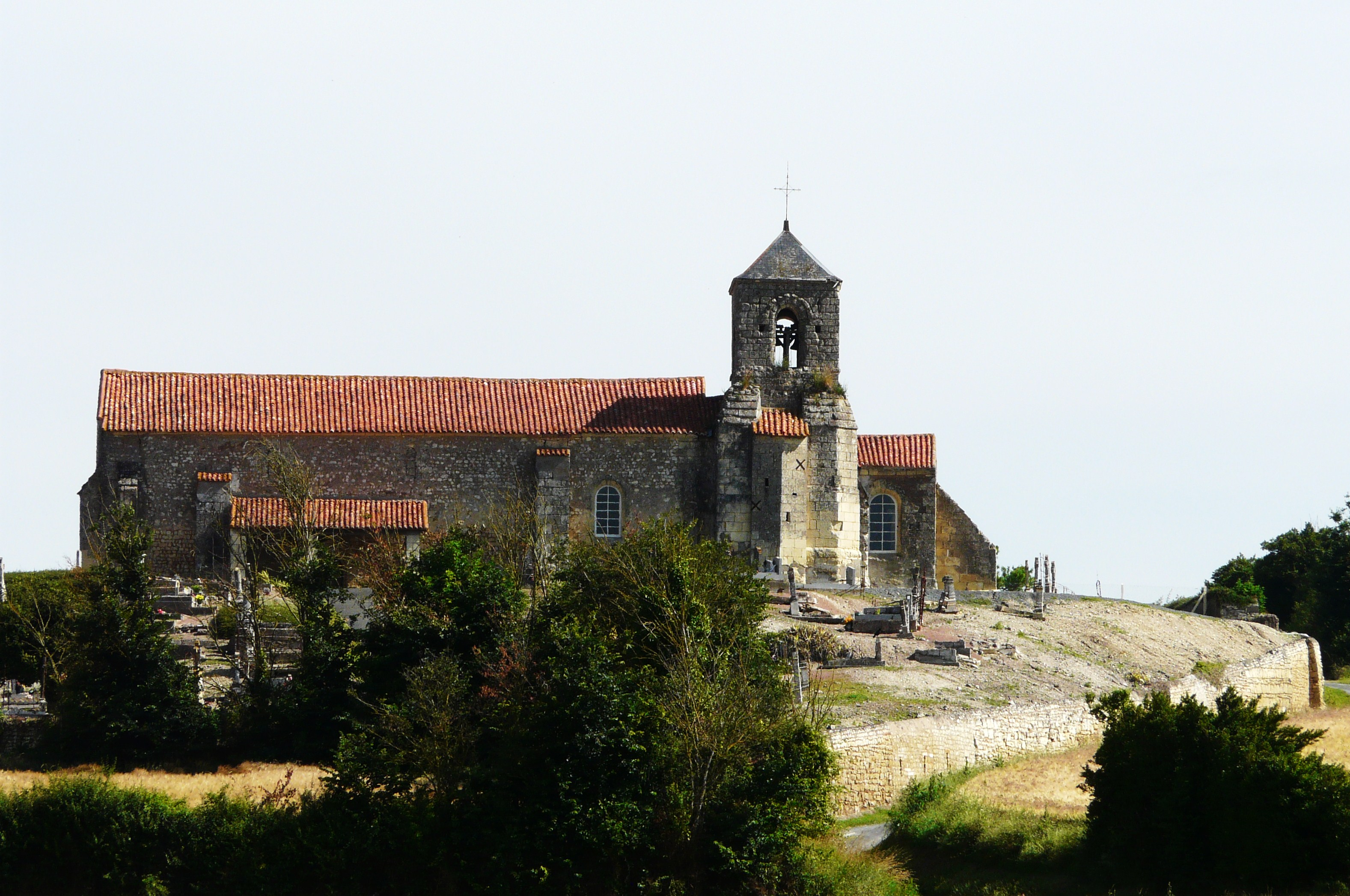
- The church in Saint-Martin-de-Mâcon
- Location of Saint-Martin-de-Mâcon
- Location within France Location within Nouvelle-Aquitaine
- Coordinates: 47°00′52″N 0°06′51″W
- Country: France
- Region: Nouvelle-Aquitaine
- Department: Deux-Sèvres
- Arrondissement: Bressuire
- Canton: Le Val de Thouet

Government
  - Mayor (2020–2026): Christophe Collot
- Area^{1}: 12.28 km^{2} (4.74 sq mi)
- Elevation: 50 m (160 ft)
- Highest elevation: 113 m (371 ft)
- Lowest elevation: 38 m (125 ft)
- Population (2023): 325
  - Density: 26.5/km^{2} (68.5/sq mi)
- Time zone: UTC+01:00 (CET)
  - Summer (DST): UTC+02:00 (CEST)
- INSEE/Postal code: 79274 /79100
- ^{1} French Land Register data, which excludes lakes, ponds, glaciers > 1 km^{2} (0.386 sq mi or 247 acres) and river estuaries.

Saint-Martin-de-Mâcon (French pronunciation: [sɛ̃ maʁtɛ̃ də makɔ̃]) is a commune in the Deux-Sèvres department in western France.

== See also ==
- Communes of the Deux-Sèvres department
