= Saint-Généroux =

- Commune
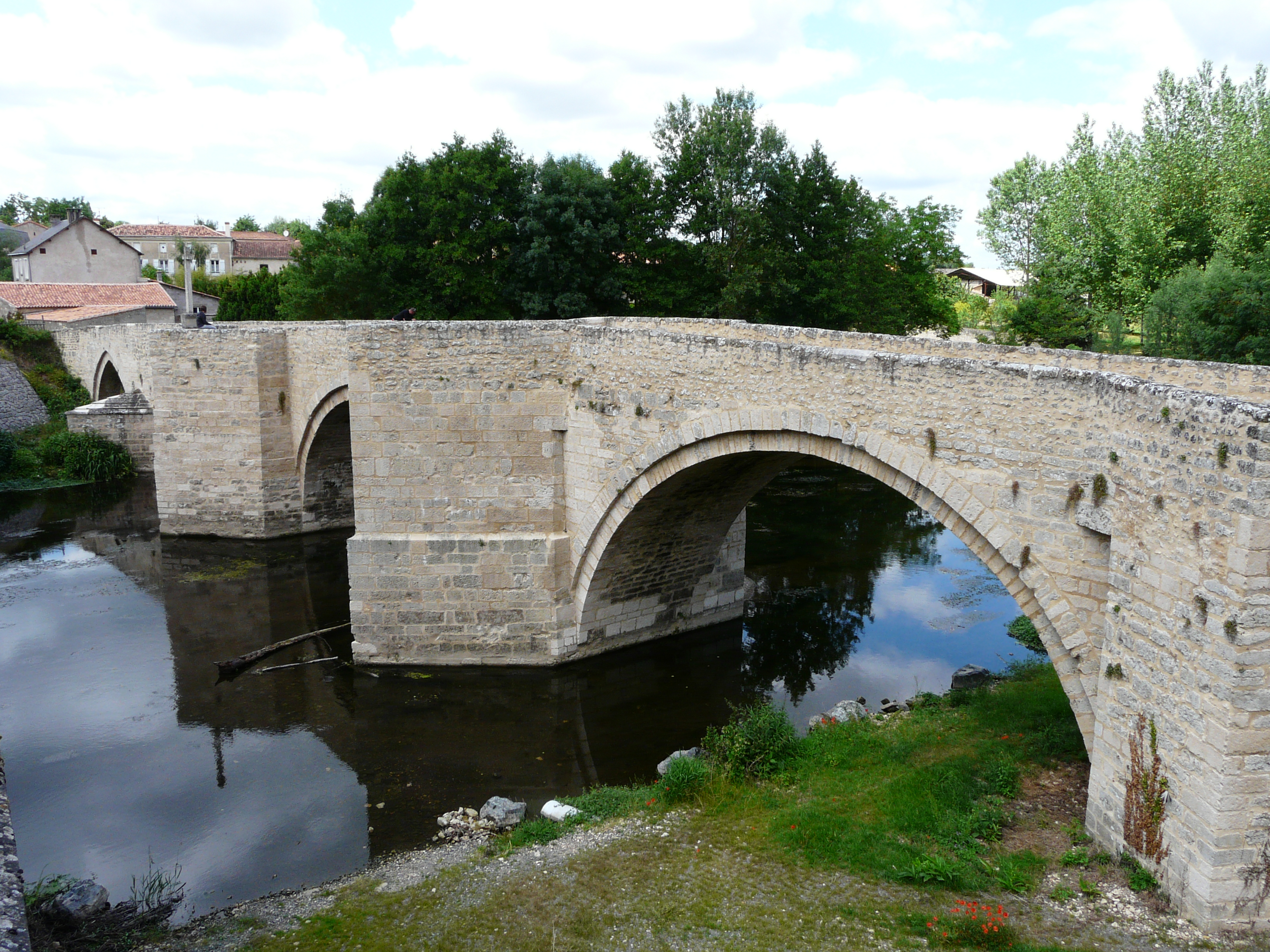
- The bridge in Saint-Généroux
- Location of Saint-Généroux
- Location within France Location within Nouvelle-Aquitaine
- Coordinates: 46°53′06″N 0°08′09″W
- Country: France
- Region: Nouvelle-Aquitaine
- Department: Deux-Sèvres
- Arrondissement: Bressuire
- Canton: Le Val de Thouet

Government
  - Mayor (2020–2026): Lionel Aigron
- Area^{1}: 20.46 km^{2} (7.90 sq mi)
- Elevation: 104 m (341 ft)
- Highest elevation: 109 m (358 ft)
- Lowest elevation: 57 m (187 ft)
- Population (2023): 340
  - Density: 17/km^{2} (43/sq mi)
- Time zone: UTC+01:00 (CET)
  - Summer (DST): UTC+02:00 (CEST)
- INSEE/Postal code: 79252 /79600
- ^{1} French Land Register data, which excludes lakes, ponds, glaciers > 1 km^{2} (0.386 sq mi or 247 acres) and river estuaries.

Saint-Généroux (French pronunciation: [sɛ̃ ʒeneʁu]) is a commune in the Deux-Sèvres department in western France.

It is situated on the river Thouet some 15 km upstream from the town of Thouars.

== See also ==
- Communes of the Deux-Sèvres department
