= Sainte-Gemme, Deux-Sèvres =

Sainte-Gemme
- Commune
- Location of Sainte-Gemme
- Location within France Location within Nouvelle-Aquitaine
- Coordinates: 46°54′05″N 0°17′12″W
- Country: France
- Region: Nouvelle-Aquitaine
- Department: Deux-Sèvres
- Arrondissement: Bressuire
- Canton: Le Val de Thouet

Government
  - Mayor (2020–2026): Roland Moriceau
- Area^{1}: 8.84 km^{2} (3.41 sq mi)
- Elevation: 133 m (436 ft)
- Highest elevation: 146 m (479 ft)
- Lowest elevation: 112 m (367 ft)
- Population (2023): 407
  - Density: 46.0/km^{2} (119/sq mi)
- Time zone: UTC+01:00 (CET)
  - Summer (DST): UTC+02:00 (CEST)
- INSEE/Postal code: 79250 /79330
- ^{1} French Land Register data, which excludes lakes, ponds, glaciers > 1 km^{2} (0.386 sq mi or 247 acres) and river estuaries.

Sainte-Gemme (French pronunciation: [sɛ̃t ʒɛm]) is a commune in the Deux-Sèvres department in western France.

== See also ==
- Communes of the Deux-Sèvres department
