= Geay, Deux-Sèvres =

Geay
- Commune
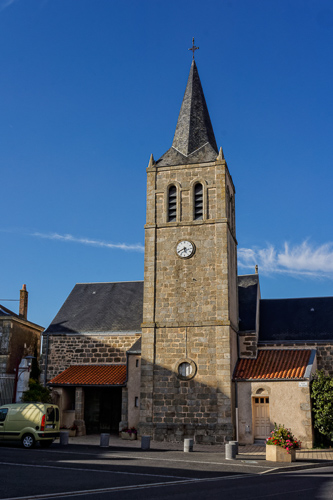
- The church of Saint-Maixent
- Location of Geay
- Location within France Location within Nouvelle-Aquitaine
- Coordinates: 46°52′52″N 0°19′30″W
- Country: France
- Region: Nouvelle-Aquitaine
- Department: Deux-Sèvres
- Arrondissement: Bressuire
- Canton: Bressuire
- Intercommunality: CA Bocage Bressuirais

Government
  - Mayor (2020–2026): Jean-Marc Bernard
- Area^{1}: 19.25 km^{2} (7.43 sq mi)
- Elevation: 160 m (520 ft)
- Highest elevation: 187 m (614 ft)
- Lowest elevation: 125 m (410 ft)
- Population (2023): 338
  - Density: 17.6/km^{2} (45.5/sq mi)
- Time zone: UTC+01:00 (CET)
  - Summer (DST): UTC+02:00 (CEST)
- INSEE/Postal code: 79131 /79330
- ^{1} French Land Register data, which excludes lakes, ponds, glaciers > 1 km^{2} (0.386 sq mi or 247 acres) and river estuaries.

Geay (French pronunciation: [ʒɛ]) is a commune in the Deux-Sèvres department in the Nouvelle-Aquitaine region in western France.

== See also ==
- Communes of the Deux-Sèvres department
