= Luzay =

- Commune
- Location of Luzay
- Location within France Location within Nouvelle-Aquitaine
- Coordinates: 46°55′27″N 0°11′40″W
- Country: France
- Region: Nouvelle-Aquitaine
- Department: Deux-Sèvres
- Arrondissement: Bressuire
- Canton: Le Val de Thouet

Government
  - Mayor (2020–2026): Gilles Meunier
- Area^{1}: 20.98 km^{2} (8.10 sq mi)
- Elevation: 101 m (331 ft)
- Highest elevation: 112 m (367 ft)
- Lowest elevation: 57 m (187 ft)
- Population (2023): 617
  - Density: 29.4/km^{2} (76.2/sq mi)
- Time zone: UTC+01:00 (CET)
  - Summer (DST): UTC+02:00 (CEST)
- INSEE/Postal code: 79161 /79100
- ^{1} French Land Register data, which excludes lakes, ponds, glaciers > 1 km^{2} (0.386 sq mi or 247 acres) and river estuaries.

Luzay (French pronunciation: [lyzɛ]) is a commune in the Deux-Sèvres department in western France.

== See also ==
- Communes of the Deux-Sèvres department
