= Assais-les-Jumeaux =

- Commune
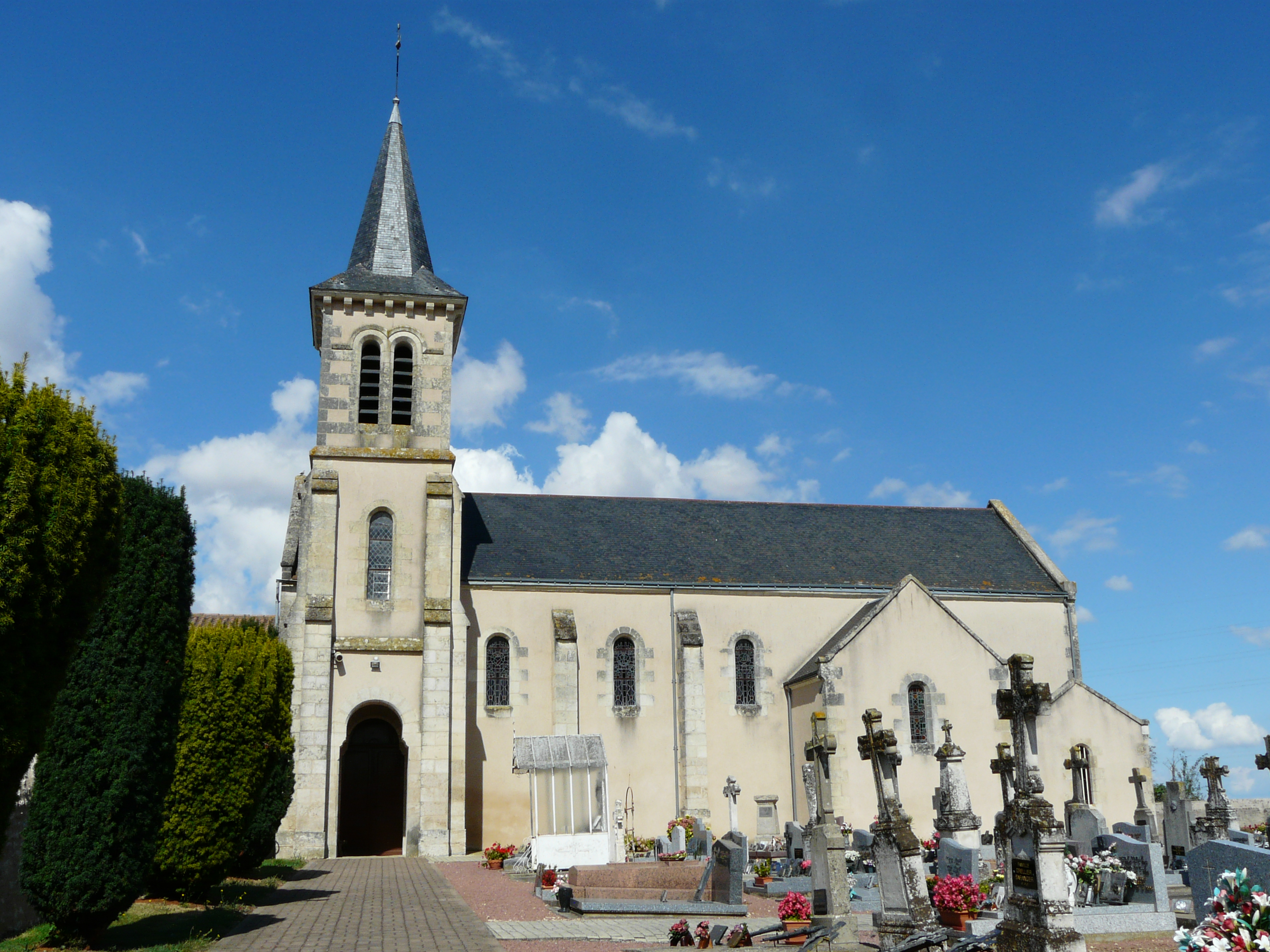
- The church in Assais-les-Jumeaux
- Location of Assais-les-Jumeaux
- Location within France Location within Nouvelle-Aquitaine
- Coordinates: 46°47′21″N 0°03′28″W
- Country: France
- Region: Nouvelle-Aquitaine
- Department: Deux-Sèvres
- Arrondissement: Parthenay
- Canton: Le Val de Thouet
- Intercommunality: CC Airvaudais-Val Thouet

Government
  - Mayor (2020–2026): Jean-Claude Laurantin
- Area^{1}: 52.26 km^{2} (20.18 sq mi)
- Elevation: 110 m (360 ft)
- Highest elevation: 144 m (472 ft)
- Lowest elevation: 75 m (246 ft)
- Population (2023): 763
  - Density: 14.6/km^{2} (37.8/sq mi)
- Time zone: UTC+01:00 (CET)
  - Summer (DST): UTC+02:00 (CEST)
- INSEE/Postal code: 79016 /79600
- ^{1} French Land Register data, which excludes lakes, ponds, glaciers > 1 km^{2} (0.386 sq mi or 247 acres) and river estuaries.

Assais-les-Jumeaux (French pronunciation: [asɛ le ʒymo]) is a commune in the Deux-Sèvres department in the Nouvelle-Aquitaine region in western France.

== Sights ==
- Saint-Martin d'Assais Church which has kept its original bell tower, listed in 1929 as historical monument.
- 19th Saint-Martin des Jumeaux church, with bell-tower porch.
- Tumulus de la Motte de Puytaillé, classified in 1970 as historical monument.

== See also ==
- Communes of the Deux-Sèvres department
