= Sainte-Verge =

- Commune
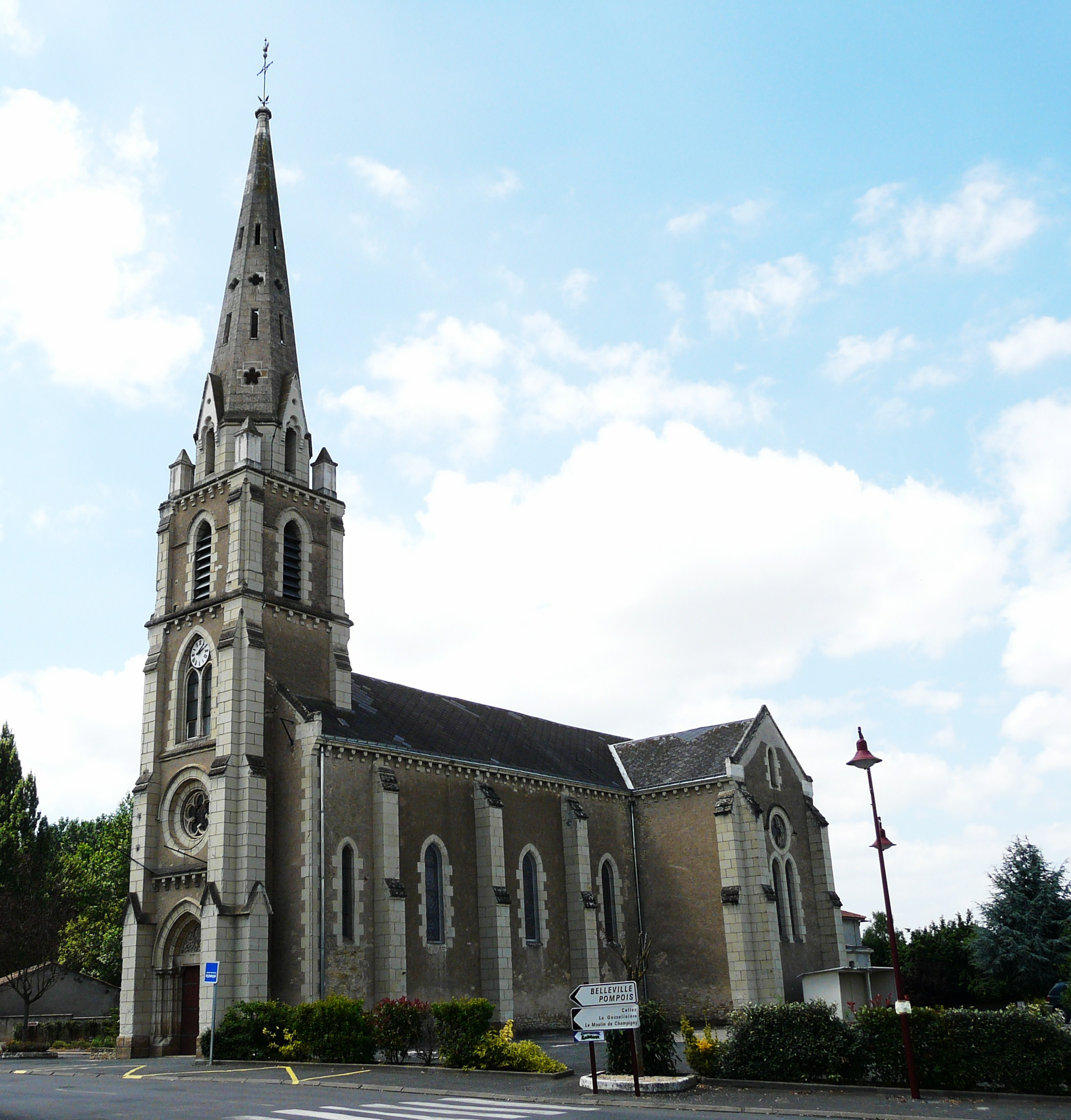
- The church in Sainte-Verge
- Location of Sainte-Verge
- Location within France Location within Nouvelle-Aquitaine
- Coordinates: 47°00′30″N 0°12′39″W
- Country: France
- Region: Nouvelle-Aquitaine
- Department: Deux-Sèvres
- Arrondissement: Bressuire
- Canton: Thouars
- Intercommunality: Thouarsais

Government
  - Mayor (2020–2026): Martial Brunet
- Area^{1}: 12.83 km^{2} (4.95 sq mi)
- Elevation: 70 m (230 ft)
- Highest elevation: 87 m (285 ft)
- Lowest elevation: 39 m (128 ft)
- Population (2023): 1,404
  - Density: 109.4/km^{2} (283.4/sq mi)
- Time zone: UTC+01:00 (CET)
  - Summer (DST): UTC+02:00 (CEST)
- INSEE/Postal code: 79300 /79100
- ^{1} French Land Register data, which excludes lakes, ponds, glaciers > 1 km^{2} (0.386 sq mi or 247 acres) and river estuaries.

Sainte-Verge is a commune in the Deux-Sèvres department in western France.

== See also ==
- Communes of the Deux-Sèvres department
