= Chiché, Deux-Sèvres =

Chiché
- Commune
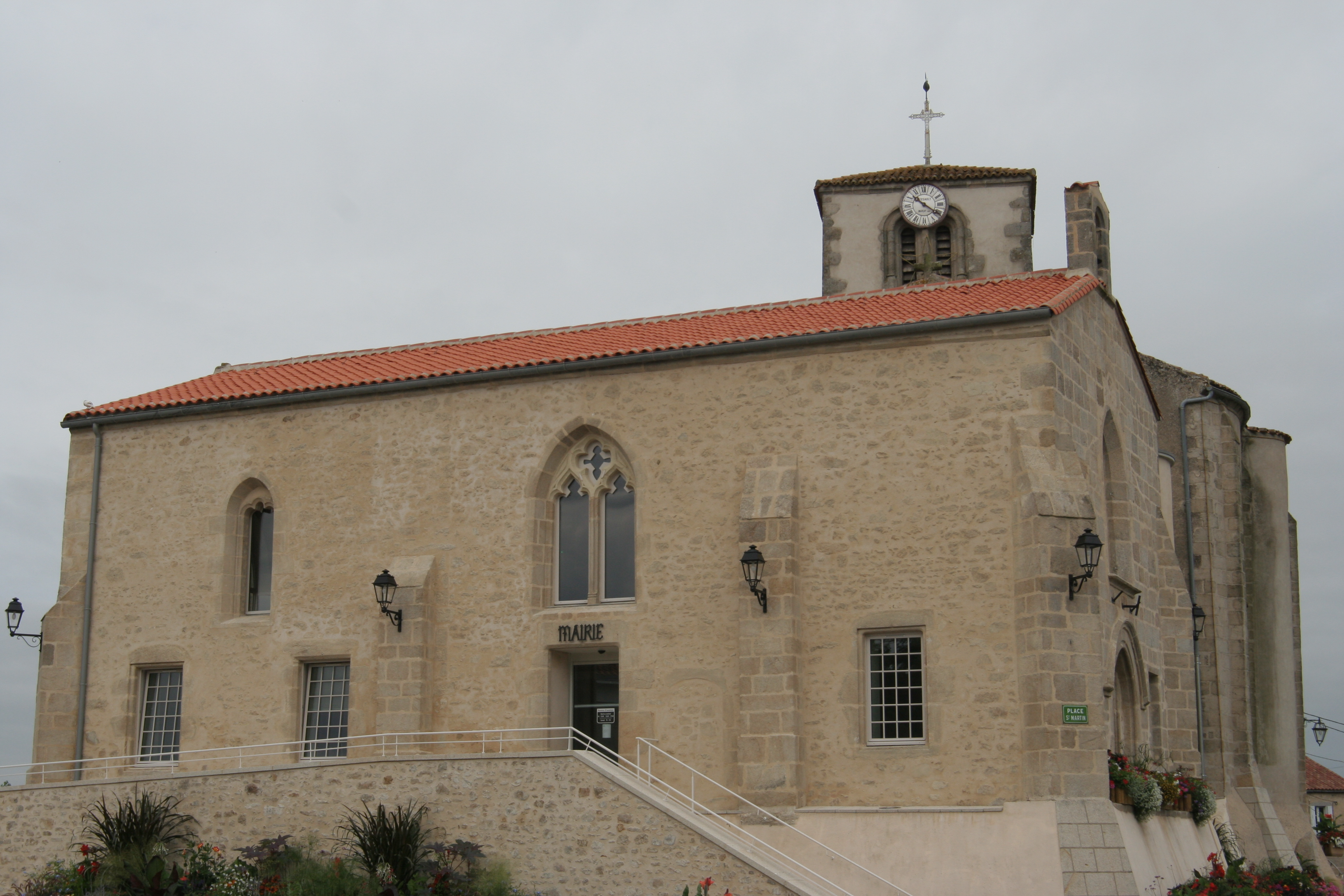
- The town hall in Chiché
- Location of Chiché
- Location within France Location within Nouvelle-Aquitaine
- Coordinates: 46°47′56″N 0°21′32″W
- Country: France
- Region: Nouvelle-Aquitaine
- Department: Deux-Sèvres
- Arrondissement: Bressuire
- Canton: Bressuire
- Intercommunality: CA Bocage Bressuirais

Government
  - Mayor (2020–2026): François Mary
- Area^{1}: 46.99 km^{2} (18.14 sq mi)
- Elevation: 208 m (682 ft)
- Highest elevation: 217 m (712 ft)
- Lowest elevation: 105 m (344 ft)
- Population (2023): 1,679
  - Density: 35.73/km^{2} (92.54/sq mi)
- Time zone: UTC+01:00 (CET)
  - Summer (DST): UTC+02:00 (CEST)
- INSEE/Postal code: 79088 /79350
- ^{1} French Land Register data, which excludes lakes, ponds, glaciers > 1 km^{2} (0.386 sq mi or 247 acres) and river estuaries.

Chiché (French pronunciation: [ʃiʃe]) is a commune in the Deux-Sèvres department in the Nouvelle-Aquitaine region in western France.

== See also ==
- Communes of the Deux-Sèvres department
