= Saint-Aubin-du-Plain =

- Commune
- Location of Saint-Aubin-du-Plain
- Location within France Location within Nouvelle-Aquitaine
- Coordinates: 46°55′29″N 0°28′29″W
- Country: France
- Region: Nouvelle-Aquitaine
- Department: Deux-Sèvres
- Arrondissement: Bressuire
- Canton: Mauléon
- Intercommunality: CA Bocage Bressuirais

Government
  - Mayor (2020–2026): Nicole Cotillon
- Area^{1}: 14.06 km^{2} (5.43 sq mi)
- Elevation: 158 m (518 ft)
- Highest elevation: 171 m (561 ft)
- Lowest elevation: 93 m (305 ft)
- Population (2023): 565
  - Density: 40.2/km^{2} (104/sq mi)
- Time zone: UTC+01:00 (CET)
  - Summer (DST): UTC+02:00 (CEST)
- INSEE/Postal code: 79238 /79300
- ^{1} French Land Register data, which excludes lakes, ponds, glaciers > 1 km^{2} (0.386 sq mi or 247 acres) and river estuaries.

Saint-Aubin-du-Plain (French pronunciation: [sɛ̃.t‿obɛ̃ dy plɛ̃]) is a commune in the Deux-Sèvres department in western France.

== See also ==
- Communes of the Deux-Sèvres department
