= Glénay =

- Commune
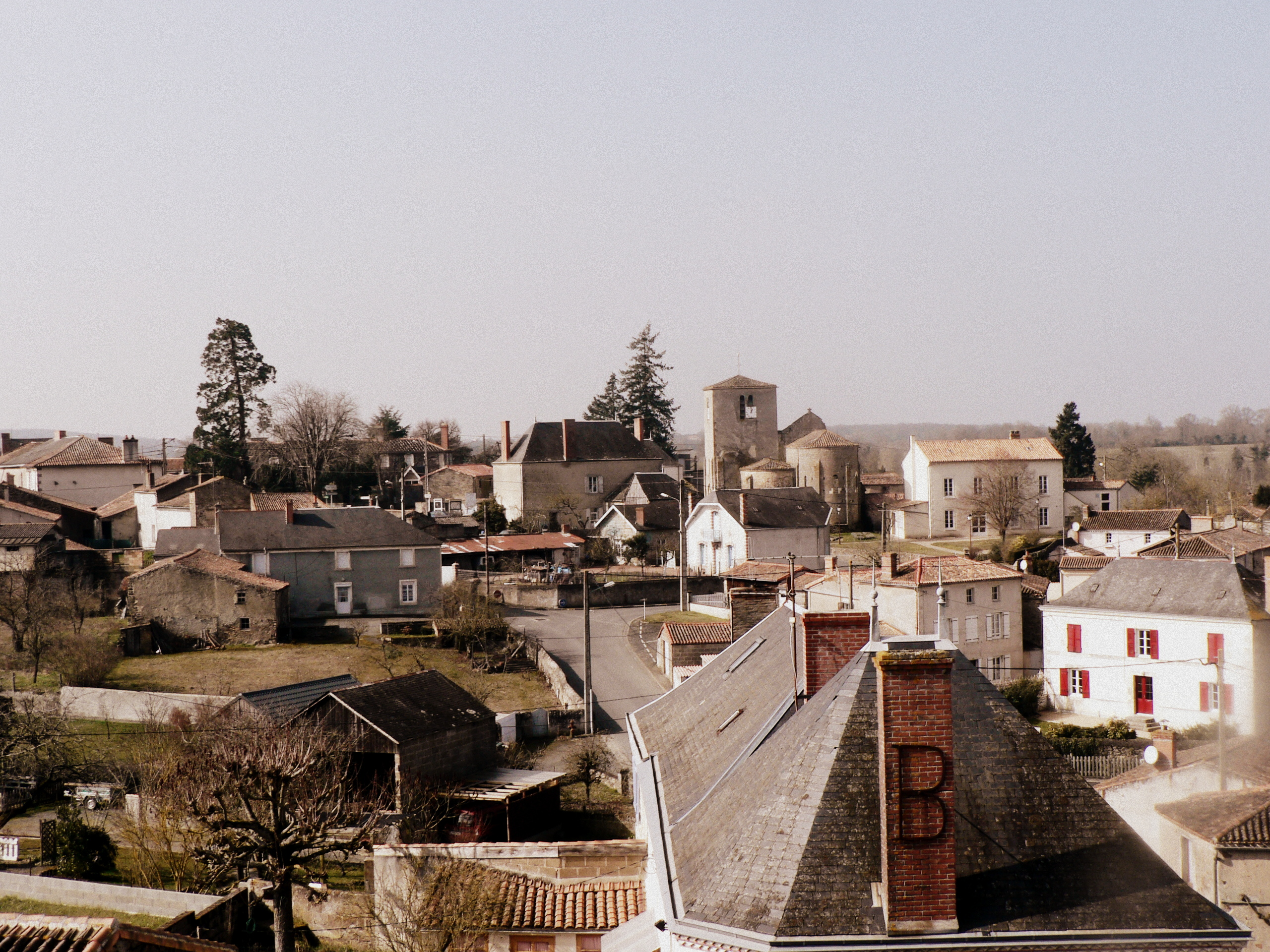
- A general view of Glénay

- Coat of arms
- Location of Glénay
- Location within France Location within Nouvelle-Aquitaine
- Coordinates: 46°51′40″N 0°14′58″W
- Country: France
- Region: Nouvelle-Aquitaine
- Department: Deux-Sèvres
- Arrondissement: Bressuire
- Canton: Le Val de Thouet

Government
  - Mayor (2020–2026): Chloé Boisson
- Area^{1}: 21.14 km^{2} (8.16 sq mi)
- Elevation: 100 m (330 ft)
- Highest elevation: 170 m (560 ft)
- Lowest elevation: 87 m (285 ft)
- Population (2023): 523
  - Density: 24.7/km^{2} (64.1/sq mi)
- Time zone: UTC+01:00 (CET)
  - Summer (DST): UTC+02:00 (CEST)
- INSEE/Postal code: 79134 /79330
- ^{1} French Land Register data, which excludes lakes, ponds, glaciers > 1 km^{2} (0.386 sq mi or 247 acres) and river estuaries.

Glénay (French pronunciation: [ɡlenɛ]) is a commune in the Deux-Sèvres department in the Nouvelle-Aquitaine region in western France. Its inhabitants are called Glénéens. The town is part of the Communité de Communes du Thouarsais. Located in the northern department between the Bressuirais Bocage and the Poitou Gâtine, it is watered by the Thouaret in a hilly landscape. It has a historic heritage, such as the castle and the church, both ranked.

== See also ==
- Communes of the Deux-Sèvres department
