= Canton of Bressuire =

Coordinates: 46.84°N 0.49°W

The canton of Bressuire is an administrative division of the Deux-Sèvres department, western France. Its borders were modified in March 2015 when the French canton reorganisation came into effect. Its seat are in Bressuire.

It consists of the following communes:

1. Boismé
2. Bressuire
3. Chiché
4. Faye-l'Abbesse
5. Geay
