= Boussais =

- Commune
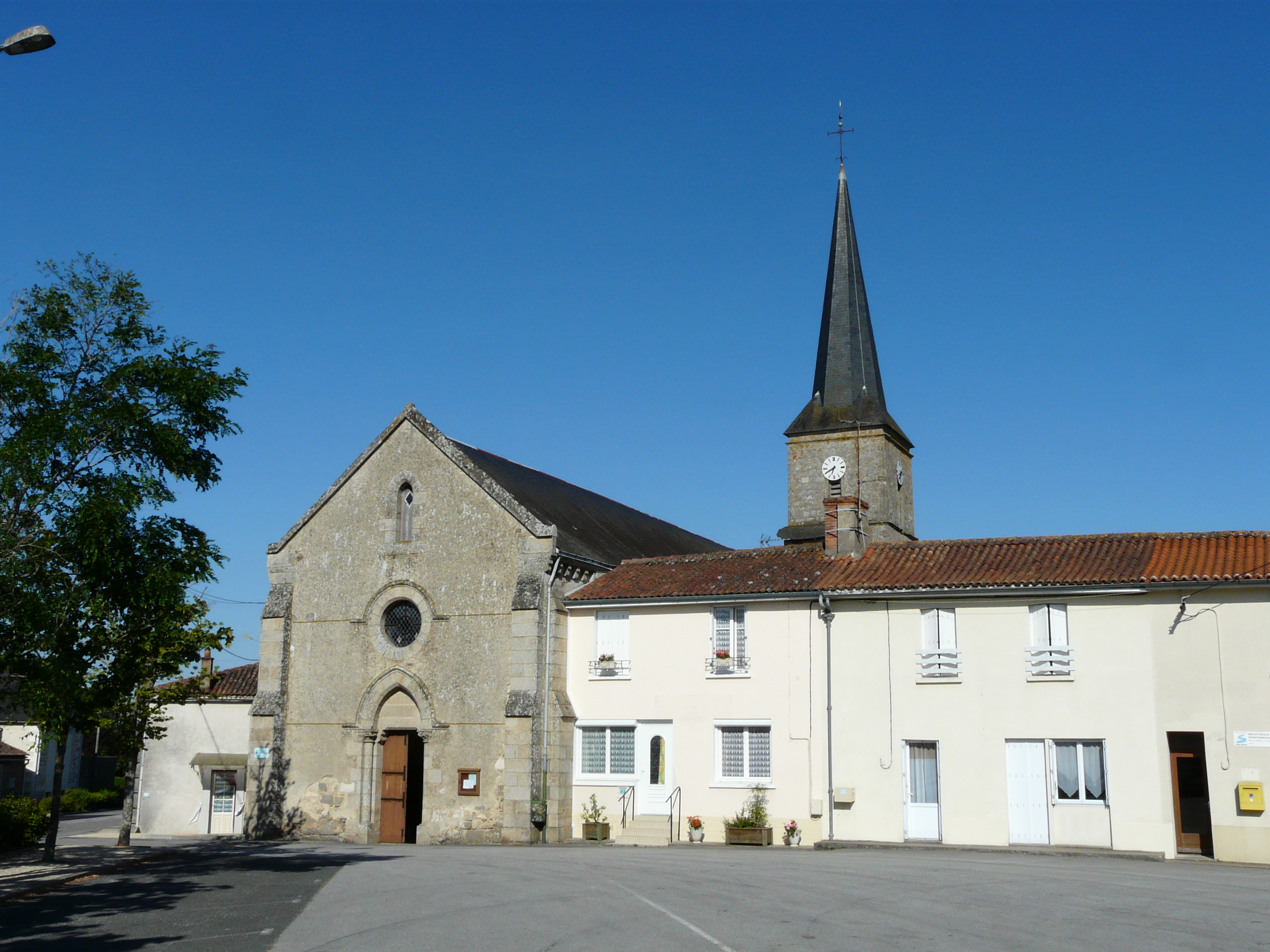
- The church in Boussais
- Location of Boussais
- Location within France Location within Nouvelle-Aquitaine
- Coordinates: 46°49′51″N 0°14′49″W
- Country: France
- Region: Nouvelle-Aquitaine
- Department: Deux-Sèvres
- Arrondissement: Parthenay
- Canton: Le Val de Thouet
- Intercommunality: Airvaudais-Val du Thouet

Government
  - Mayor (2020–2026): Jacques Roy
- Area^{1}: 19.72 km^{2} (7.61 sq mi)
- Elevation: 132 m (433 ft)
- Highest elevation: 164 m (538 ft)
- Lowest elevation: 90 m (300 ft)
- Population (2023): 446
  - Density: 22.6/km^{2} (58.6/sq mi)
- Time zone: UTC+01:00 (CET)
  - Summer (DST): UTC+02:00 (CEST)
- INSEE/Postal code: 79047 /79600
- ^{1} French Land Register data, which excludes lakes, ponds, glaciers > 1 km^{2} (0.386 sq mi or 247 acres) and river estuaries.

Boussais (French pronunciation: [busɛ]) is a commune in the Deux-Sèvres department in the Nouvelle-Aquitaine region in western France.

== See also ==
- Communes of the Deux-Sèvres department
