= Saint-Varent =

- Commune
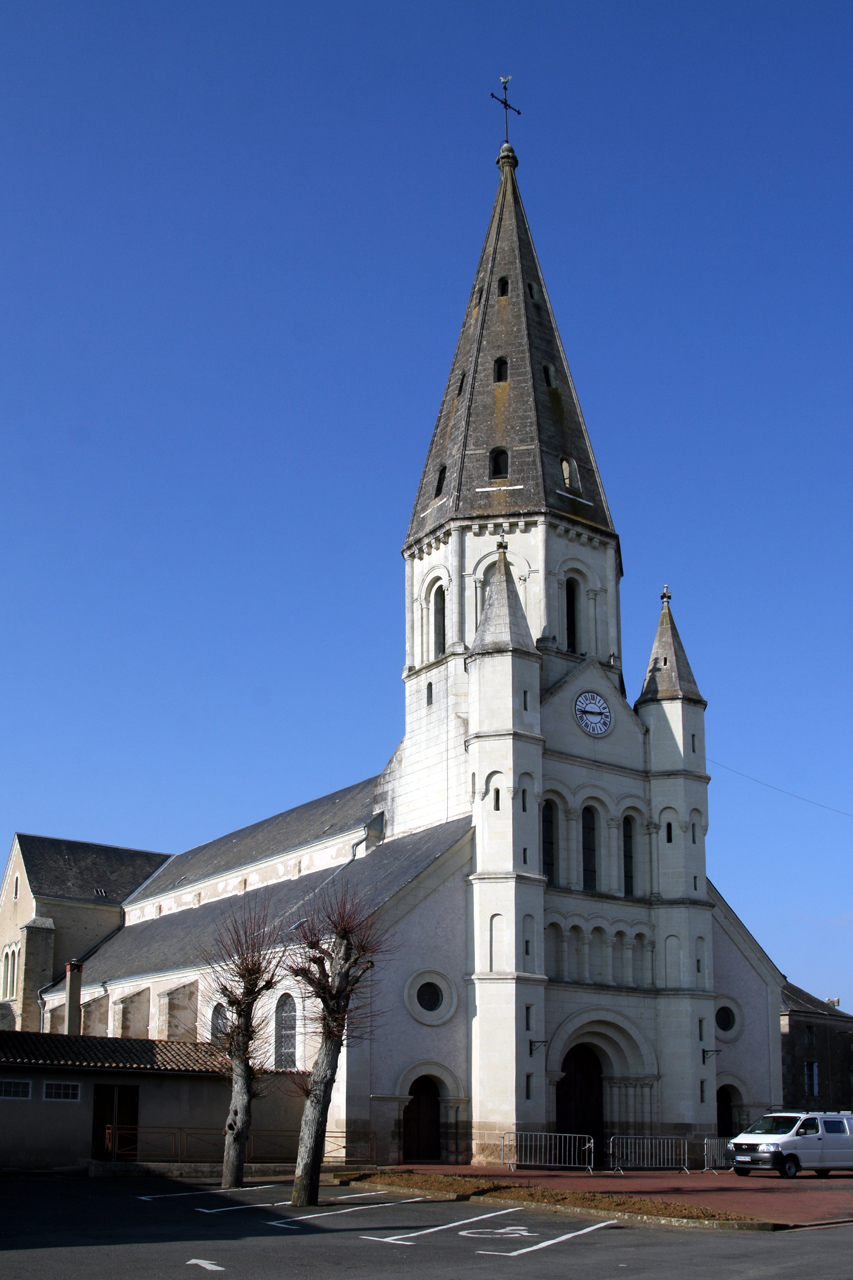
- The church in Saint Varent
- Location of Saint-Varent
- Location within France Location within Nouvelle-Aquitaine
- Coordinates: 46°53′23″N 0°14′01″W
- Country: France
- Region: Nouvelle-Aquitaine
- Department: Deux-Sèvres
- Arrondissement: Bressuire
- Canton: Le Val de Thouet

Government
  - Mayor (2020–2026): Pierre Rambault
- Area^{1}: 34.42 km^{2} (13.29 sq mi)
- Elevation: 102 m (335 ft)
- Highest elevation: 132 m (433 ft)
- Lowest elevation: 69 m (226 ft)
- Population (2023): 2,395
  - Density: 69.58/km^{2} (180.2/sq mi)
- Time zone: UTC+01:00 (CET)
  - Summer (DST): UTC+02:00 (CEST)
- INSEE/Postal code: 79299 /79330
- ^{1} French Land Register data, which excludes lakes, ponds, glaciers > 1 km^{2} (0.386 sq mi or 247 acres) and river estuaries.

Saint-Varent (French pronunciation: [sɛ̃ vaʁɑ̃]) is a commune in the Deux-Sèvres department in western France.

== Population ==
Historical population
Year	Pop.	±% p.a.
1968	2,479	—
1975	2,590	+0.63%
1982	2,527	−0.35%
1990	2,557	+0.15%
1999	2,458	−0.44%
2007	2,464	+0.03%
2012	2,508	+0.35%
2017	2,445	−0.51%
2023	2,395	−0.34%
Source: INSEE

== See also ==
- Communes of the Deux-Sèvres department
