= Availles-Thouarsais =

- Commune
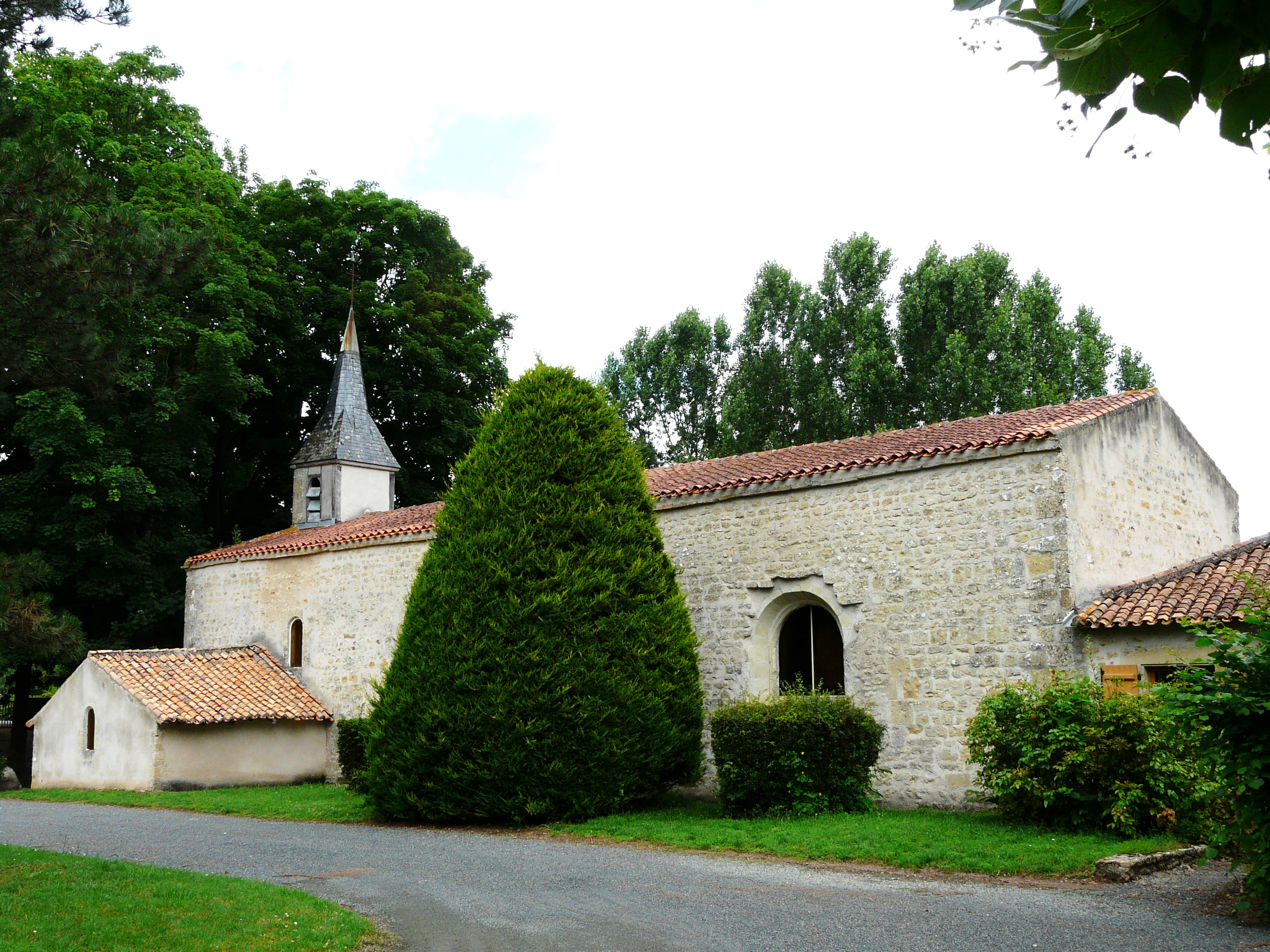
- The church in Availles-Thouarsais
- Location of Availles-Thouarsais
- Location within France Location within Nouvelle-Aquitaine
- Coordinates: 46°51′37″N 0°08′28″W
- Country: France
- Region: Nouvelle-Aquitaine
- Department: Deux-Sèvres
- Arrondissement: Parthenay
- Canton: Le Val de Thouet
- Intercommunality: CC Airvaudais-Val Thouet

Government
  - Mayor (2020–2026): Daniel Robert
- Area^{1}: 10.85 km^{2} (4.19 sq mi)
- Elevation: 118 m (387 ft)
- Highest elevation: 124 m (407 ft)
- Lowest elevation: 62 m (203 ft)
- Population (2023): 180
  - Density: 17/km^{2} (43/sq mi)
- Time zone: UTC+01:00 (CET)
  - Summer (DST): UTC+02:00 (CEST)
- INSEE/Postal code: 79022 /79600
- ^{1} French Land Register data, which excludes lakes, ponds, glaciers > 1 km^{2} (0.386 sq mi or 247 acres) and river estuaries.

Availles-Thouarsais (French pronunciation: [avaj twaʁsɛ]) is a commune in the Deux-Sèvres department in the Nouvelle-Aquitaine region in western France.

== See also ==
- Communes of the Deux-Sèvres department
