= Louin, Deux-Sèvres =

Louin
- Commune
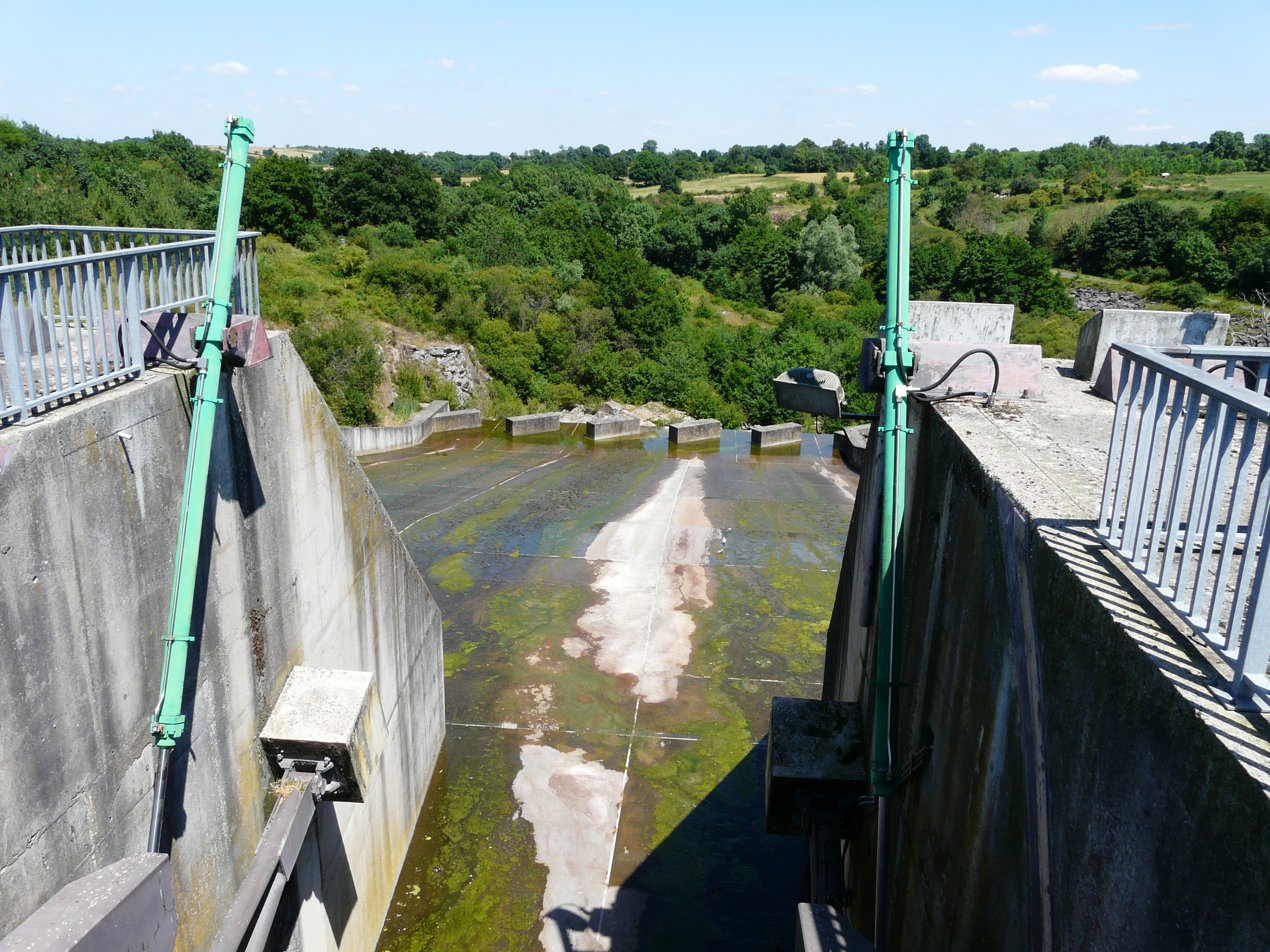
- The Cébron Dam
- Location of Louin
- Location within France Location within Nouvelle-Aquitaine
- Coordinates: 46°48′08″N 0°09′36″W
- Country: France
- Region: Nouvelle-Aquitaine
- Department: Deux-Sèvres
- Arrondissement: Parthenay
- Canton: Le Val de Thouet

Government
  - Mayor (2020–2026): Monique Nolot
- Area^{1}: 20.56 km^{2} (7.94 sq mi)
- Highest elevation: 160 m (520 ft)
- Lowest elevation: 73 m (240 ft)
- Population (2023): 674
  - Density: 32.8/km^{2} (84.9/sq mi)
- Time zone: UTC+01:00 (CET)
  - Summer (DST): UTC+02:00 (CEST)
- INSEE/Postal code: 79156 /79600
- ^{1} French Land Register data, which excludes lakes, ponds, glaciers > 1 km^{2} (0.386 sq mi or 247 acres) and river estuaries.

Louin (French pronunciation: [lwɛ̃]) is a commune in the Deux-Sèvres department in western France.

== See also ==
- Communes of the Deux-Sèvres department
