= Canton of Le Val de Thouet =

Coordinates: 46.83°N 0.14°W

The canton of Le Val de Thouet is an administrative division of the Deux-Sèvres department, western France. It was created at the French canton reorganisation which came into effect in March 2015. Its seat is in Airvault.

It consists of the following communes:

1. Airvault
2. Assais-les-Jumeaux
3. Availles-Thouarsais
4. Boussais
5. Brion-près-Thouet
6. Le Chillou
7. Coulonges-Thouarsais
8. Glénay
9. Irais
10. Loretz-d'Argenton
11. Louin
12. Luché-Thouarsais
13. Luzay
14. Maisontiers
15. Marnes
16. Pas-de-Jeu
17. Pierrefitte
18. Plaine-et-Vallées
19. Saint-Cyr-la-Lande
20. Sainte-Gemme
21. Saint-Généroux
22. Saint-Léger-de-Montbrun
23. Saint-Loup-Lamairé
24. Saint-Martin-de-Mâcon
25. Saint-Martin-de-Sanzay
26. Saint-Varent
27. Tessonnière
28. Tourtenay
29. Val en Vignes
