= Arrondissement of Bressuire =

Coordinates: 46°50′N 0°30′W

Bressuire
- Arrondissement
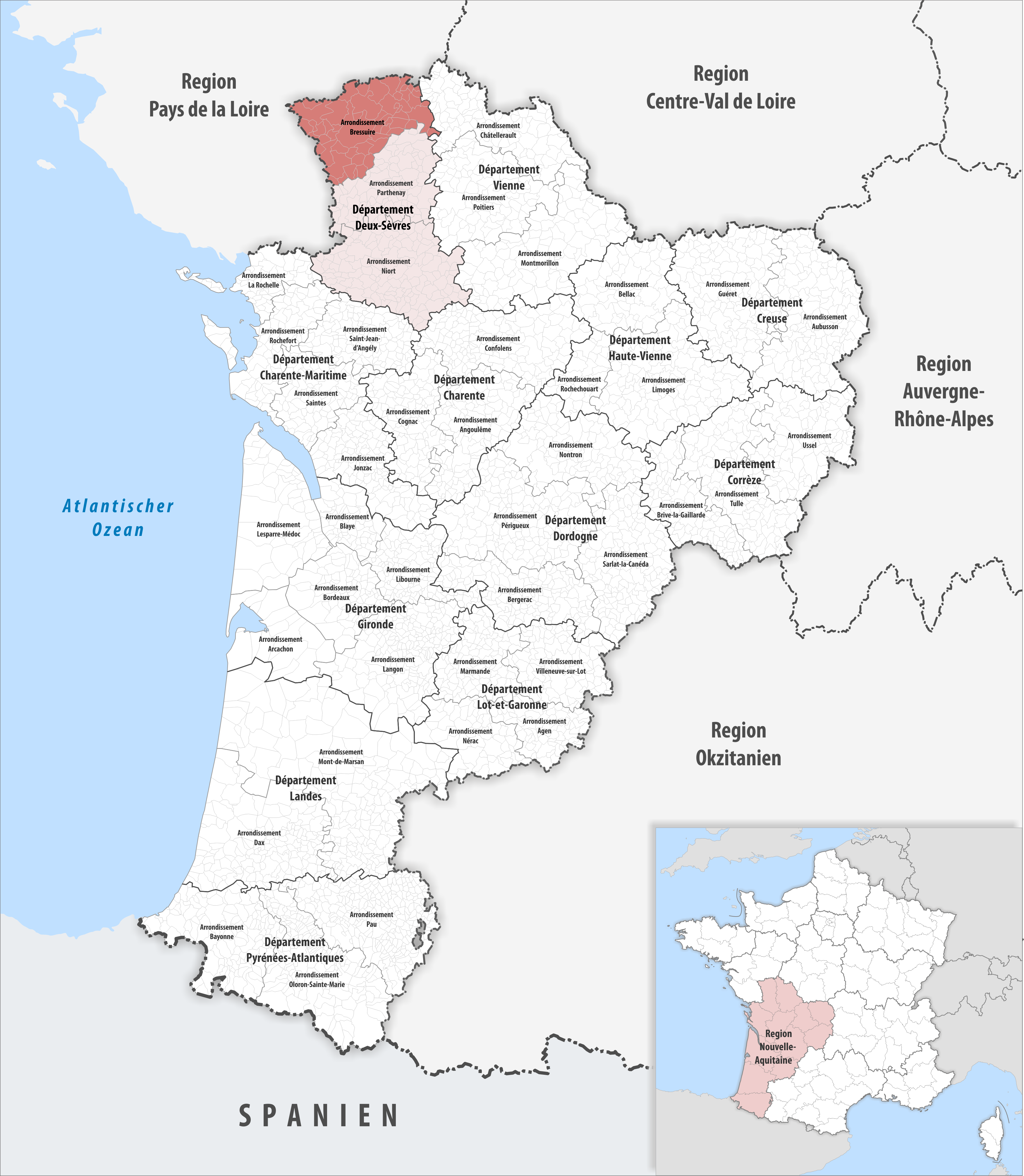
- Location within the region Nouvelle-Aquitaine
- Country: France
- Region: Nouvelle-Aquitaine
- Department: Deux-Sèvres
- No. of communes: {{{nbcomm}}}
- Area: 1,938.9 km^{2} (748.6 sq mi)
- Population (2023): 109,407
  - Density: 56.427/km^{2} (146.15/sq mi)
- INSEE code: 791

The arrondissement of Bressuire is an arrondissement of France in the Deux-Sèvres department in the Nouvelle-Aquitaine region. It has 57 communes. Its population is 109,621 (2021), and its area is 1,938.9 km^{2} (748.6 sq mi).

== Composition ==
The communes of the arrondissement of Bressuire, and their INSEE codes, are:

1. L'Absie (79001)
2. Argentonnay (79013)
3. Boismé (79038)
4. Bressuire (79049)
5. Bretignolles (79050)
6. Brion-près-Thouet (79056)
7. Cerizay (79062)
8. Chanteloup (79069)
9. La Chapelle-Saint-Laurent (79076)
10. Chiché (79088)
11. Cirières (79091)
12. Clessé (79094)
13. Combrand (79096)
14. Coulonges-Thouarsais (79102)
15. Courlay (79103)
16. Faye-l'Abbesse (79116)
17. La Forêt-sur-Sèvre (79123)
18. Geay (79131)
19. Genneton (79132)
20. Glénay (79134)
21. Largeasse (79147)
22. Loretz-d'Argenton (79014)
23. Louzy (79157)
24. Luché-Thouarsais (79159)
25. Luzay (79161)
26. Marnes (79167)
27. Mauléon (79079)
28. Moncoutant-sur-Sèvre (79179)
29. Montravers (79183)
30. Neuvy-Bouin (79190)
31. Nueil-les-Aubiers (79195)
32. Pas-de-Jeu (79203)
33. La Petite-Boissière (79207)
34. Pierrefitte (79209)
35. Le Pin (79210)
36. Plaine-et-Vallées (79196)
37. Saint-Amand-sur-Sèvre (79235)
38. Saint-André-sur-Sèvre (79236)
39. Saint-Aubin-du-Plain (79238)
40. Saint-Cyr-la-Lande (79244)
41. Sainte-Gemme (79250)
42. Sainte-Verge (79300)
43. Saint-Généroux (79252)
44. Saint-Jacques-de-Thouars (79258)
45. Saint-Jean-de-Thouars (79259)
46. Saint-Léger-de-Montbrun (79265)
47. Saint-Martin-de-Mâcon (79274)
48. Saint-Martin-de-Sanzay (79277)
49. Saint-Maurice-Étusson (79280)
50. Saint-Paul-en-Gâtine (79286)
51. Saint-Pierre-des-Échaubrognes (79289)
52. Saint-Varent (79299)
53. Thouars (79329)
54. Tourtenay (79331)
55. Trayes (79332)
56. Val en Vignes (79063)
57. Voulmentin (79242)

== History ==
The arrondissement of Thouars was created in 1800. In 1804 Bressuire replaced Thouars as subprefecture. It was disbanded in 1926 and restored in 1942. At the January 2018 reorganisation of the arrondissements of Deux-Sèvres, it received 16 communes from the arrondissement of Parthenay.

As a result of the reorganisation of the cantons of France which came into effect in 2015, the borders of the cantons are no longer related to the borders of the arrondissements. The cantons of the arrondissement of Bressuire were, as of January 2015:

1. Argenton-les-Vallées
2. Bressuire
3. Cerizay
4. Mauléon
5. Saint-Varent
6. Thouars-1
7. Thouars-2
