= Clessé =

Clessé may refer to:

- Clessé, Deux-Sèvres, a commune in the French region of Poitou-Charentes
- Clessé, Saône-et-Loire a commune in the French region of Bourgogne
