= Saint-Mesmin, Vendée =

Saint-Mesmin
- Commune
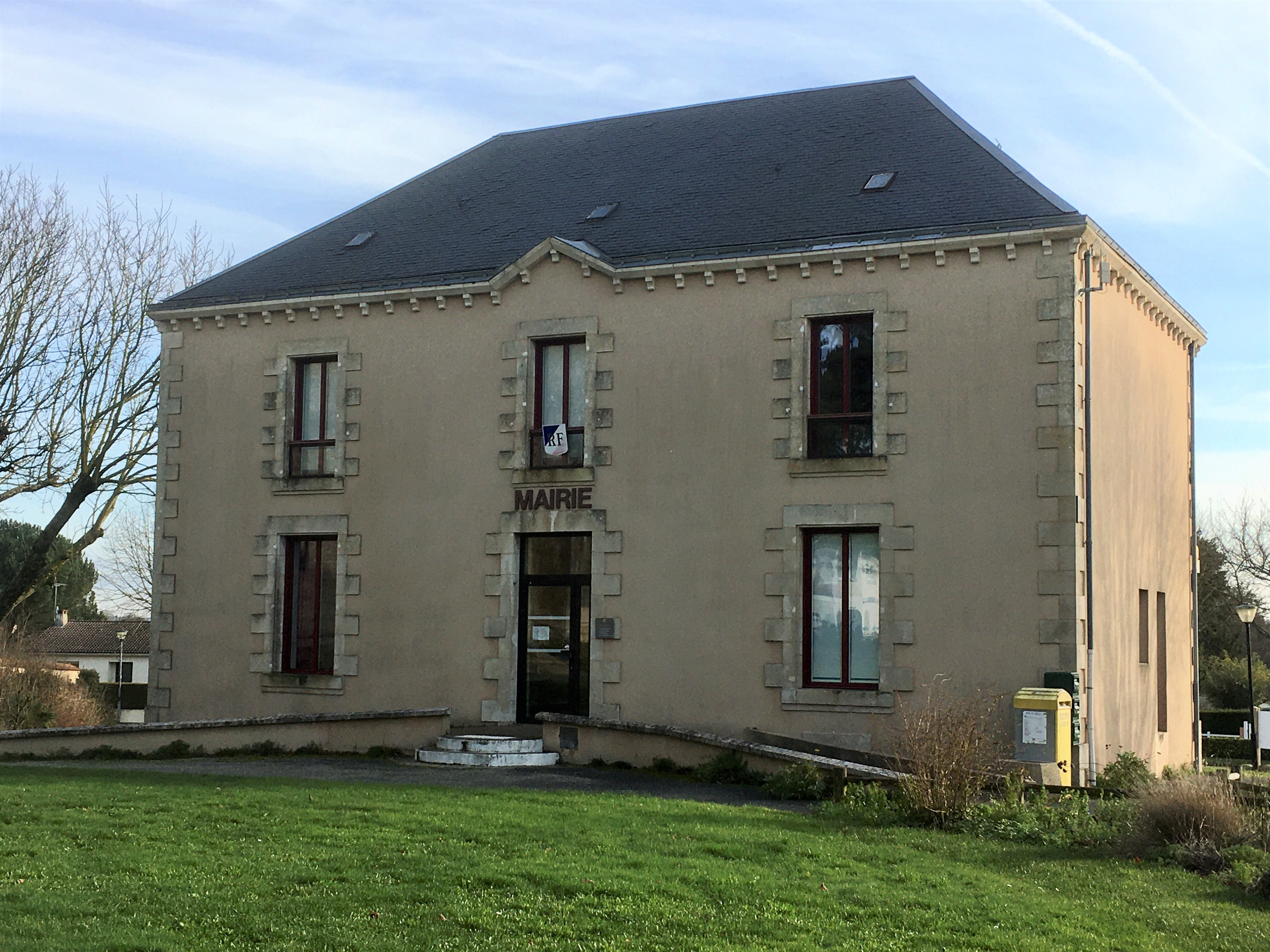
- Town hall of Saint-Mesmin

- Coat of arms
- Location of Saint-Mesmin
- Location within France Location within Pays de la Loire
- Coordinates: 46°47′39″N 0°43′59″W
- Country: France
- Region: Pays de la Loire
- Department: Vendée
- Arrondissement: Fontenay-le-Comte
- Canton: Les Herbiers
- Intercommunality: Pays de Pouzauges

Government
  - Mayor (2020–2026): Anne Roy
- Area^{1}: 26.28 km^{2} (10.15 sq mi)
- Highest elevation: 248 m (814 ft)
- Lowest elevation: 142 m (466 ft)
- Population (2023): 1,774
  - Density: 67.50/km^{2} (174.8/sq mi)
- Demonym(s): Saint-Mesminois(e), Mesminois(e)
- Time zone: UTC+01:00 (CET)
  - Summer (DST): UTC+02:00 (CEST)
- INSEE/Postal code: 85254 /85700
- Website: saintmesmin.fr
- ^{1} French Land Register data, which excludes lakes, ponds, glaciers > 1 km^{2} (0.386 sq mi or 247 acres) and river estuaries.

Saint-Mesmin (French pronunciation: [sɛ̃ mɛmɛ̃]) is a commune in the Vendée department in the Pays de la Loire region in western France.

== Geography ==
This part of the Vendée is in the « High-Bocage » Vendée, close to the western limits of the territory called « Gâtine Vendéenne » in the Deux-Sèvres department. The altitude of the commune ranges from 142 meters to 248 meters, and its area is 2,628 hectares.

== Toponymy ==
Saint-Mesmin takes its name from Saint Maximin of Trier.

== History ==
=== 11th Century ===
In 1179, the names of the churches of Saint-Mesmin-le-Vieux « ecclesiam Sancti Maximini veteris » and Saint-André-sur-Sèvre « ecclesiam Sancte Andree super separim » appear on a list among 127 other churches, possessions confirmed in a papal bull of Pope Alexander III to the abbey of Saint-Jouin-de-Marnes, the Diocese of Poitiers.

=== 13th Century ===
On 10 May 1276, for the first time, mention is made of the De Montfaucon family as lord of Saint-Mesmin, « in the court of Jean de Montefalconis, militis, domini Sancti Maximini » equals to « knight, Lord of St. Mesmin ».

The arms of the family De Montfaulcon are: « Vert a lion of gold ».

The castle was built in the middle of the 13th century; Although the castle has no architectural features of this period, the archaeological samples taken from the foundations are similar to the 13th century.

=== 14th Century ===
==== Hundred Years' War. ====
In 1360, at the beginning of the century of conflict between the Plantagenets and the Capetians, which partly took place in Poitou, Normandy and Aquitaine, during the Hundred Years' War which opposed the English and the French, Jehan de Montfaucon, on March 20, is said knight and lord of the land of Saint-Mesmin, and Le Terrier, in the municipality of Mouilleron-en-Pareds, bailiwick of Vouvant and Mervent.

A royal ordinance of 19 July 1367 prescribed to fortify the strongholds of Poitou.

The castle, which was built in the middle of the 13th century, really stands on this stronghold to consolidate.

Fortification for the war, but also for the purpose of repelling the idle mercenaries, in times of peace, who plunder in the countryside, raping and peddling diseases in organized gangs, waiting to be at the service of a military army. a king who would resume the conflict. Five underground refuges have been inventoried at the so-called places: Purchain, Montboisé, Audrière, La Grossière, La Limouzinière.

In 1370, Pierre de Montfaulcon, knight, married Jeanne de Bazoges. Their daughter, Ide, is the wife of William II d'Appelvoisin, knight of the order of the Tiercelet, lord d'Appelvoisin (Saint-Paul-en-Gâtine, 79) and Bois Chapeleau (La Chapelle-Thireuil, 79) which served in 1385 in the company of Guillaume L'Archeveque, sire of Parthenay.

Following the Order of 1367, Pierre de Montfaucon would have undertaken important fortification work at the castle of Saint-Mesmin, between 1372 and 1375.

=== 16th Century ===
In 1513 - Family Du Plessis de la Bourgognière. Louise de Montfaucon, daughter of Jacques de Montfaucon and Marie de Feschal, married Charles Du Plessis de la Bourgognière.

In 1575 - Family De Vaudrey de Saint-Phal. The seigneury goes through marriage in the family De Vaudrey de Saint-Phal, which will retain until 1650.

=== 17th Century ===
In 1650 - Family Petit de la Guierche. On 7 March 1650 Gilbert Petit, knight, councilor of the king, acquired the land Saint-Mesmin near Georges De Vaudrey de Saint-Phal.

=== 18th Century ===
In 1705 - Hardy Petit de la Guierche is, without a doubt, the origin of the marquisate of the castle.

Alexis-Henry Petit is the only child of Marie and Hardy Petit. In a power of homage that he made to the Chamber of Accounts of Paris in 1717, he declared to possess the Marquisate of Saint-Mesmin.

From 1755, until the French Revolution - Vasselot family. In 1755, Alexis-Françoise Petit married Messire Jacques-Rene-Francois-Marie de Vasselot, knight and lord, marquess dAnne-Marie.

==== War in the Vendée ====
In 1793, during the war in the Vendée: passage of the Infernal Columns to the castle of Saint-Mesmin; a courier from Parthenay announces that the enemy, the Republicans nicknamed the blues, surrounds Chataignieraie, then this army of the revolution seizes Reaumur, Montournay, Mouilleron, Chavaigne, Tillais and Saint-Mesmin. The castle burned, only an old lady de Vasselot who occupied during the Revolution is killed.

In January 1794, a detachment of the Infernal Columns under the orders of Brisset, burned the castle.

Again, on 20 February 1796, a fight between the Republican armies and the Vendeans took place in Saint-Mesmin and in the castle of Saint-Mesmin. About forty Vendéens led by Louis Péault, sergeant, gamekeeper of the Marquisate of Saint-Mesmin, attack a Republican detachment comprising 250 men commanded by Adjutant General Cortez. Following a counterattack, Cortez tries to surround the Vendeans who retreat to the castle of Saint-Mesmin where they lock themselves to resist.

From 21 to 24 February, the assaults of the Republican troops are without conclusive results. But for lack of food, the Vendeans agree to surrender. They are promised lives saved. The forty or so Vendeans were taken to la Chataigneraie, where the chief of staff ordered Bonnaire to assemble a military council to try them and shoot them, despite the promise of life saved.

General Hoche, commander-in-chief of the Western troops, warned of the incident, demanded and obtained from his subordinates the respect of the terms of the surrender. The Vendeans were then directed to Fontenay-le-Comte, then to Noirmoutier where they remained until the end of the war.

== Places and monuments ==
- Castle of Saint-Mesmin at the foot of which flows the river the Sevreau, less than 2 kilometers (1.2 miles) from Saint-Mesmin, is located on the town of Saint-André-sur-Sèvre. It is an old medieval fortress of the 14th century, equipped with a dungeon 28 meters high, built in the 15th century. The castle is open to the public in summer and medieval events are organized.
- Church Saint-Maximin.

== Personalities related to the town ==
- Joseph Amand de Vasselot (1762-1796), naval officer during the American Revolutionary War, second in command of the National Guard of Chatellerault, Vendée general
- Georges Simenon lived between 1942 and 1943 in Saint-Mesmin (avenue des Monts). There he wrote Inspector Cadaver.

== See also ==
- Communes of the Vendée department
