= Vendée (river) =

River in western France

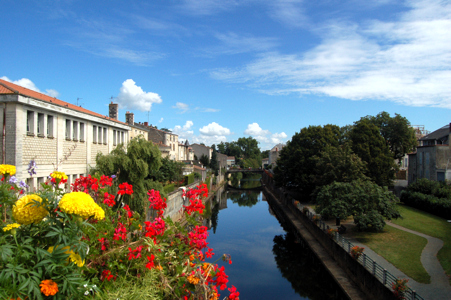

- Location within France Location within Nouvelle-Aquitaine

Location
- Country: France

Physical characteristics
- Source
  - location: Deux-Sèvres
  - elevation: 206 m (676 ft)
- Mouth
  - location: Sèvre Niortaise
  - coordinates: 46°19′21″N 0°57′47″W
- Length: 82.5 km (51.3 mi)
- Basin size: 675 km^{2} (261 sq mi)

Basin features
- Progression: Sèvre Niortaise→ Atlantic Ocean

The Vendée (US: /vɒ̃ˈdeɪ/, French: [vɑ̃de]; Occitan: Vendèa) is an 82.5-kilometre-long (51.3 mi) river in the Nouvelle-Aquitaine and Pays de la Loire regions in western France. It a right tributary of the Sèvre Niortaise.

Its source is near L'Absie, in the west of the Deux-Sèvres department. For a few kilometres, it forms the border between the departments of Vendée (named after the river) and Charente-Maritime, before it flows into the Sèvre Niortaise, near Marans.

The name is attested as Fluvium Vendre in the 10th century, and as Flumen Vendee and Vendeia by the 11th century. According to Pierre-Henri Billy, the name ultimately derives from the Celtic toponym *vindo- meaning white or brilliant in a sacred context (as in the Modern Welsh gwyn/wyn). The name likely originates in Proto-Celtic or Gaulish, but may also have originated in the Gallo or Old Breton languages.

It flows through the following departments and towns:

- Deux-Sèvres: Saint-Paul-en-Gâtine
- Vendée: Mervent, Fontenay-le-Comte, Velluire, L'Île-d'Elle
- Charente-Maritime
