= Pastellière castle =

16th century castle in France

- Château de la Pastellière
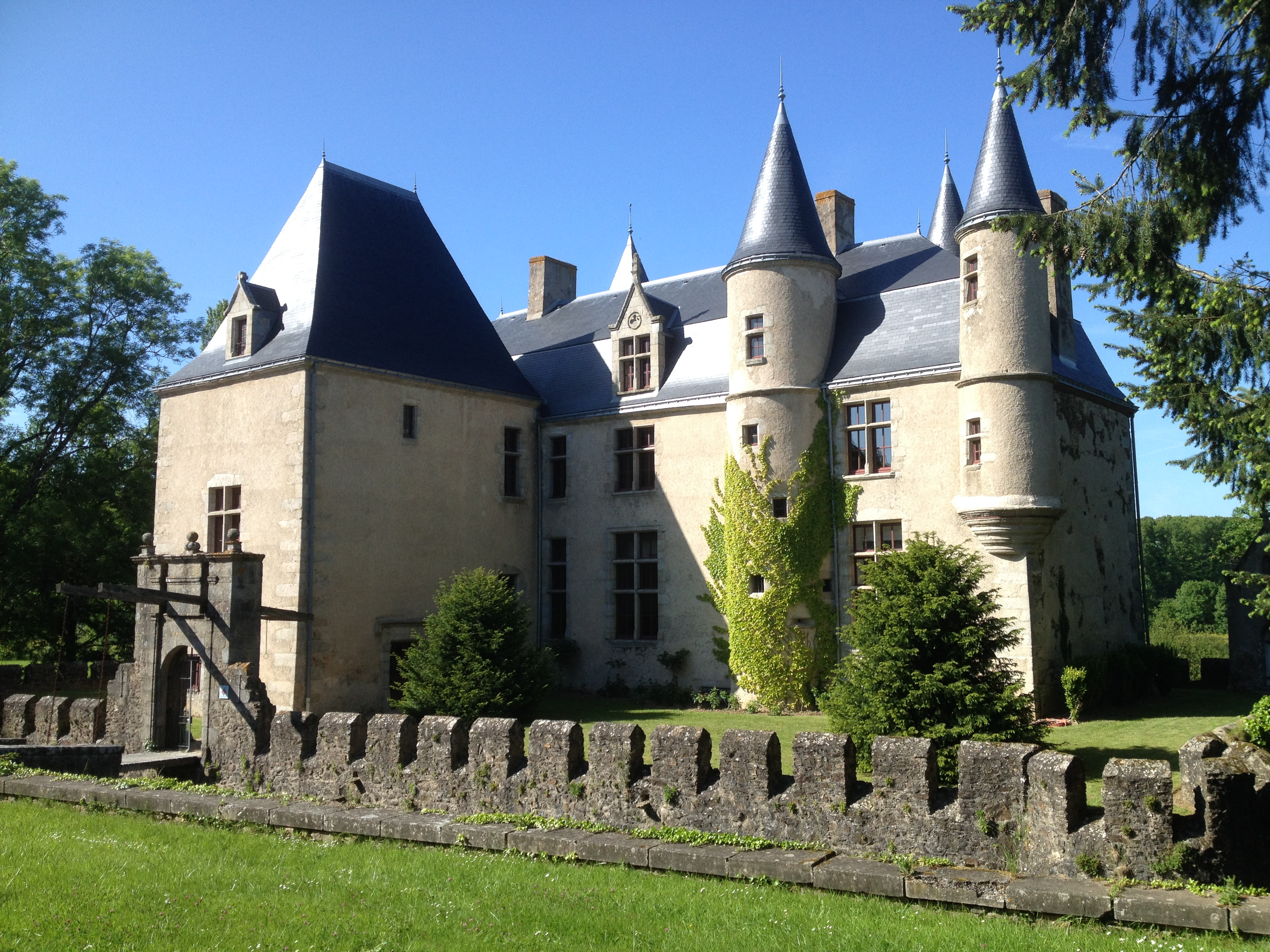
- Pastellière castle in 2015
- Interactive map of the Pastellière castle area

General information
- Location: Deux-Sèvres, Combrand, France
- Coordinates: 46.853145°N 0.676651°W

Pastellière castle (French: Château de la Pastellière), is a late 15th/early 16th century castle situated in Combrand, Deux-Sèvres. The caste has been given special protection and registered at the Inventaire supplémentaire des monuments historiques in 1988.

== History ==
Construction of the castle began in the late 15th century and the early 16th century. In 1641, the castle still belonged to the La Pastellière family.

In October 1704, the castle was purchased by Charles Durant (son of Philippe Durant, Seigneur of the Touche, and Janne Merlet), a weaving merchant from Bressuire, who bought, for 4,000 pounds, the position of mayor of Bressuire for life in 1703. The Durant family then added the lordship name to their name and took the name of Durant de La Pastellière.

In 1793, during the War in the Vendée, the castle served as a military hospital for wounded Vandéians. In 1794 the second divisions of the infernal columns under the command of general Louis Grignon tried, but failed, to burn down the castle.

In 1889, the castle transferred to the Savary de Beauregard family.

In 1953, the castle was fragmented. It was then sold to the Catta family (Tony Catta), friends of the Durant de La Pastellière family. If it weren't for the Catta family, the castle would have been torn down.

The castle sold in 2003 to Foncier SA. Since its acquisition, the castle was renovated resuming its historical style.

== Inventaire des monuments historiques registration ==
The facades, rooftop, the stairs & staircase (inside), the moat, corner towers, as well as the bridge that spans the moat, are all protected by the Inventaire supplémentaire des monuments historiques which granted them protection on 7 March 1988.
