= Les Velluire-sur-Vendée =

- Commune
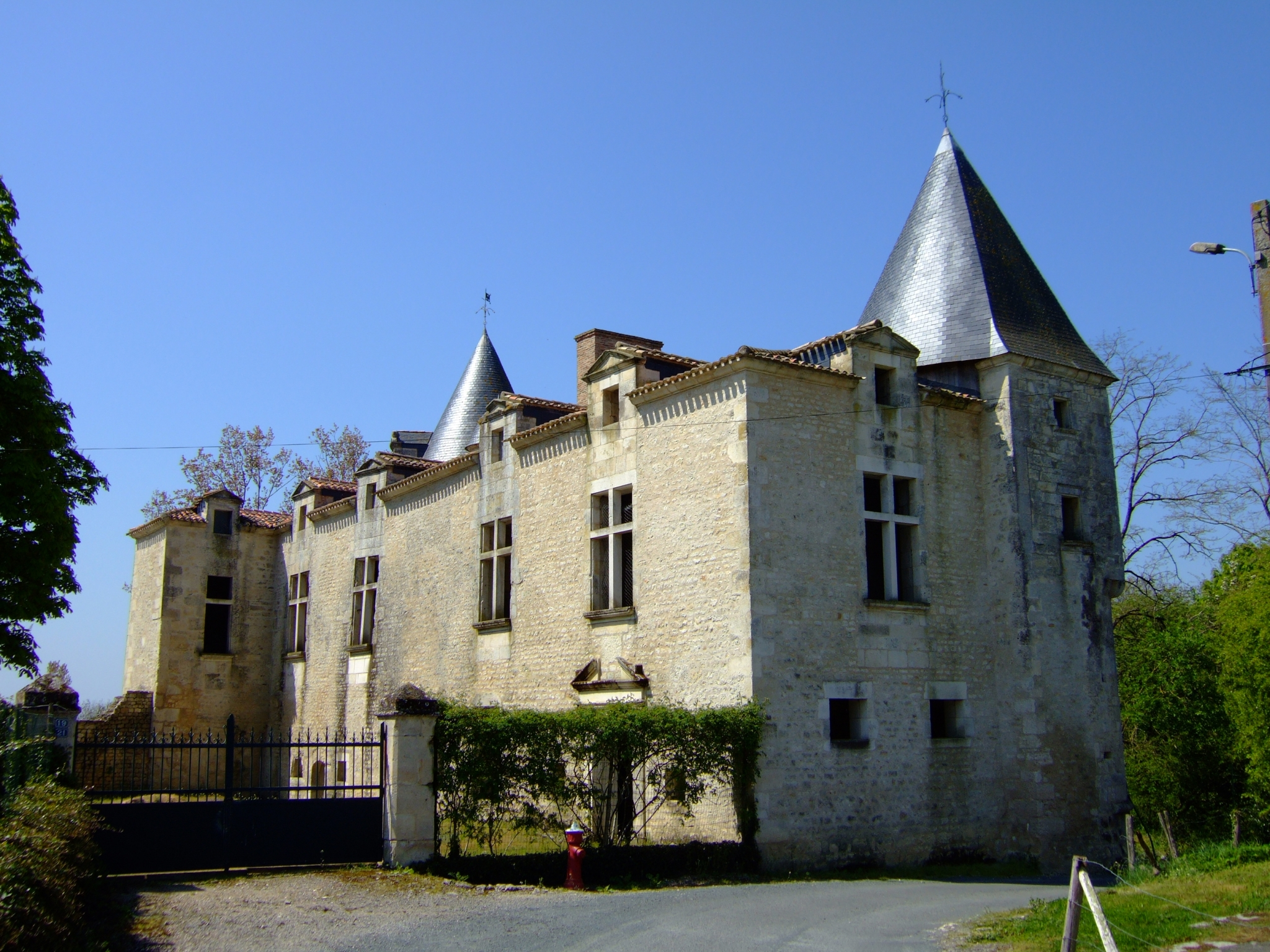
- Château de Chastellier-Barlot

- Coat of arms
- Location of Les Velluire-sur-Vendée
- Location within France Location within Pays de la Loire
- Coordinates: 46°24′43″N 0°53′41″W
- Country: France
- Region: Pays de la Loire
- Department: Vendée
- Arrondissement: Fontenay-le-Comte
- Canton: Fontenay-le-Comte
- Intercommunality: Pays de Fontenay-Vendée

Government
  - Mayor (2020–2026): Laurent Dupas
- Area^{1}: 26.60 km^{2} (10.27 sq mi)
- Highest elevation: 42 m (138 ft)
- Lowest elevation: 0 m (0 ft)
- Population (2023): 1,358
  - Density: 51.05/km^{2} (132.2/sq mi)
- Time zone: UTC+01:00 (CET)
  - Summer (DST): UTC+02:00 (CEST)
- INSEE/Postal code: 85177 /85770
- ^{1} French Land Register data, which excludes lakes, ponds, glaciers > 1 km^{2} (0.386 sq mi or 247 acres) and river estuaries.

Les Velluire-sur-Vendée (French pronunciation: [le vɛlɥiʁ syʁ vɑ̃de], literally Les Velluire on Vendée) is a commune in the Vendée department in the Pays de la Loire region in western France. It was established on 1 January 2019 by merger of the former communes of Le Poiré-sur-Velluire (the seat) and Velluire.

== See also ==
- Communes of the Vendée department
