= Le Poiré-sur-Velluire =

- Part of Les Velluire-sur-Vendée
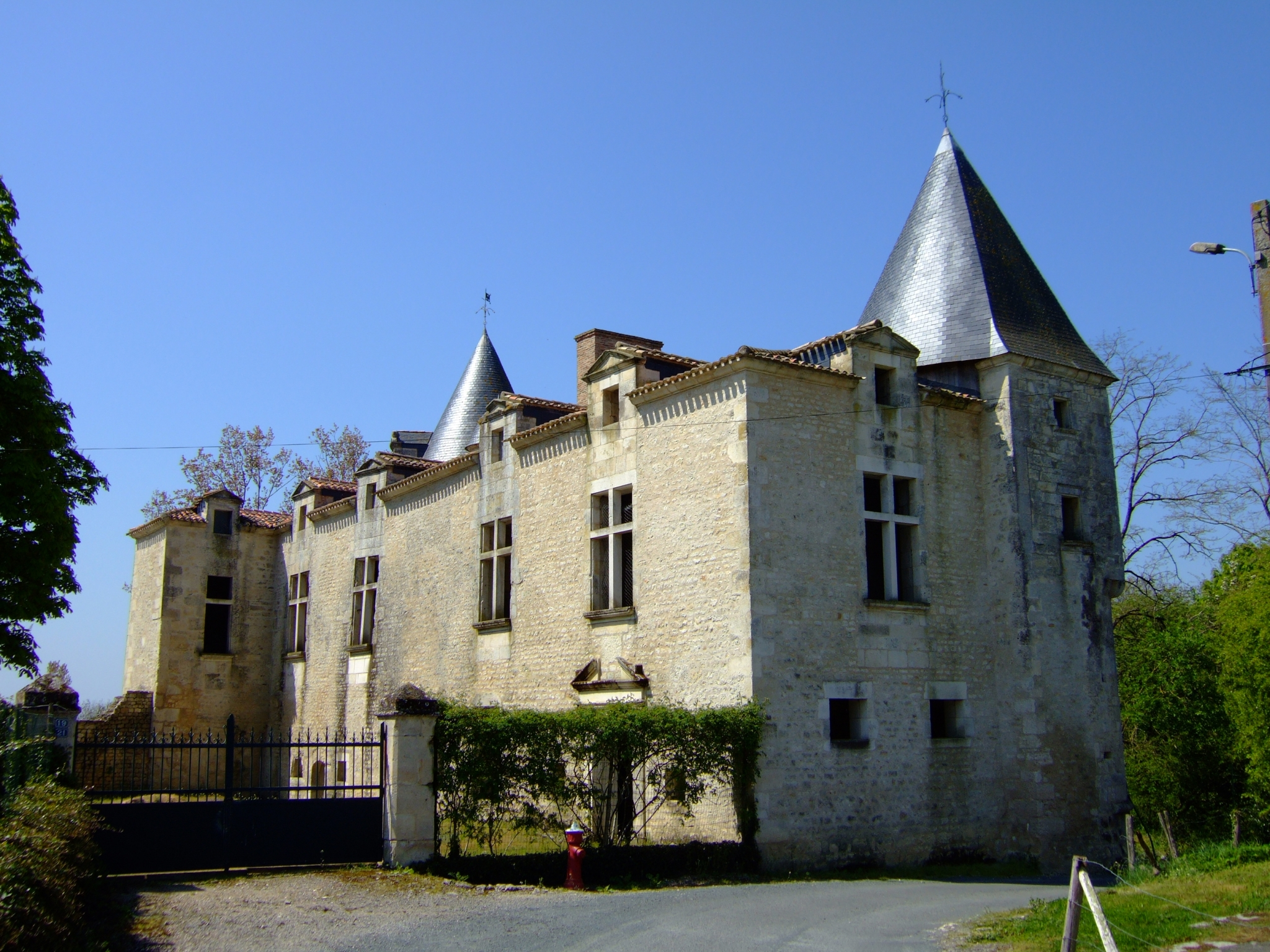
- Château de Chastellier-Barlot

- Coat of arms
- Location of Le Poiré-sur-Velluire
- Location within France Location within Pays de la Loire
- Coordinates: 46°24′43″N 0°53′41″W
- Country: France
- Region: Pays de la Loire
- Department: Vendée
- Arrondissement: Fontenay-le-Comte
- Canton: Fontenay-le-Comte
- Commune: Les Velluire-sur-Vendée
- Area^{1}: 16.95 km^{2} (6.54 sq mi)
- Highest elevation: 42 m (138 ft)
- Lowest elevation: 1 m (3.3 ft)
- Population (2022): 665
  - Density: 39.2/km^{2} (102/sq mi)
- Time zone: UTC+01:00 (CET)
  - Summer (DST): UTC+02:00 (CEST)
- Postal code: 85770
- ^{1} French Land Register data, which excludes lakes, ponds, glaciers > 1 km^{2} (0.386 sq mi or 247 acres) and river estuaries.

Le Poiré-sur-Velluire (French pronunciation: [lə pwaʁe syʁ vɛlɥiʁ], literally Le Poiré on Velluire) is a former commune in the Vendée department in the Pays de la Loire region in western France. On 1 January 2019, it was merged into the new commune Les Velluire-sur-Vendée.

== See also ==
- Communes of the Vendée department
