= Moncoutant =

Commune in Deux-Sèvres, France

- Part of Moncoutant-sur-Sèvre
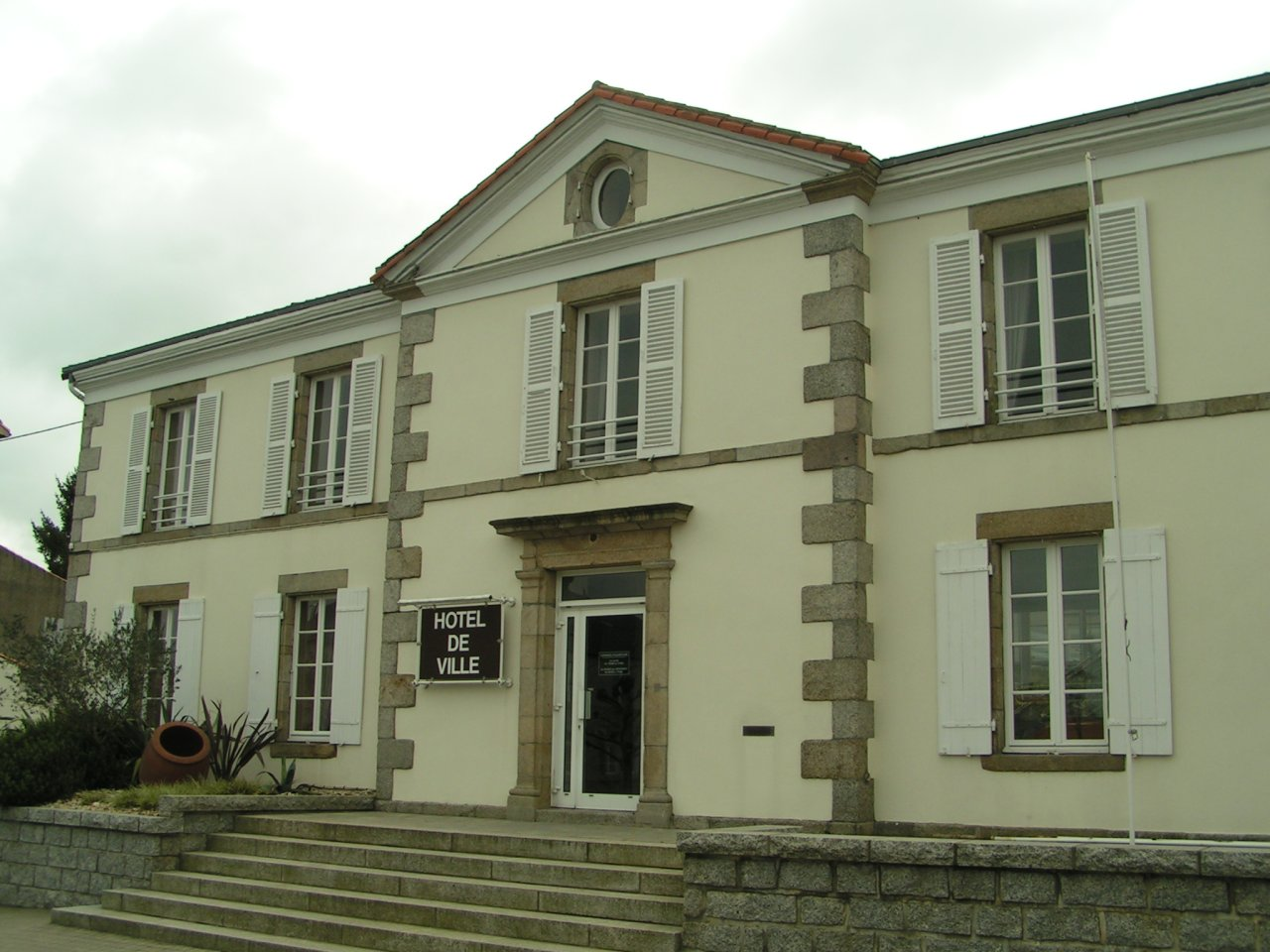
- The town hall in Moncoutant
- Location of Moncoutant
- Location within France Location within Nouvelle-Aquitaine
- Coordinates: 46°43′28″N 0°35′15″W
- Country: France
- Region: Nouvelle-Aquitaine
- Department: Deux-Sèvres
- Arrondissement: Bressuire
- Canton: Cerizay
- Commune: Moncoutant-sur-Sèvre
- Area^{1}: 26.32 km^{2} (10.16 sq mi)
- Elevation: 180 m (590 ft)
- Highest elevation: 226 m (741 ft)
- Lowest elevation: 153 m (502 ft)
- Population (2022): 3,223
  - Density: 122.5/km^{2} (317.2/sq mi)
- Time zone: UTC+01:00 (CET)
  - Summer (DST): UTC+02:00 (CEST)
- Postal code: 79320
- ^{1} French Land Register data, which excludes lakes, ponds, glaciers > 1 km^{2} (0.386 sq mi or 247 acres) and river estuaries.

Moncoutant (French pronunciation: [mɔ̃kutɑ̃]) is a former commune in the Deux-Sèvres department in western France. On 1 January 2019, it was merged into the new commune Moncoutant-sur-Sèvre.

== Geography ==
Moncoutant is located in a bocage area in northern Deux-Sèvres, on the Sèvre Nantaise, 50 km north of Niort and 15 km south of Bressuire.

== Economy ==
Moncoutant is a mainly agricultural town. However, it also has numerous shops and a few industries. Since 2001, it has also become a tourist center, thanks to the opening of the fishing holiday center

== See also ==
- Communes of the Deux-Sèvres department
