= Saint-Jouin-de-Milly =

- Part of Moncoutant-sur-Sèvre
- Location of Saint-Jouin-de-Milly
- Location within France Location within Nouvelle-Aquitaine
- Coordinates: 46°45′19″N 0°37′11″W
- Country: France
- Region: Nouvelle-Aquitaine
- Department: Deux-Sèvres
- Arrondissement: Bressuire
- Canton: Cerizay
- Commune: Moncoutant-sur-Sèvre
- Area^{1}: 6.77 km^{2} (2.61 sq mi)
- Elevation: 190 m (620 ft)
- Highest elevation: 195 m (640 ft)
- Lowest elevation: 153 m (502 ft)
- Population (2022): 198
  - Density: 29.2/km^{2} (75.7/sq mi)
- Time zone: UTC+01:00 (CET)
  - Summer (DST): UTC+02:00 (CEST)
- Postal code: 79380
- ^{1} French Land Register data, which excludes lakes, ponds, glaciers > 1 km^{2} (0.386 sq mi or 247 acres) and river estuaries.

Saint-Jouin-de-Milly is a former commune in the Deux-Sèvres department in western France. On 1 January 2019, it was merged into the new commune Moncoutant-sur-Sèvre.

== See also ==
- Communes of the Deux-Sèvres department
