= Saint-André-sur-Sèvre =

- Commune
- Location of Saint-André-sur-Sèvre
- Location within France Location within Nouvelle-Aquitaine
- Coordinates: 46°47′03″N 0°40′39″W
- Country: France
- Region: Nouvelle-Aquitaine
- Department: Deux-Sèvres
- Arrondissement: Bressuire
- Canton: Cerizay
- Intercommunality: CA Bocage Bressuirais

Government
  - Mayor (2020–2026): Dany Grellier
- Area^{1}: 19.85 km^{2} (7.66 sq mi)
- Elevation: 179 m (587 ft)
- Highest elevation: 212 m (696 ft)
- Lowest elevation: 146 m (479 ft)
- Population (2023): 637
  - Density: 32.1/km^{2} (83.1/sq mi)
- Time zone: UTC+01:00 (CET)
  - Summer (DST): UTC+02:00 (CEST)
- INSEE/Postal code: 79236 /79380
- ^{1} French Land Register data, which excludes lakes, ponds, glaciers > 1 km^{2} (0.386 sq mi or 247 acres) and river estuaries.

Saint-André-sur-Sèvre is a commune located northwest of the Deux-Sèvres department, in western France.

== Geography ==
This territory is called « Gâtine », and close to the limits of the Vendée in the « High-Bocage » Vendée.

The elevation ranges from 146 meters to 212 meters on the granite massif of the municipality, the average elevation is 179 meters.

The municipality's municipal area covers 1,985 hectares.

== History ==
=== Hundred Years' War ===
The conflict between the Plantagenets and the Capetians, which opposed the English and the French, partly took place in Poitou, Normandy and Aquitaine.

=== War in the Vendée ===
In 1793, during the war in the Vendée: passage of the Infernal Columns to the castle of Saint-Mesmin; a courier from Parthenay announces that the enemy, the Republicans nicknamed the blues, surrounds Chataignieraie, then this army of the revolution seizes Reaumur, Montournay, Mouilleron, Chavaigne, Tillais and Saint-Mesmin.

== Places and monuments ==
- Castle of Saint-Mesmin at the foot of which flows the river the Sevreau, less than 2 kilometers (1,2 miles) from Saint-Mesmin, is located on the town of Saint-André-sur-Sèvre. It is an old medieval fortress of the 13th century, equipped with a dungeon 28 meters high, built in the 15th century. The castle is open to the public in summer and medieval events are organized.
- A Cloister garden, the river Sevre, a church of the thirteenth century.

== See also ==
- Communes of the Deux-Sèvres department
