= Trayes =

- Commune
- Location of Trayes
- Location within France Location within Nouvelle-Aquitaine
- Coordinates: 46°41′14″N 0°28′34″W
- Country: France
- Region: Nouvelle-Aquitaine
- Department: Deux-Sèvres
- Arrondissement: Bressuire
- Canton: Cerizay
- Intercommunality: CA Bocage Bressuirais

Government
  - Mayor (2020–2026): Bernard Cartier
- Area^{1}: 7.20 km^{2} (2.78 sq mi)
- Elevation: 200 m (660 ft)
- Highest elevation: 212 m (696 ft)
- Lowest elevation: 179 m (587 ft)
- Population (2023): 111
  - Density: 15.4/km^{2} (39.9/sq mi)
- Time zone: UTC+01:00 (CET)
  - Summer (DST): UTC+02:00 (CEST)
- INSEE/Postal code: 79332 /79240
- ^{1} French Land Register data, which excludes lakes, ponds, glaciers > 1 km^{2} (0.386 sq mi or 247 acres) and river estuaries.

Trayes is a commune in the Deux-Sèvres department in western France.

== See also ==
- Communes of the Deux-Sèvres department
