= Le Pin, Deux-Sèvres =

Le Pin
- Commune
- Coat of arms
- Location of Le Pin
- Location within France Location within Nouvelle-Aquitaine
- Coordinates: 46°51′43″N 0°39′10″W
- Country: France
- Region: Nouvelle-Aquitaine
- Department: Deux-Sèvres
- Arrondissement: Bressuire
- Canton: Cerizay
- Intercommunality: CA Bocage Bressuirais

Government
  - Mayor (2020–2026): Philippe Audureau
- Area^{1}: 19.09 km^{2} (7.37 sq mi)
- Elevation: 150 m (490 ft)
- Highest elevation: 232 m (761 ft)
- Lowest elevation: 117 m (384 ft)
- Population (2023): 1,091
  - Density: 57.15/km^{2} (148.0/sq mi)
- Time zone: UTC+01:00 (CET)
  - Summer (DST): UTC+02:00 (CEST)
- INSEE/Postal code: 79210 /79140
- ^{1} French Land Register data, which excludes lakes, ponds, glaciers > 1 km^{2} (0.386 sq mi or 247 acres) and river estuaries.

Le Pin (French pronunciation: [lə pɛ̃]) is a commune in the Deux-Sèvres department in western France.

== See also ==
- Communes of the Deux-Sèvres department
