= La Chapelle-Saint-Laurent =

- Commune
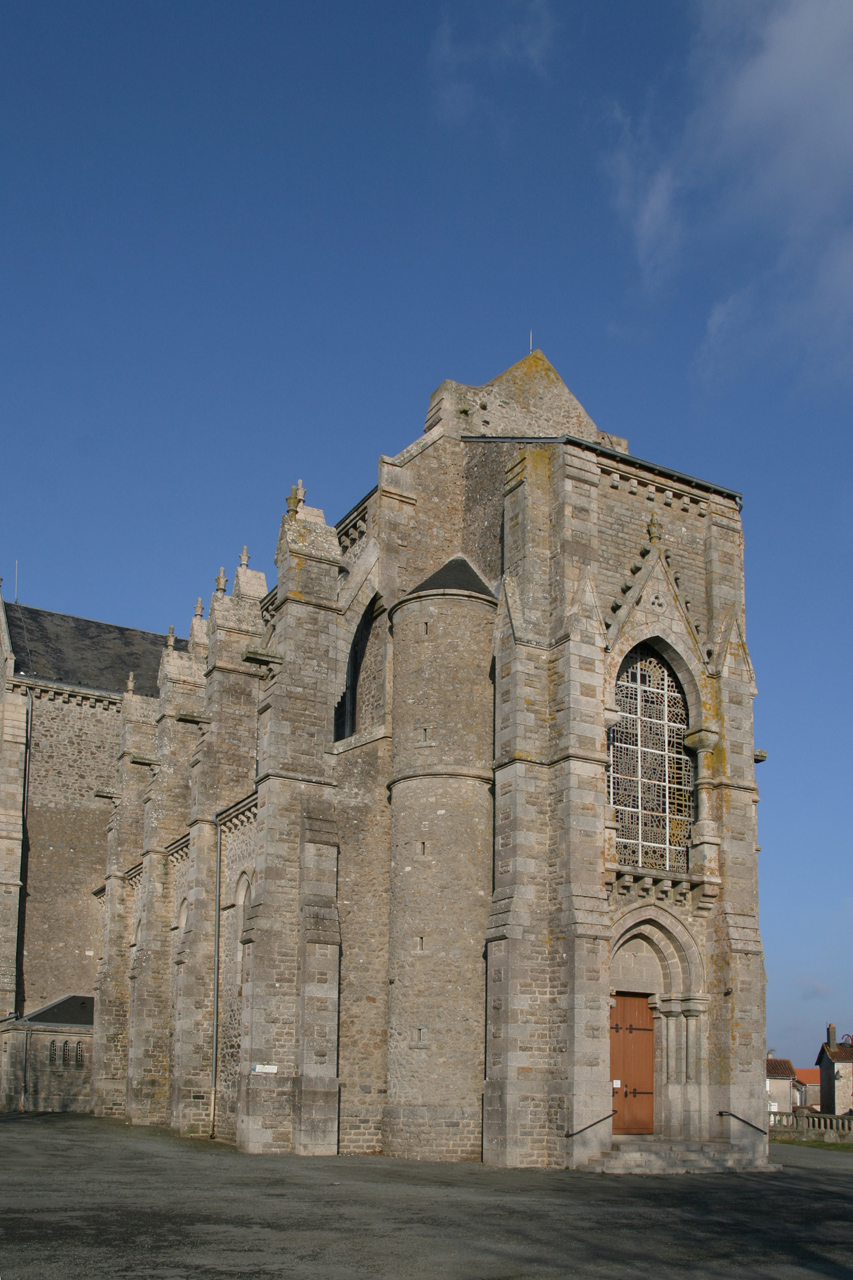
- The church in La Chapelle-Saint-Laurent
- Location of La Chapelle-Saint-Laurent
- Location within France Location within Nouvelle-Aquitaine
- Coordinates: 46°44′47″N 0°28′32″W
- Country: France
- Region: Nouvelle-Aquitaine
- Department: Deux-Sèvres
- Arrondissement: Bressuire
- Canton: Cerizay
- Intercommunality: CA Bocage Bressuirais

Government
  - Mayor (2020–2026): Jean-Yves Bilheu
- Area^{1}: 28.85 km^{2} (11.14 sq mi)
- Elevation: 182 m (597 ft)
- Highest elevation: 235 m (771 ft)
- Lowest elevation: 149 m (489 ft)
- Population (2023): 2,054
  - Density: 71.20/km^{2} (184.4/sq mi)
- Time zone: UTC+01:00 (CET)
  - Summer (DST): UTC+02:00 (CEST)
- INSEE/Postal code: 79076 /79430
- ^{1} French Land Register data, which excludes lakes, ponds, glaciers > 1 km^{2} (0.386 sq mi or 247 acres) and river estuaries.

La Chapelle-Saint-Laurent (French pronunciation: [la ʃapɛl sɛ̃ loʁɑ̃]) is a commune in the Deux-Sèvres department in the Nouvelle-Aquitaine region in western France.

== Population ==
Historical population
Year	Pop.	±% p.a.
1968	1,561	—
1975	1,605	+0.40%
1982	1,682	+0.67%
1990	1,749	+0.49%
1999	1,697	−0.33%
2007	1,870	+1.22%
2012	1,900	+0.32%
2017	2,002	+1.05%
2023	2,054	+0.43%
Source: INSEE

== See also ==
- Communes of the Deux-Sèvres department
