= Moncoutant-sur-Sèvre =

- Commune
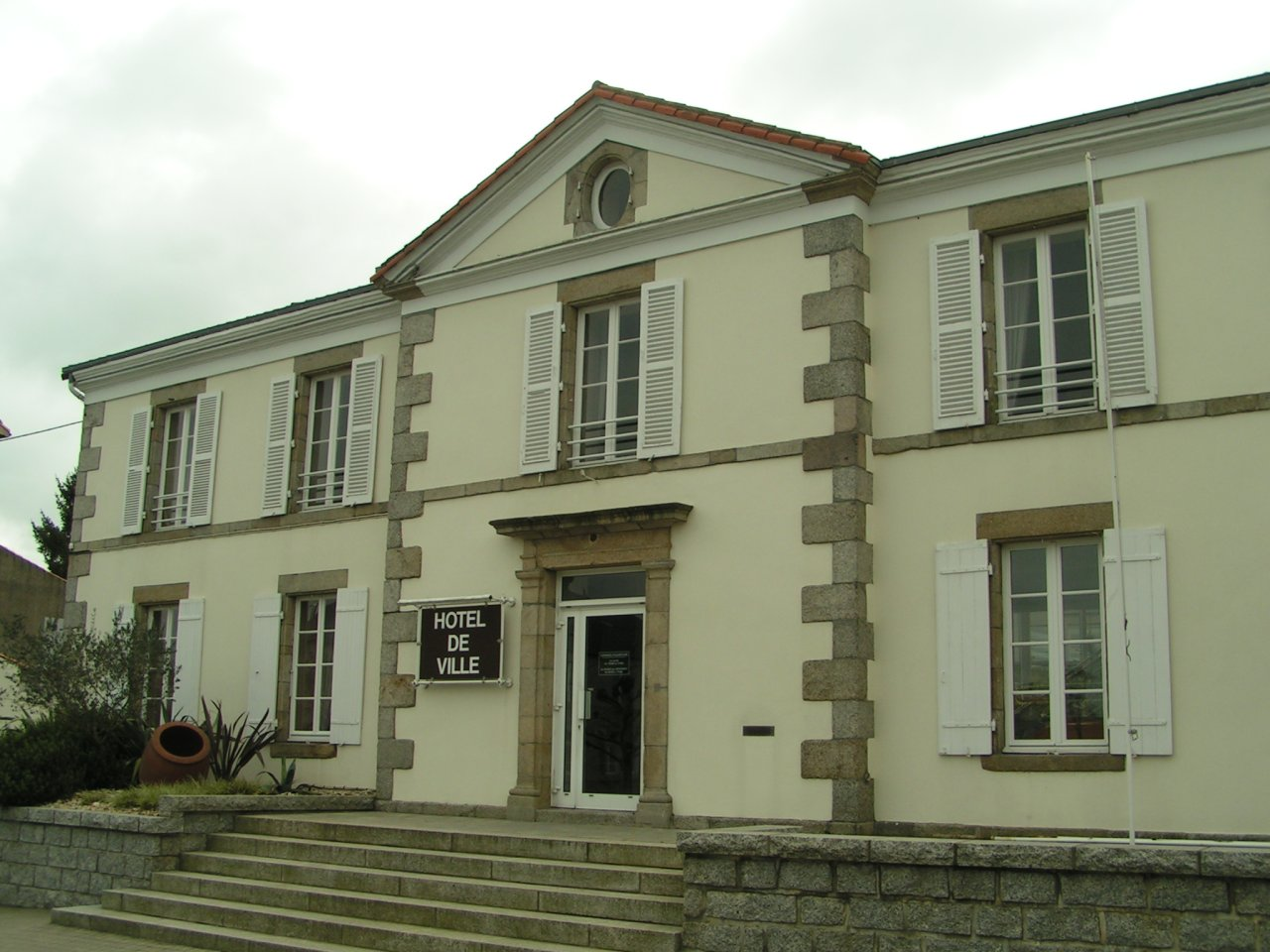
- The town hall in Moncoutant
- Location of Moncoutant-sur-Sèvre
- Location within France Location within Nouvelle-Aquitaine
- Coordinates: 46°43′28″N 0°35′15″W
- Country: France
- Region: Nouvelle-Aquitaine
- Department: Deux-Sèvres
- Arrondissement: Bressuire
- Canton: Cerizay
- Intercommunality: CA Bocage Bressuirais

Government
  - Mayor (2020–2026): Roland Moreau
- Area^{1}: 92.78 km^{2} (35.82 sq mi)
- Highest elevation: 247 m (810 ft)
- Lowest elevation: 153 m (502 ft)
- Population (2023): 5,121
  - Density: 55.20/km^{2} (143.0/sq mi)
- Time zone: UTC+01:00 (CET)
  - Summer (DST): UTC+02:00 (CEST)
- INSEE/Postal code: 79179 /79320
- ^{1} French Land Register data, which excludes lakes, ponds, glaciers > 1 km^{2} (0.386 sq mi or 247 acres) and river estuaries.

Moncoutant-sur-Sèvre (French pronunciation: [mɔ̃kutɑ̃ syʁ sɛvʁ], literally Moncoutant on Sèvre) is a commune in the Deux-Sèvres department in western France.

It was established on 1 January 2019 by merger of the former communes of Moncoutant (the seat), Le Breuil-Bernard, La Chapelle-Saint-Étienne, Moutiers-sous-Chantemerle, Pugny and Saint-Jouin-de-Milly.

== Population ==
Population data refer to the area corresponding with the commune as of January 2025.

Historical population
Year	Pop.	±% p.a.
1968	4,953	—
1975	4,933	−0.06%
1982	5,001	+0.20%
1990	5,096	+0.24%
1999	4,852	−0.54%
2007	4,874	+0.06%
2012	5,018	+0.58%
2017	5,046	+0.11%
2023	5,121	+0.25%
Source: INSEE

== See also ==
- Communes of the Deux-Sèvres department
