= Saint-Pierre-des-Échaubrognes =

- Commune
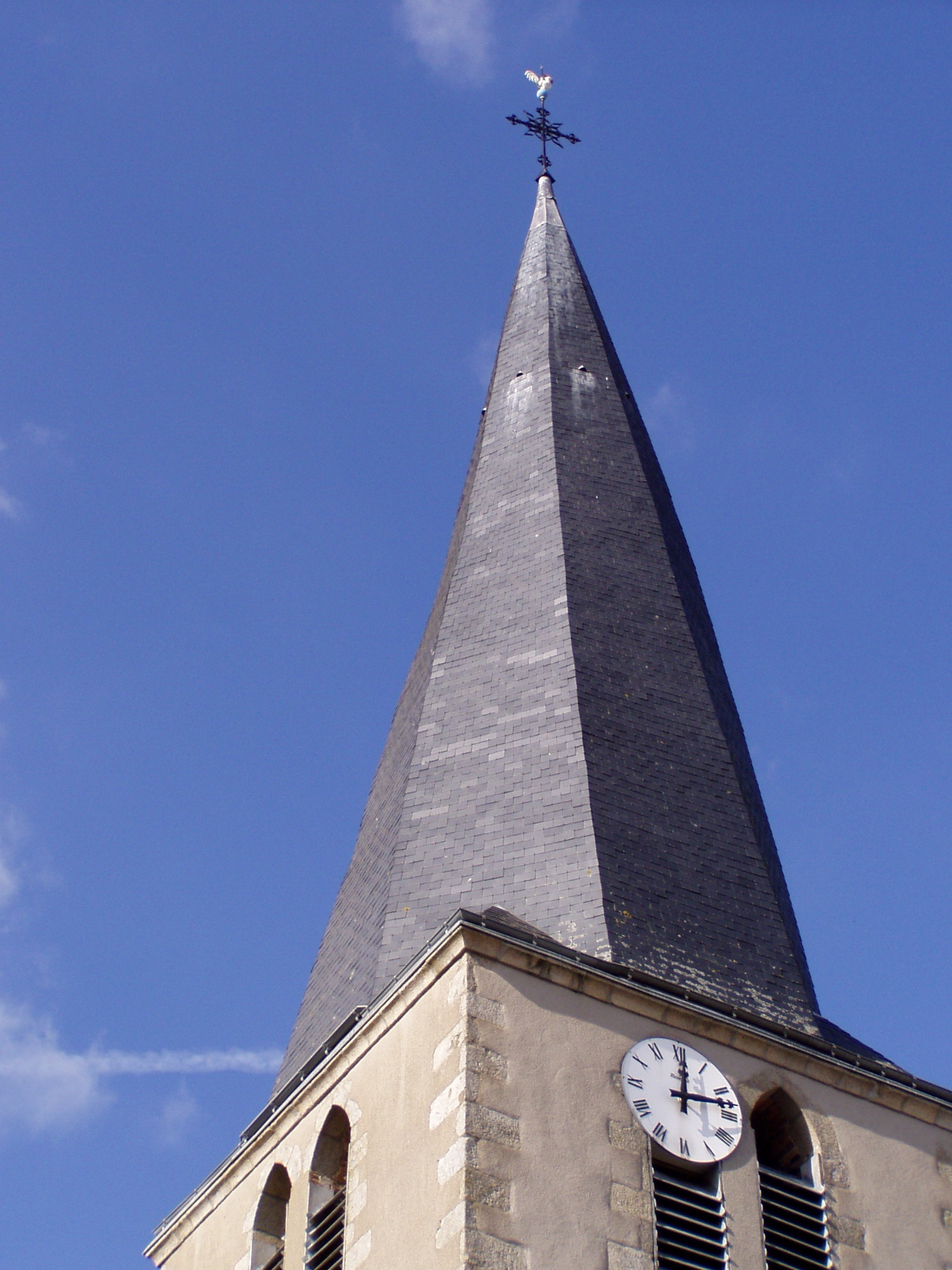
- The church tower
- Location of Saint-Pierre-des-Échaubrognes
- Location within France Location within Nouvelle-Aquitaine
- Coordinates: 46°59′25″N 0°44′35″W
- Country: France
- Region: Nouvelle-Aquitaine
- Department: Deux-Sèvres
- Arrondissement: Bressuire
- Canton: Mauléon
- Intercommunality: CA Bocage Bressuirais

Government
  - Mayor (2020–2026): Claude Pousin
- Area^{1}: 28.92 km^{2} (11.17 sq mi)
- Elevation: 137 m (449 ft)
- Highest elevation: 195 m (640 ft)
- Lowest elevation: 102 m (335 ft)
- Population (2023): 1,384
  - Density: 47.86/km^{2} (123.9/sq mi)
- Time zone: UTC+01:00 (CET)
  - Summer (DST): UTC+02:00 (CEST)
- INSEE/Postal code: 79289 /79700
- ^{1} French Land Register data, which excludes lakes, ponds, glaciers > 1 km^{2} (0.386 sq mi or 247 acres) and river estuaries.

Saint-Pierre-des-Échaubrognes (French pronunciation: [sɛ̃ pjɛʁ de.z‿eʃobʁɔɲ]) is a commune in the Deux-Sèvres department in western France.

== See also ==
- Communes of the Deux-Sèvres department
