= Bretignolles =

- Commune
- Location of Bretignolles
- Location within France Location within Nouvelle-Aquitaine
- Coordinates: 46°51′50″N 0°36′19″W
- Country: France
- Region: Nouvelle-Aquitaine
- Department: Deux-Sèvres
- Arrondissement: Bressuire
- Canton: Cerizay
- Intercommunality: CA Bocage Bressuirais

Government
  - Mayor (2020–2026): Vincent Marot
- Area^{1}: 13.16 km^{2} (5.08 sq mi)
- Elevation: 230 m (750 ft)
- Highest elevation: 237 m (778 ft)
- Lowest elevation: 150 m (490 ft)
- Population (2023): 592
  - Density: 45.0/km^{2} (117/sq mi)
- Time zone: UTC+01:00 (CET)
  - Summer (DST): UTC+02:00 (CEST)
- INSEE/Postal code: 79050 /79140
- ^{1} French Land Register data, which excludes lakes, ponds, glaciers > 1 km^{2} (0.386 sq mi or 247 acres) and river estuaries.

Bretignolles is a commune in the Deux-Sèvres department in the Nouvelle-Aquitaine region in western France.

== See also ==
- Communes of the Deux-Sèvres department
