= Saint-Amand-sur-Sèvre =

- Commune
- Location of Saint-Amand-sur-Sèvre
- Location within France Location within Nouvelle-Aquitaine
- Coordinates: 46°52′10″N 0°47′38″W
- Country: France
- Region: Nouvelle-Aquitaine
- Department: Deux-Sèvres
- Arrondissement: Bressuire
- Canton: Mauléon
- Intercommunality: CA Bocage Bressuirais

Government
  - Mayor (2020–2026): Sylvie Bazantay
- Area^{1}: 32.36 km^{2} (12.49 sq mi)
- Elevation: 187 m (614 ft)
- Highest elevation: 212 m (696 ft)
- Lowest elevation: 137 m (449 ft)
- Population (2023): 1,422
  - Density: 43.94/km^{2} (113.8/sq mi)
- Time zone: UTC+01:00 (CET)
  - Summer (DST): UTC+02:00 (CEST)
- INSEE/Postal code: 79235 /79700
- ^{1} French Land Register data, which excludes lakes, ponds, glaciers > 1 km^{2} (0.386 sq mi or 247 acres) and river estuaries.

Saint-Amand-sur-Sèvre (French pronunciation: [sɛ̃.t‿amɑ̃ syʁ sɛvʁ], literally Saint-Amand on Sèvre) is a commune in the Deux-Sèvres department in western France. Between 1973 and 1992 it was part of the commune Mauléon.

== See also ==
- Communes of the Deux-Sèvres department
