= Nueil-les-Aubiers =

- Commune
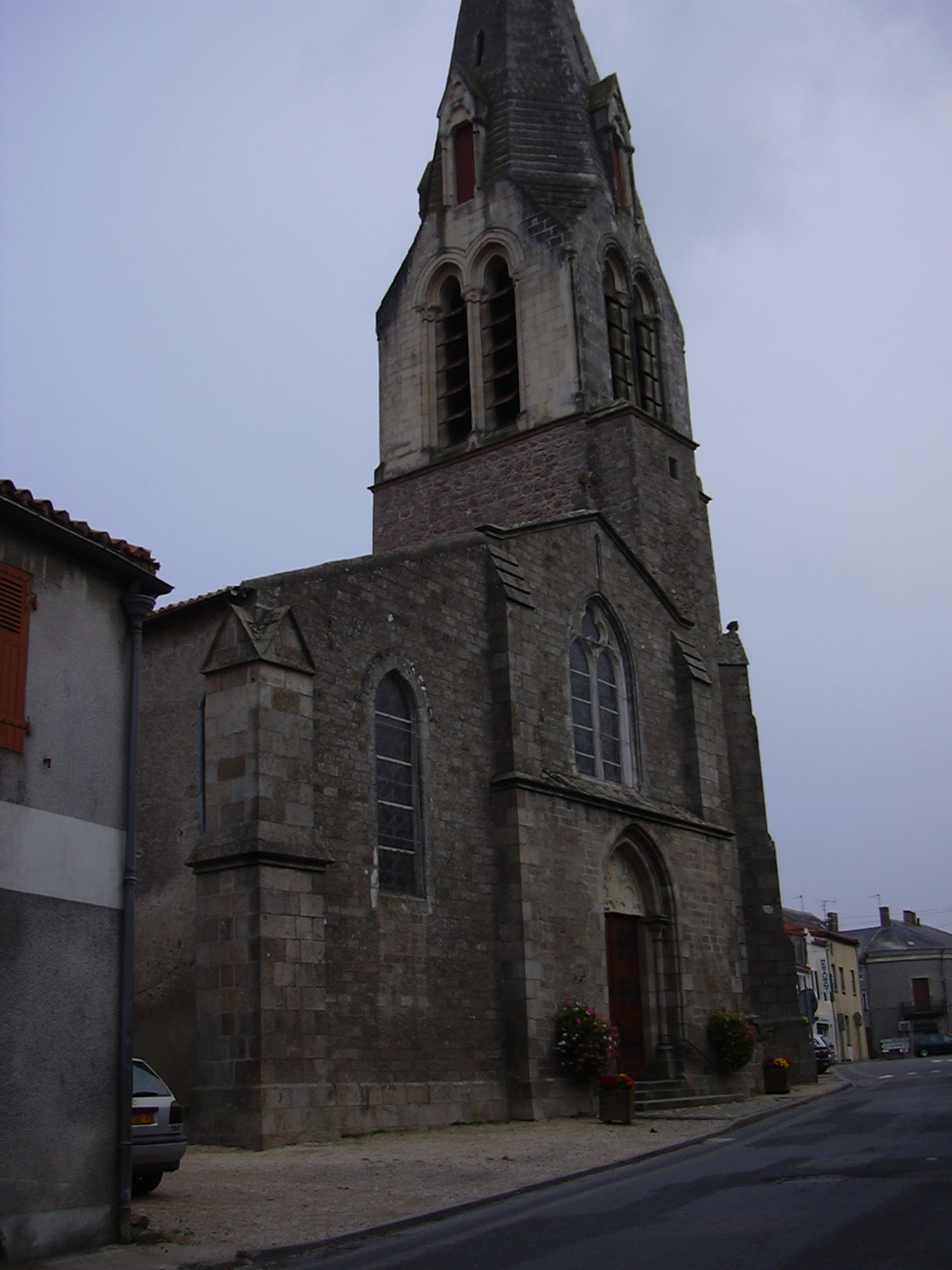
- The church of Saint-hilaire

- Coat of arms
- Location of Nueil-les-Aubiers
- Location within France Location within Nouvelle-Aquitaine
- Coordinates: 46°56′17″N 0°35′19″W
- Country: France
- Region: Nouvelle-Aquitaine
- Department: Deux-Sèvres
- Arrondissement: Bressuire
- Canton: Mauléon
- Intercommunality: CA Bocage Bressuirais

Government
  - Mayor (2020–2026): Serge Bouju
- Area^{1}: 98.83 km^{2} (38.16 sq mi)
- Elevation: 126 m (413 ft)
- Highest elevation: 211 m (692 ft)
- Lowest elevation: 94 m (308 ft)
- Population (2023): 5,483
  - Density: 55.48/km^{2} (143.7/sq mi)
- Time zone: UTC+01:00 (CET)
  - Summer (DST): UTC+02:00 (CEST)
- INSEE/Postal code: 79195 /79250
- ^{1} French Land Register data, which excludes lakes, ponds, glaciers > 1 km^{2} (0.386 sq mi or 247 acres) and river estuaries.

Nueil-les-Aubiers (French pronunciation: [nɥɛj le.z‿obje]) is a commune in the Deux-Sèvres department in western France.

== Population ==
Historical population
Year	Pop.	±% p.a.
1968	4,034	—
1975	4,534	+1.68%
1982	4,896	+1.10%
1990	5,080	+0.46%
1999	4,992	−0.19%
2007	5,370	+0.92%
2012	5,569	+0.73%
2017	5,541	−0.10%
2023	5,483	−0.18%
Source: INSEE

== Twin towns ==
In 1996 it was twinned with the town of Attleborough in Norfolk, England.

== See also ==
- Communes of the Deux-Sèvres department
