= Montbellet =

- Commune
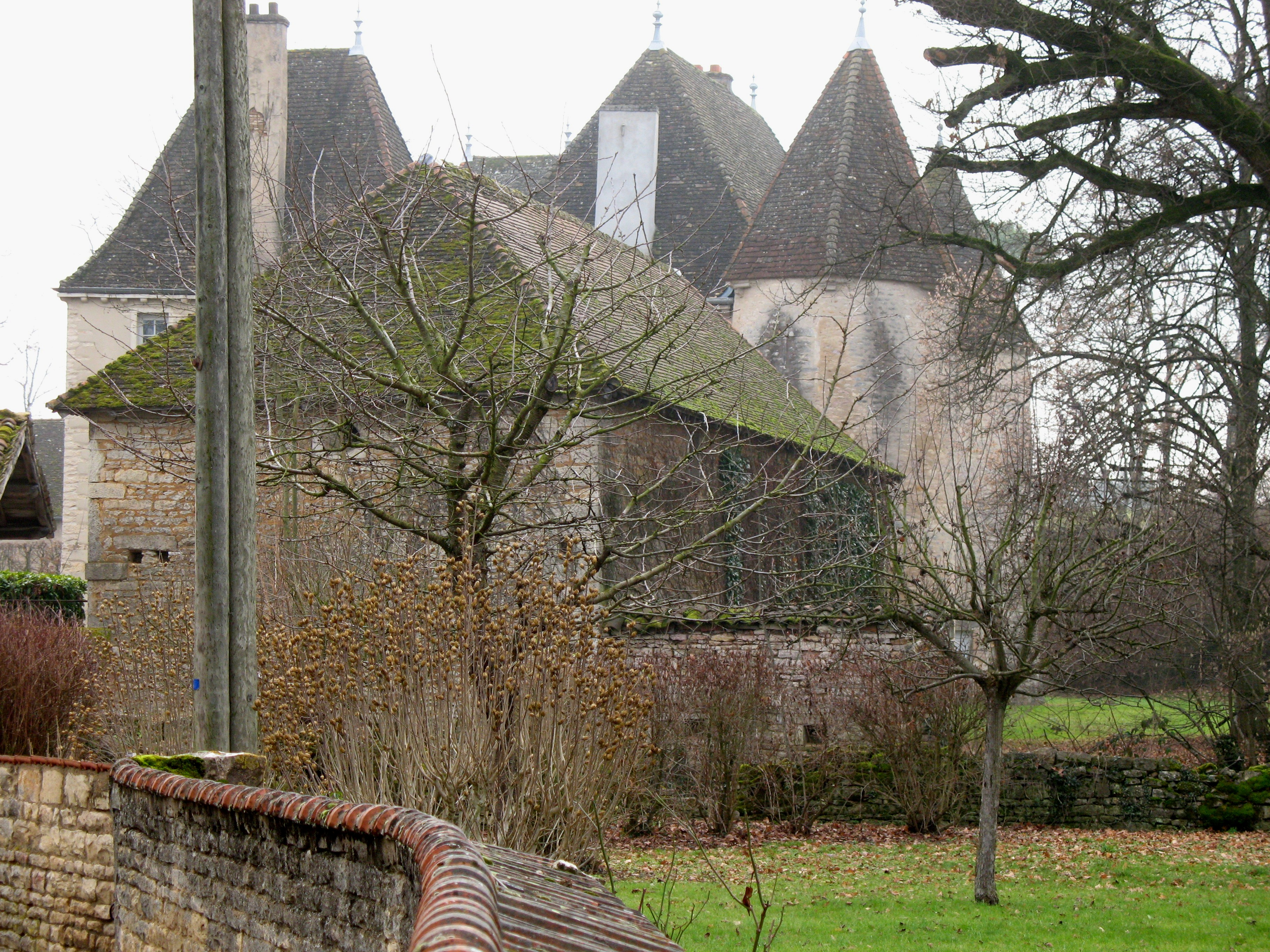
- Chateau of Mercey
- Location of Montbellet
- Location within France Location within Bourgogne-Franche-Comté
- Coordinates: 46°28′34″N 4°52′22″E
- Country: France
- Region: Bourgogne-Franche-Comté
- Department: Saône-et-Loire
- Arrondissement: Mâcon
- Canton: Hurigny

Government
  - Mayor (2020–2026): Marie-Thérèse Drevet
- Area^{1}: 19.78 km^{2} (7.64 sq mi)
- Elevation: 182 m (597 ft)
- Highest elevation: 340 m (1,120 ft)
- Lowest elevation: 169 m (554 ft)
- Population (2023): 870
  - Density: 44/km^{2} (110/sq mi)
- Time zone: UTC+01:00 (CET)
  - Summer (DST): UTC+02:00 (CEST)
- INSEE/Postal code: 71305 /71260
- ^{1} French Land Register data, which excludes lakes, ponds, glaciers > 1 km^{2} (0.386 sq mi or 247 acres) and river estuaries.

Montbellet (French pronunciation: [mɔ̃bɛlɛ]) is a commune in the Saône-et-Loire department in the region of Bourgogne-Franche-Comté in eastern France.

== Wine ==
Vineyards of Montbellet are part of the AOC Viré-Clessé, which is used for white wines from Chardonnay grapes.

== See also ==
- Communes of the Saône-et-Loire department
