= Largeasse =

- Commune
- Location of Largeasse
- Location within France Location within Nouvelle-Aquitaine
- Coordinates: 46°41′40″N 0°29′55″W
- Country: France
- Region: Nouvelle-Aquitaine
- Department: Deux-Sèvres
- Arrondissement: Bressuire
- Canton: Cerizay
- Intercommunality: CA Bocage Bressuirais

Government
  - Mayor (2020–2026): Jean-Jacques Grolleau
- Area^{1}: 30.35 km^{2} (11.72 sq mi)
- Elevation: 200 m (660 ft)
- Highest elevation: 213 m (699 ft)
- Lowest elevation: 163 m (535 ft)
- Population (2023): 759
  - Density: 25.0/km^{2} (64.8/sq mi)
- Time zone: UTC+01:00 (CET)
  - Summer (DST): UTC+02:00 (CEST)
- INSEE/Postal code: 79147 /79240
- ^{1} French Land Register data, which excludes lakes, ponds, glaciers > 1 km^{2} (0.386 sq mi or 247 acres) and river estuaries.

Largeasse (French pronunciation: [laʁʒas]) is a commune in the Deux-Sèvres department in western France.

== See also ==
- Communes of the Deux-Sèvres department
