= Viré-Clessé =

French wine

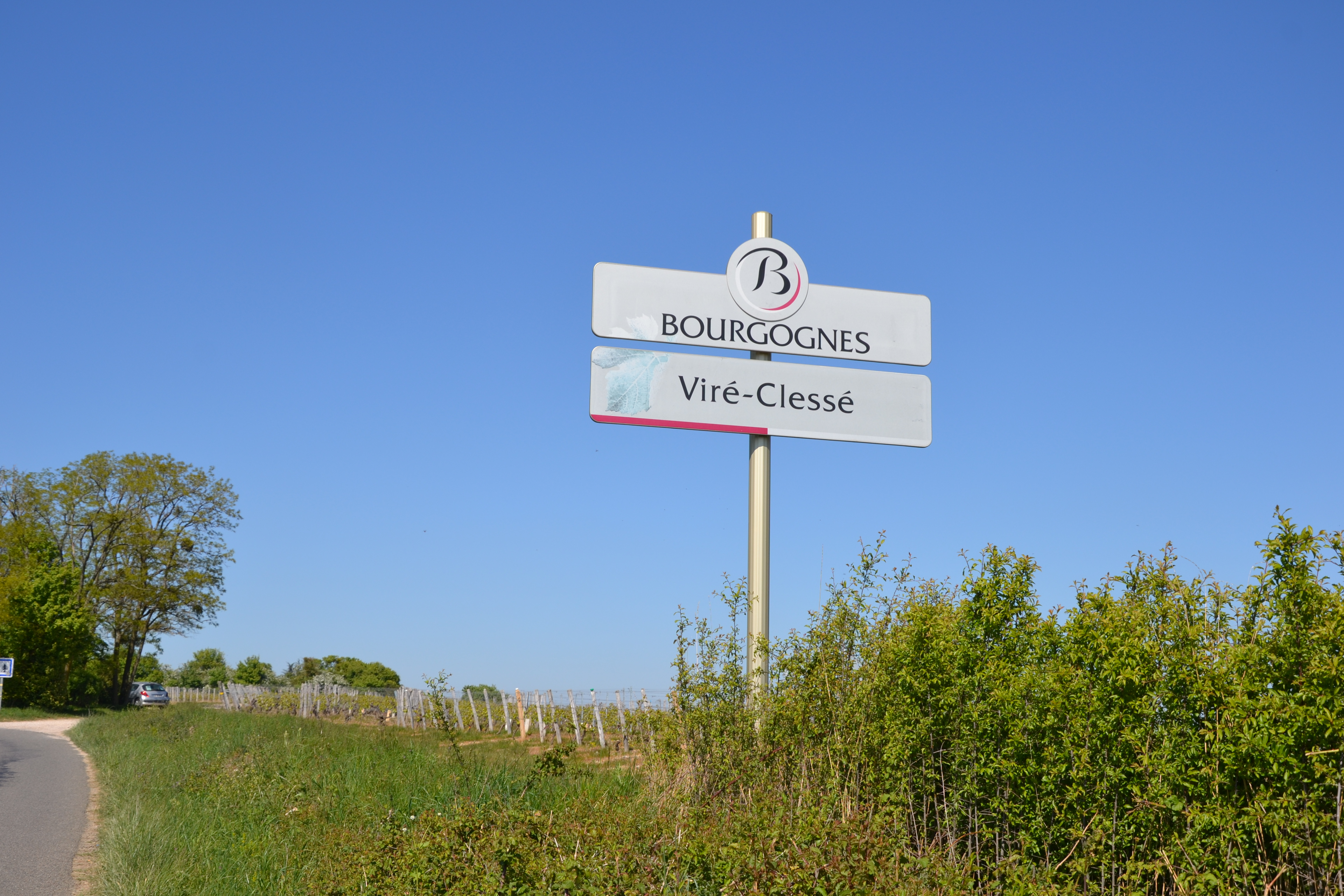
Wine road, near Clessé village

Viré-Clessé is an Appellation d'Origine Contrôlée (AOC) for white wine in the Mâconnais subregion in Burgundy in central France, located in the communes of Clessé, Laizé, Montbellet and Viré. Viré-Clessé has Chardonnay as the only allowed grape variety. There are no Premier Cru vineyards within the AOC. The AOC was created in 1999, when this area was upgraded to be a communal-level appellation of its own ("a separate Mâconnais cru" similar to e.g. Pouilly-Fuissé) rather than being part of the subregional Mâcon AOC, which covers a much larger area. Before the Viré-Clessé AOC was created, the wines could be labelled Mâcon-Vire or Mâcon-Clessé.

The Viré-Clessé AOC is located in the northern part of the Mâconnais subregion, north of the town of Mâcon, in the direction of the Côte Chalonnaise subregion.

== Production ==
In 2008, 390.57 hectares (965.1 acres) of vineyard surface was in production for Viré-Clessé AOC, and 21,925 hectoliter of wine was produced, corresponding to just over 2.9 million bottles of white wine.

== AOC regulations ==
The AOC regulations only allow Chardonnay to be used. The allowed base yield is 55 hectoliter per hectare and the grapes must reach a maturity of at least 11.0 per cent potential alcohol. The specifications of the appellation were revised by Decree 2011-1794 of 5 December 2011.
