= La Petite-Boissière =

- Commune
- Location of La Petite-Boissière
- Location within France Location within Nouvelle-Aquitaine
- Coordinates: 46°53′04″N 0°44′28″W
- Country: France
- Region: Nouvelle-Aquitaine
- Department: Deux-Sèvres
- Arrondissement: Bressuire
- Canton: Mauléon
- Intercommunality: CA Bocage Bressuirais

Government
  - Mayor (2020–2026): Joël Barraud
- Area^{1}: 12.92 km^{2} (4.99 sq mi)
- Elevation: 215 m (705 ft)
- Highest elevation: 213 m (699 ft)
- Lowest elevation: 149 m (489 ft)
- Population (2023): 616
  - Density: 47.7/km^{2} (123/sq mi)
- Time zone: UTC+01:00 (CET)
  - Summer (DST): UTC+02:00 (CEST)
- INSEE/Postal code: 79207 /79700
- ^{1} French Land Register data, which excludes lakes, ponds, glaciers > 1 km^{2} (0.386 sq mi or 247 acres) and river estuaries.

La Petite-Boissière (French pronunciation: [la pətit bwasjɛʁ]) is a commune in the Deux-Sèvres department in western France.

== See also ==
- Communes of the Deux-Sèvres department
