= Chanteloup, Deux-Sèvres =

Chanteloup
- Commune
- Location of Chanteloup
- Location within France Location within Nouvelle-Aquitaine
- Coordinates: 46°46′02″N 0°31′23″W
- Country: France
- Region: Nouvelle-Aquitaine
- Department: Deux-Sèvres
- Arrondissement: Bressuire
- Canton: Cerizay
- Intercommunality: CA Bocage Bressuirais

Government
  - Mayor (2020–2026): Dominique Tricot
- Area^{1}: 20.71 km^{2} (8.00 sq mi)
- Elevation: 235 m (771 ft)
- Highest elevation: 232 m (761 ft)
- Lowest elevation: 152 m (499 ft)
- Population (2023): 985
  - Density: 47.6/km^{2} (123/sq mi)
- Time zone: UTC+01:00 (CET)
  - Summer (DST): UTC+02:00 (CEST)
- INSEE/Postal code: 79069 /79320
- ^{1} French Land Register data, which excludes lakes, ponds, glaciers > 1 km^{2} (0.386 sq mi or 247 acres) and river estuaries.

Chanteloup (French pronunciation: [ʃɑ̃tlu]) is a commune in the Deux-Sèvres department in the Nouvelle-Aquitaine region in western France.

Etrie castle of Chanteloup was built in the 17th century by the Beauregard family. It has a chapel surrounded by forests and the Libeau meadows. There are deer and hares roaming freely. The Libeau mill now houses a health center and permaculture seed saver organic farm.

== See also ==
- Communes of the Deux-Sèvres department
