= Genneton =

- Commune
- Location of Genneton
- Location within France Location within Nouvelle-Aquitaine
- Coordinates: 47°03′19″N 0°25′36″W
- Country: France
- Region: Nouvelle-Aquitaine
- Department: Deux-Sèvres
- Arrondissement: Bressuire
- Canton: Mauléon
- Intercommunality: CA Bocage Bressuirais

Government
  - Mayor (2020–2026): Jacques Béliard
- Area^{1}: 27.75 km^{2} (10.71 sq mi)
- Elevation: 110 m (360 ft)
- Highest elevation: 128 m (420 ft)
- Lowest elevation: 89 m (292 ft)
- Population (2023): 302
  - Density: 10.9/km^{2} (28.2/sq mi)
- Time zone: UTC+01:00 (CET)
  - Summer (DST): UTC+02:00 (CEST)
- INSEE/Postal code: 79132 /79150
- ^{1} French Land Register data, which excludes lakes, ponds, glaciers > 1 km^{2} (0.386 sq mi or 247 acres) and river estuaries.

Genneton (French pronunciation: [ʒɛntɔ̃]) is a commune in the Deux-Sèvres department in the Nouvelle-Aquitaine region in western France.

== Geography ==
The commune is traversed by the river Layon.

== See also ==
- Communes of the Deux-Sèvres department
