= Mazières-en-Gâtine =

- Commune
- Coat of arms
- Location of Mazières-en-Gâtine
- Location within France Location within Nouvelle-Aquitaine
- Coordinates: 46°32′00″N 0°19′20″W
- Country: France
- Region: Nouvelle-Aquitaine
- Department: Deux-Sèvres
- Arrondissement: Parthenay
- Canton: La Gâtine
- Intercommunality: Val-de-Gâtine

Government
  - Mayor (2020–2026): Jacques Fradin
- Area^{1}: 19.06 km^{2} (7.36 sq mi)
- Elevation: 190 m (620 ft)
- Highest elevation: 226 m (741 ft)
- Lowest elevation: 107 m (351 ft)
- Population (2023): 1,047
  - Density: 54.93/km^{2} (142.3/sq mi)
- Time zone: UTC+01:00 (CET)
  - Summer (DST): UTC+02:00 (CEST)
- INSEE/Postal code: 79172 /79310
- ^{1} French Land Register data, which excludes lakes, ponds, glaciers > 1 km^{2} (0.386 sq mi or 247 acres) and river estuaries.

Mazières-en-Gâtine (French pronunciation: [mazjɛʁ ɑ̃ ɡatin]) is a commune in the Deux-Sèvres department in western France.

== See also ==
- Gâtine Vendéenne
- Communes of the Deux-Sèvres department
