= Montravers =

- Commune
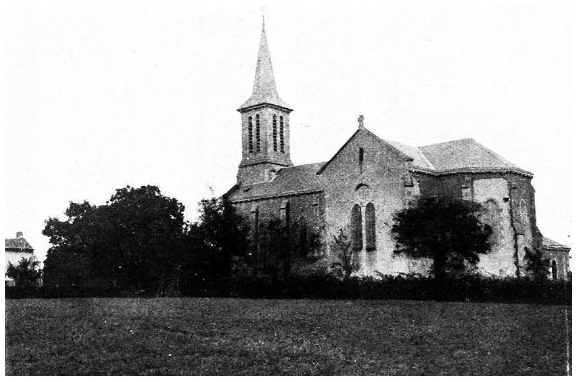
- The church in Montravers
- Location of Montravers
- Location within France Location within Nouvelle-Aquitaine
- Coordinates: 46°49′46″N 0°43′01″W
- Country: France
- Region: Nouvelle-Aquitaine
- Department: Deux-Sèvres
- Arrondissement: Bressuire
- Canton: Cerizay
- Intercommunality: CA Bocage Bressuirais

Government
  - Mayor (2020–2026): Rodolphe Roué
- Area^{1}: 10.12 km^{2} (3.91 sq mi)
- Elevation: 186 m (610 ft)
- Highest elevation: 198 m (650 ft)
- Lowest elevation: 141 m (463 ft)
- Population (2023): 365
  - Density: 36.1/km^{2} (93.4/sq mi)
- Time zone: UTC+01:00 (CET)
  - Summer (DST): UTC+02:00 (CEST)
- INSEE/Postal code: 79183 /79140
- ^{1} French Land Register data, which excludes lakes, ponds, glaciers > 1 km^{2} (0.386 sq mi or 247 acres) and river estuaries.

Montravers is a commune in the Deux-Sèvres department in western France.

== See also ==
- Communes of the Deux-Sèvres department
