= Canton of Mauléon =

Coordinates: 46.92°N 0.75°W

The canton of Mauléon is an administrative division of the Deux-Sèvres department, western France. Its borders were modified at the French canton reorganisation which came into effect in March 2015. Its seat is in Mauléon.

It consists of the following communes:

1. Argentonnay
2. Genneton
3. Mauléon
4. Nueil-les-Aubiers
5. La Petite-Boissière
6. Saint-Amand-sur-Sèvre
7. Saint-Aubin-du-Plain
8. Saint-Maurice-Étusson
9. Saint-Pierre-des-Échaubrognes
10. Voulmentin
