= Communauté d'agglomération du Bocage Bressuirais =

Bocage Bressuirais
- Communauté d'agglomération
- Interactive map of Bocage Bressuirais
- Coordinates: 46°51′N 00°32′W
- Country: France
- Region: Nouvelle-Aquitaine
- Department: Deux-Sèvres
- No. of communes: {{{nbcomm}}}
- Established: 2014
- Area: 1,318.8 km^{2} (509.2 sq mi)
- Population (2019): 73,944
  - Density: 56.069/km^{2} (145.22/sq mi)
- Website: www.agglo2b.fr

Communauté d'agglomération du Bocage Bressuirais is the communauté d'agglomération, an intercommunal structure, centred on the town of Bressuire. It is located in the Deux-Sèvres department, in the Nouvelle-Aquitaine region, western France. Created in 2014, its seat is in Bressuire. Its area is 1318.8 km^{2}. Its population was 73,944 in 2019, of which 19,850 in Bressuire proper.

== Composition ==
The communauté d'agglomération consists of the following 33 communes:

1. L'Absie
2. Argentonnay
3. Boismé
4. Bressuire
5. Bretignolles
6. Cerizay
7. Chanteloup
8. La Chapelle-Saint-Laurent
9. Chiché
10. Cirières
11. Clessé
12. Combrand
13. Courlay
14. Faye-l'Abbesse
15. La Forêt-sur-Sèvre
16. Geay
17. Genneton
18. Largeasse
19. Mauléon
20. Moncoutant-sur-Sèvre
21. Montravers
22. Neuvy-Bouin
23. Nueil-les-Aubiers
24. La Petite-Boissière
25. Le Pin
26. Saint-Amand-sur-Sèvre
27. Saint-André-sur-Sèvre
28. Saint-Aubin-du-Plain
29. Saint-Maurice-Étusson
30. Saint-Paul-en-Gâtine
31. Saint-Pierre-des-Échaubrognes
32. Trayes
33. Voulmentin
