= Mauléon, Deux-Sèvres =

Mauléon
- Commune
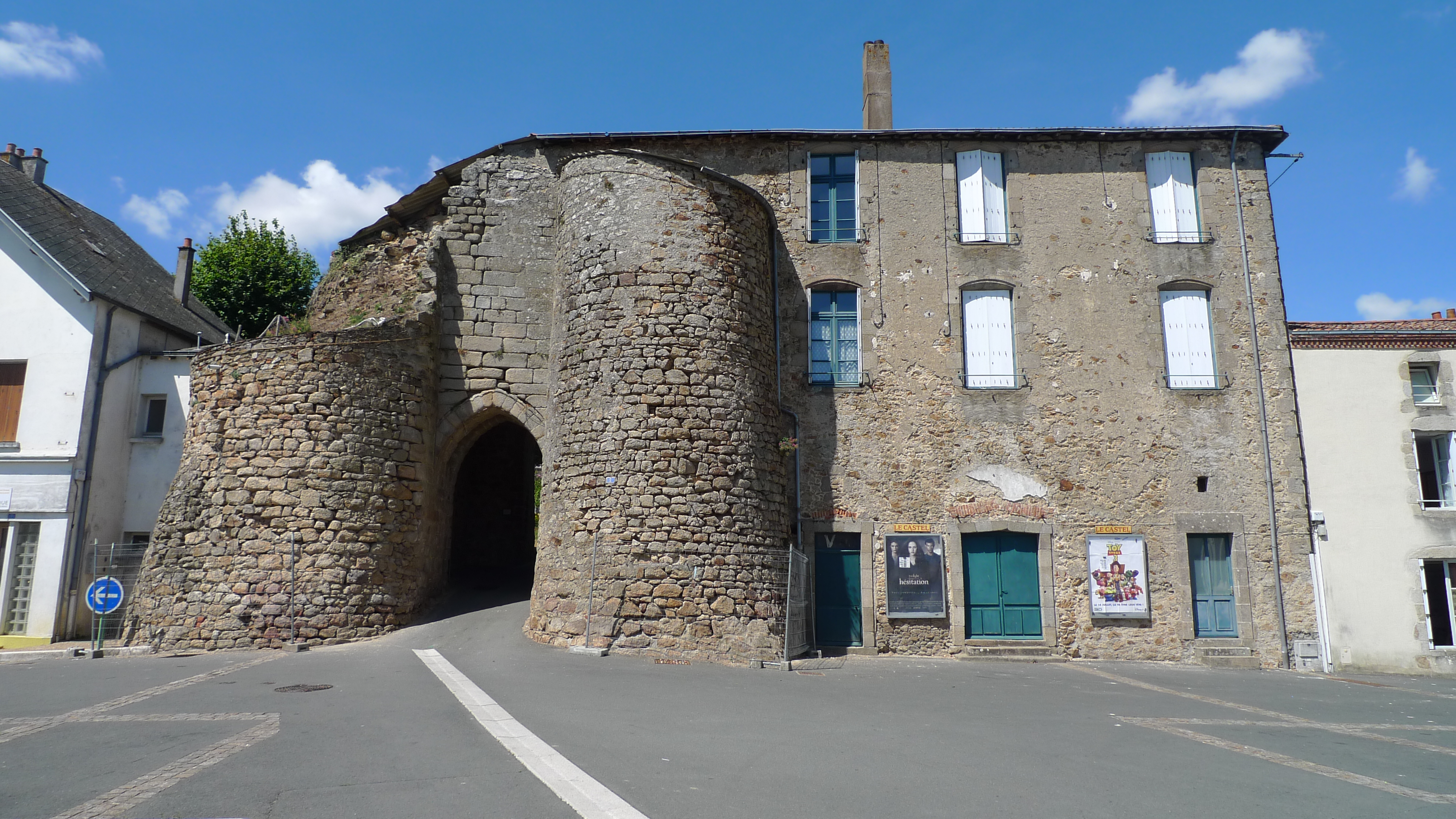
- The old fortified gate, in Mauléon

- Coat of arms
- Location of Mauléon
- Location within France Location within Nouvelle-Aquitaine
- Coordinates: 46°55′25″N 0°44′54″W
- Country: France
- Region: Nouvelle-Aquitaine
- Department: Deux-Sèvres
- Arrondissement: Bressuire
- Canton: Mauléon
- Intercommunality: CA Bocage Bressuirais

Government
  - Mayor (2020–2026): Pierre-Yves Marolleau
- Area^{1}: 120.64 km^{2} (46.58 sq mi)
- Elevation: 187 m (614 ft)
- Highest elevation: 226 m (741 ft)
- Lowest elevation: 104 m (341 ft)
- Population (2023): 8,573
  - Density: 71.06/km^{2} (184.1/sq mi)
- Time zone: UTC+01:00 (CET)
  - Summer (DST): UTC+02:00 (CEST)
- INSEE/Postal code: 79079 /79700
- ^{1} French Land Register data, which excludes lakes, ponds, glaciers > 1 km^{2} (0.386 sq mi or 247 acres) and river estuaries.

Mauléon, also known as Mauléon-Bocage (French pronunciation: [moleɔ̃ bɔkaʒ]) is a commune and town in the French department of Deux-Sèvres, in the region of Nouvelle-Aquitaine, western France. It is around 20 km southeast of Cholet, and around 70 km southeast of Nantes.

The commune is listed as a Village étape.

== History ==
Mauléon was formed in 1965 by the merger of the two former communes of Châtillon-sur-Sèvre and Saint-Jouin-sous-Châtillon. In January 1973, Mauléon absorbed the former communes La Chapelle-Largeau, Loublande, Rorthais, Saint-Amand-sur-Sèvre, Saint-Aubin-de-Baubigné, Le Temple and Moulins. In January 1992 Saint-Amand-sur-Sèvre was re-established as an independent commune.

== Population ==
Population data refer to the area corresponding with the commune as of January 2025.

Historical population
Year	Pop.	±% p.a.
1968	6,710	—
1975	6,991	+0.59%
1982	7,234	+0.49%
1990	7,514	+0.48%
1999	7,327	−0.28%
2007	7,885	+0.92%
2012	8,354	+1.16%
2017	8,519	+0.39%
2023	8,573	+0.11%
Source: INSEE

== See also ==
- Communes of the Deux-Sèvres department
