= Cirières =

- Commune
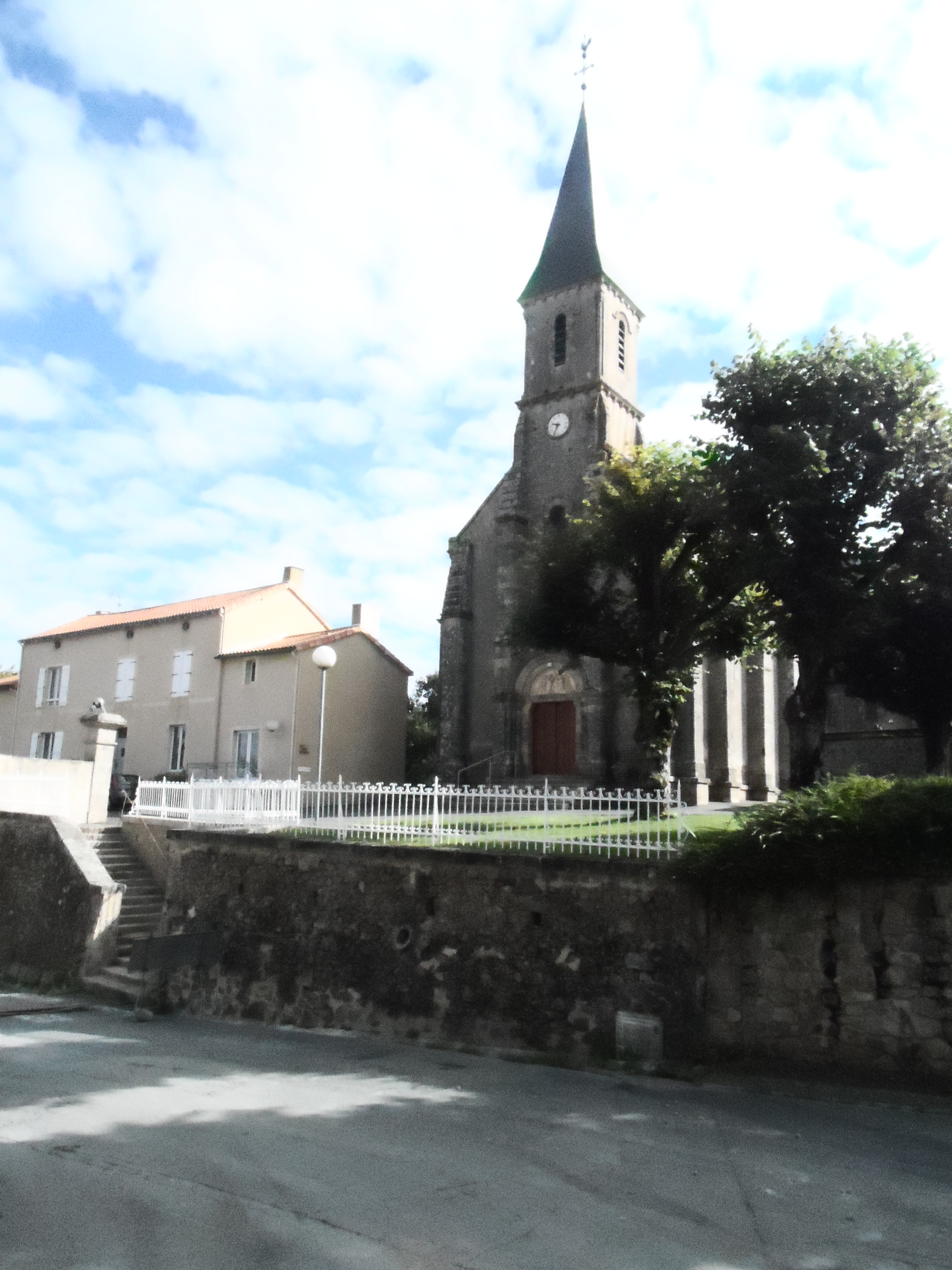
- The church of Sainte-Radegonde
- Location of Cirières
- Location within France Location within Nouvelle-Aquitaine
- Coordinates: 46°50′16″N 0°37′11″W
- Country: France
- Region: Nouvelle-Aquitaine
- Department: Deux-Sèvres
- Arrondissement: Bressuire
- Canton: Cerizay
- Intercommunality: CA Bocage Bressuirais

Government
  - Mayor (2020–2026): Jean-Baptiste Fortin
- Area^{1}: 16.83 km^{2} (6.50 sq mi)
- Highest elevation: 234 m (768 ft)
- Lowest elevation: 162 m (531 ft)
- Population (2023): 950
  - Density: 56/km^{2} (150/sq mi)
- Time zone: UTC+01:00 (CET)
  - Summer (DST): UTC+02:00 (CEST)
- INSEE/Postal code: 79091 /79140
- ^{1} French Land Register data, which excludes lakes, ponds, glaciers > 1 km^{2} (0.386 sq mi or 247 acres) and river estuaries.

Cirières (French pronunciation: [siʁjɛʁ], before 2002: Cirière) is a commune in the Deux-Sèvres department in the Nouvelle-Aquitaine region in western France.

== See also ==
- Communes of the Deux-Sèvres department
