= Courlay =

- Commune
- Coat of arms
- Location of Courlay
- Location within France Location within Nouvelle-Aquitaine
- Coordinates: 46°46′49″N 0°33′56″W
- Country: France
- Region: Nouvelle-Aquitaine
- Department: Deux-Sèvres
- Arrondissement: Bressuire
- Canton: Cerizay
- Intercommunality: CA Bocage Bressuirais

Government
  - Mayor (2020–2026): André Guillermic
- Area^{1}: 29.46 km^{2} (11.37 sq mi)
- Elevation: 193 m (633 ft)
- Highest elevation: 236 m (774 ft)
- Lowest elevation: 153 m (502 ft)
- Population (2023): 2,387
  - Density: 81.03/km^{2} (209.9/sq mi)
- Time zone: UTC+01:00 (CET)
  - Summer (DST): UTC+02:00 (CEST)
- INSEE/Postal code: 79103 /79440
- ^{1} French Land Register data, which excludes lakes, ponds, glaciers > 1 km^{2} (0.386 sq mi or 247 acres) and river estuaries.

Courlay (French pronunciation: [kuʁlɛ]) is a commune in the Deux-Sèvres department in the Nouvelle-Aquitaine region in western France.

== Population ==
Historical population
Year	Pop.	±% p.a.
1968	2,205	—
1975	2,391	+1.16%
1982	2,475	+0.49%
1990	2,558	+0.41%
1999	2,394	−0.73%
2007	2,356	−0.20%
2012	2,427	+0.60%
2017	2,436	+0.07%
2023	2,387	−0.34%
Source: INSEE

== See also ==
- Communes of the Deux-Sèvres department
