= Neuvy-Bouin =

- Commune
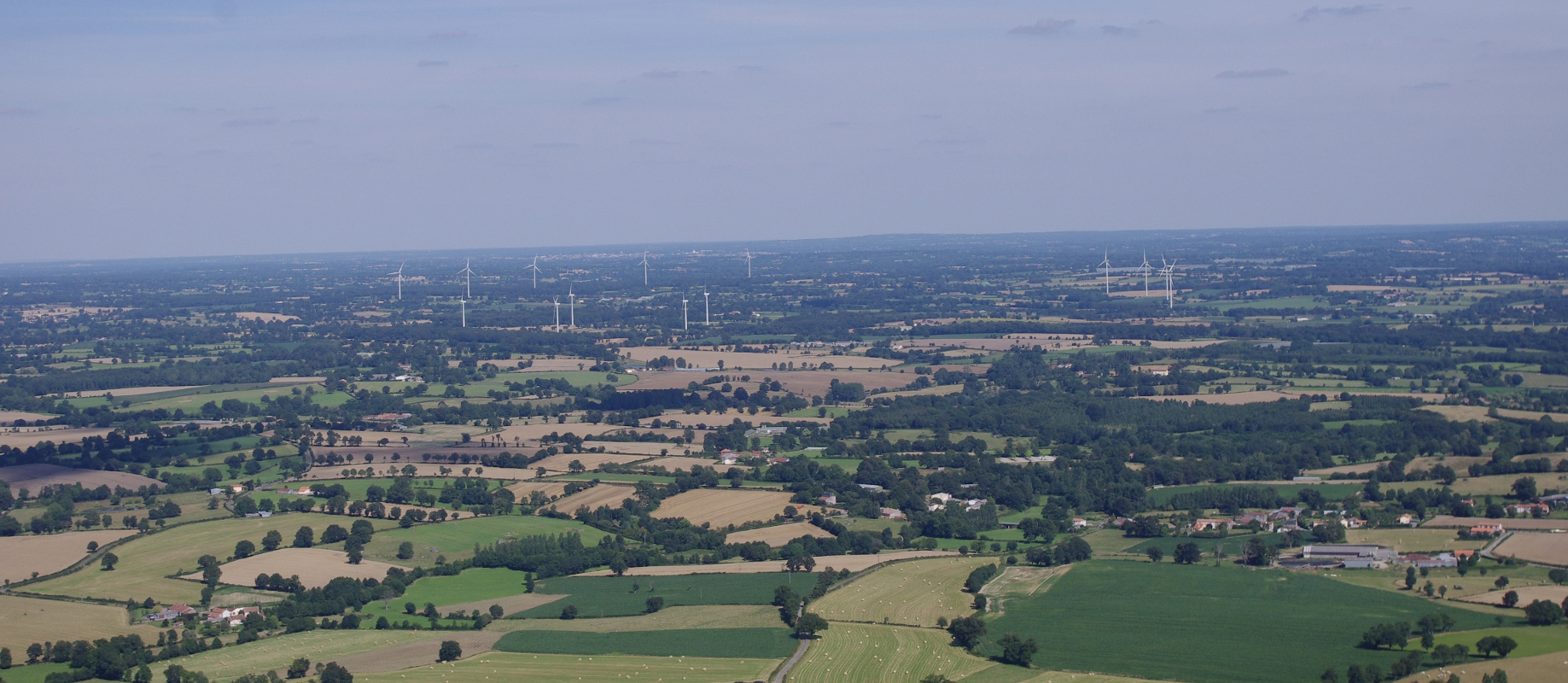
- An aerial view of the wind farm
- Location of Neuvy-Bouin
- Location within France Location within Nouvelle-Aquitaine
- Coordinates: 46°40′34″N 0°27′38″W
- Country: France
- Region: Nouvelle-Aquitaine
- Department: Deux-Sèvres
- Arrondissement: Bressuire
- Canton: Cerizay
- Intercommunality: CA Bocage Bressuirais

Government
  - Mayor (2020–2026): Claudine Grellier
- Area^{1}: 25 km^{2} (9.7 sq mi)
- Highest elevation: 231 m (758 ft)
- Lowest elevation: 179 m (587 ft)
- Population (2023): 487
  - Density: 19/km^{2} (50/sq mi)
- Time zone: UTC+01:00 (CET)
  - Summer (DST): UTC+02:00 (CEST)
- INSEE/Postal code: 79190 /
- ^{1} French Land Register data, which excludes lakes, ponds, glaciers > 1 km^{2} (0.386 sq mi or 247 acres) and river estuaries.

Neuvy-Bouin (French pronunciation: [nøvi bwɛ̃]) is a commune in the Deux-Sèvres department in western France.

== Geography ==
It is situated about 8 km north of Secondigny, 19 km west of Parthenay and 20 km south of Bressuire.

== See also ==
- Communes of the Deux-Sèvres department
