= La Forêt-sur-Sèvre =

- Commune
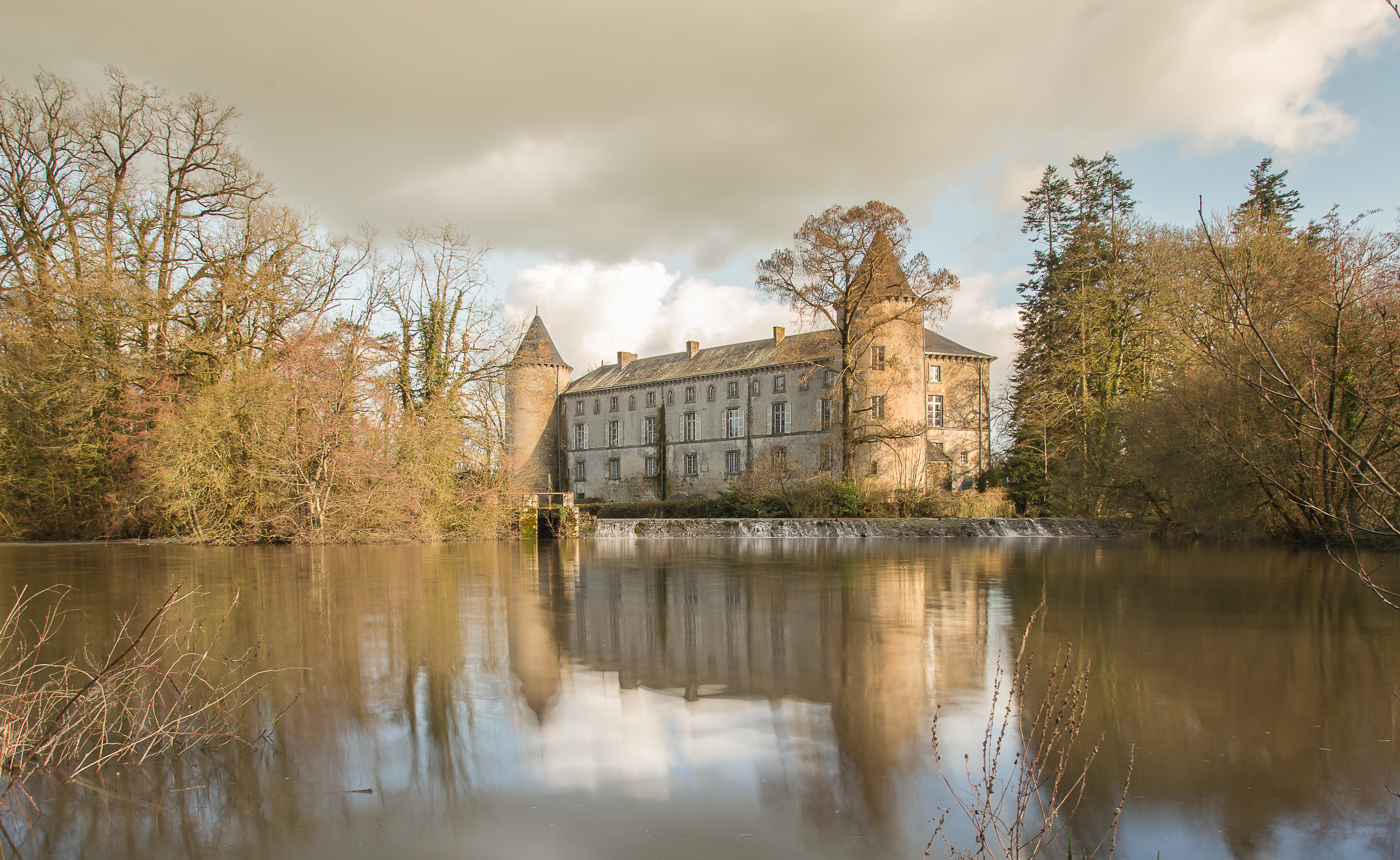
- Château de La Forêt-sur-Sèvre (rear facade, view from the northwest)
- Location of La Forêt-sur-Sèvre
- Location within France Location within Nouvelle-Aquitaine
- Coordinates: 46°46′15″N 0°38′55″W
- Country: France
- Region: Nouvelle-Aquitaine
- Department: Deux-Sèvres
- Arrondissement: Bressuire
- Canton: Cerizay
- Intercommunality: CA Bocage Bressuirais

Government
  - Mayor (2020–2026): Thierry Marolleau
- Area^{1}: 55.94 km^{2} (21.60 sq mi)
- Elevation: 153 m (502 ft)
- Highest elevation: 227 m (745 ft)
- Lowest elevation: 147 m (482 ft)
- Population (2023): 2,250
  - Density: 40.2/km^{2} (104/sq mi)
- Time zone: UTC+01:00 (CET)
  - Summer (DST): UTC+02:00 (CEST)
- INSEE/Postal code: 79123 /79380
- ^{1} French Land Register data, which excludes lakes, ponds, glaciers > 1 km^{2} (0.386 sq mi or 247 acres) and river estuaries.

La Forêt-sur-Sèvre (French pronunciation: [la fɔʁɛ syʁ sɛvʁ], literally The Forest on Sèvre) is a commune in the Deux-Sèvres department in the Nouvelle-Aquitaine region in western France.

== Population ==
Historical population
Year	Pop.	±% p.a.
1968	2,407	—
1975	2,363	−0.26%
1982	2,417	+0.32%
1990	2,395	−0.11%
1999	2,229	−0.79%
2007	2,329	+0.55%
2012	2,297	−0.28%
2017	2,365	+0.59%
2023	2,250	−0.83%
Source: INSEE

== See also ==
- Communes of the Deux-Sèvres department
