= Cerizay =

- Commune
- Coat of arms
- Location of Cerizay
- Location within France Location within Nouvelle-Aquitaine
- Coordinates: 46°49′20″N 0°39′48″W
- Country: France
- Region: Nouvelle-Aquitaine
- Department: Deux-Sèvres
- Arrondissement: Bressuire
- Canton: Cerizay
- Intercommunality: CA Bocage Bressuirais

Government
  - Mayor (2020–2026): Johnny Brosseau
- Area^{1}: 18.55 km^{2} (7.16 sq mi)
- Elevation: 173 m (568 ft)
- Highest elevation: 217 m (712 ft)
- Lowest elevation: 143 m (469 ft)
- Population (2023): 4,793
  - Density: 258.4/km^{2} (669.2/sq mi)
- Time zone: UTC+01:00 (CET)
  - Summer (DST): UTC+02:00 (CEST)
- INSEE/Postal code: 79062 /79140
- ^{1} French Land Register data, which excludes lakes, ponds, glaciers > 1 km^{2} (0.386 sq mi or 247 acres) and river estuaries.

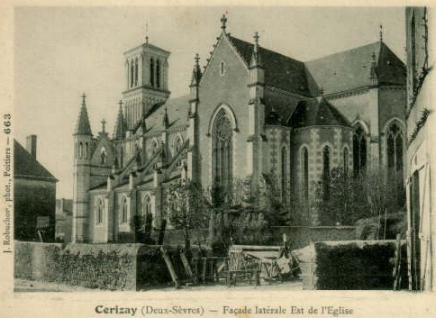
Ceriz Ay Cathedral mid

Cerizay (French pronunciation: [səʁizɛ]) is a commune in the Deux-Sèvres department in the Nouvelle-Aquitaine region in western France.

== History ==
The name Cerizay probably originated during the closing centuries of the Roman occupation. During the Middle Ages the old town centre was situated beside a feudal castle. The last two towers of the castle, along with its 12th-century chapel, were destroyed when the present (rather flamboyant) church was constructed in 1890.

== Population ==
Historical population
Year	Pop.	±% p.a.
1968	3,582	—
1975	4,687	+3.92%
1982	4,881	+0.58%
1990	4,787	−0.24%
1999	4,589	−0.47%
2007	4,591	+0.01%
2012	4,734	+0.62%
2017	4,768	+0.14%
2023	4,793	+0.09%
Source: INSEE

== Economy ==
The automotive coachbuilder firm Heuliez had its main production plant on the outskirts of the town. They have been involved in the production of various niche models for French car manufacturers. The firm currently construct the roof module for the Peugeot 206CC and till 2009 built the Vauxhall/Opel Tigra Twin Top. Between June 2011 and December 2013, the "Mia", an electric car developed in Germany, was built under contract with an annual output of 10,000 units.

== People ==
Famous residents include:

- Philippe de Mornay

== Twin towns ==
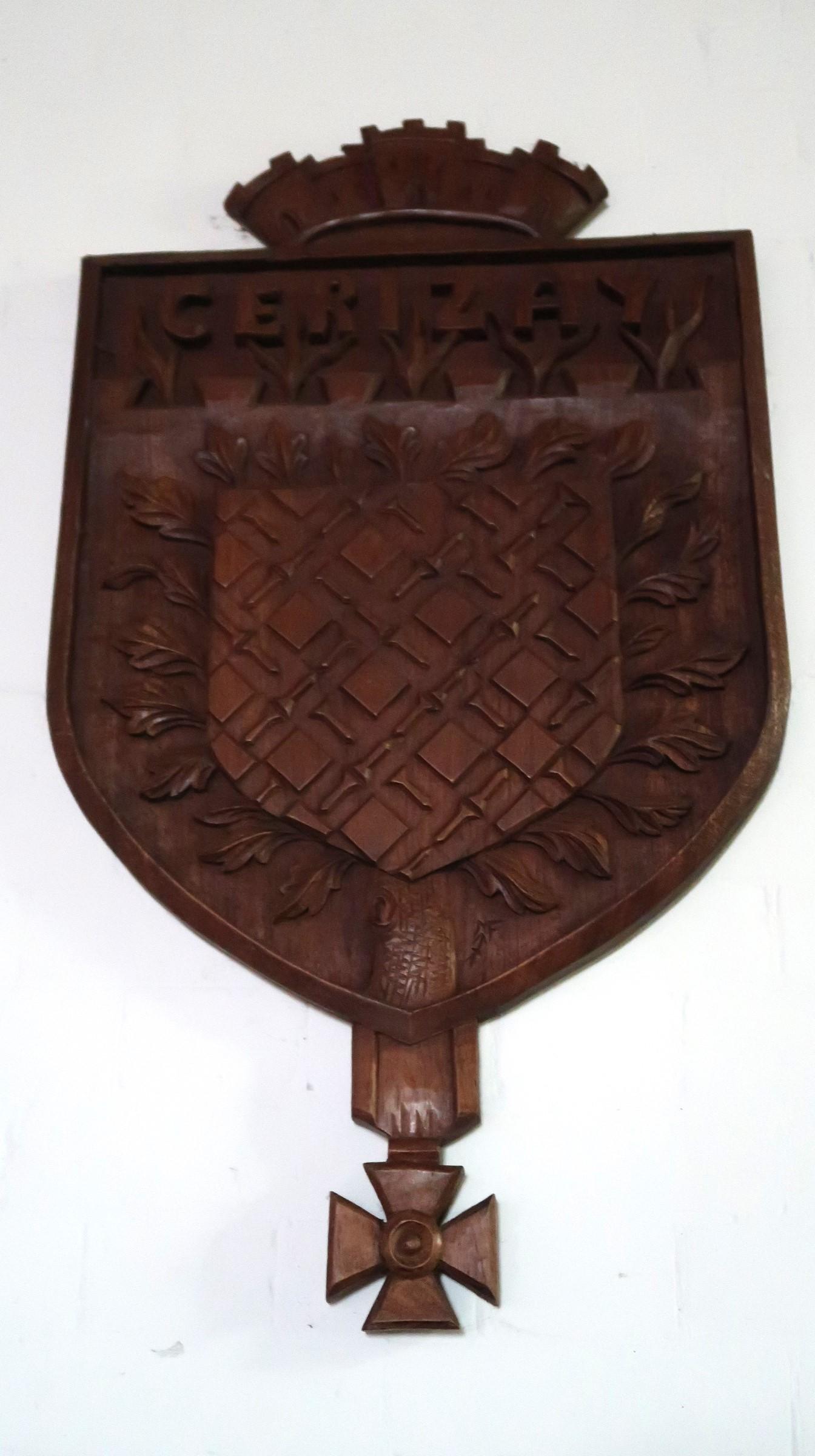
- Wall plaque in St Martin's Church, the parish church of Chipping Ongar, Essex, England
  Chipping Ongar, England.

== See also ==
- Communes of the Deux-Sèvres department
