= Saint-Paul-en-Gâtine =

- Commune
- Location of Saint-Paul-en-Gâtine
- Location within France Location within Nouvelle-Aquitaine
- Coordinates: 46°38′02″N 0°36′54″W
- Country: France
- Region: Nouvelle-Aquitaine
- Department: Deux-Sèvres
- Arrondissement: Bressuire
- Canton: Cerizay
- Intercommunality: CA Bocage Bressuirais

Government
  - Mayor (2020–2026): Jean Claude Metais
- Area^{1}: 15.39 km^{2} (5.94 sq mi)
- Elevation: 225 m (738 ft)
- Highest elevation: 262 m (860 ft)
- Lowest elevation: 118 m (387 ft)
- Population (2023): 501
  - Density: 32.6/km^{2} (84.3/sq mi)
- Time zone: UTC+01:00 (CET)
  - Summer (DST): UTC+02:00 (CEST)
- INSEE/Postal code: 79286 /79240
- ^{1} French Land Register data, which excludes lakes, ponds, glaciers > 1 km^{2} (0.386 sq mi or 247 acres) and river estuaries.

Saint-Paul-en-Gâtine (French pronunciation: [sɛ̃ pɔl ɑ̃ ɡɑtin]) is a commune in the Deux-Sèvres department in western France.

== See also ==
- Gâtine Vendéenne
- Communes of the Deux-Sèvres department
