= L'Absie =

- Commune
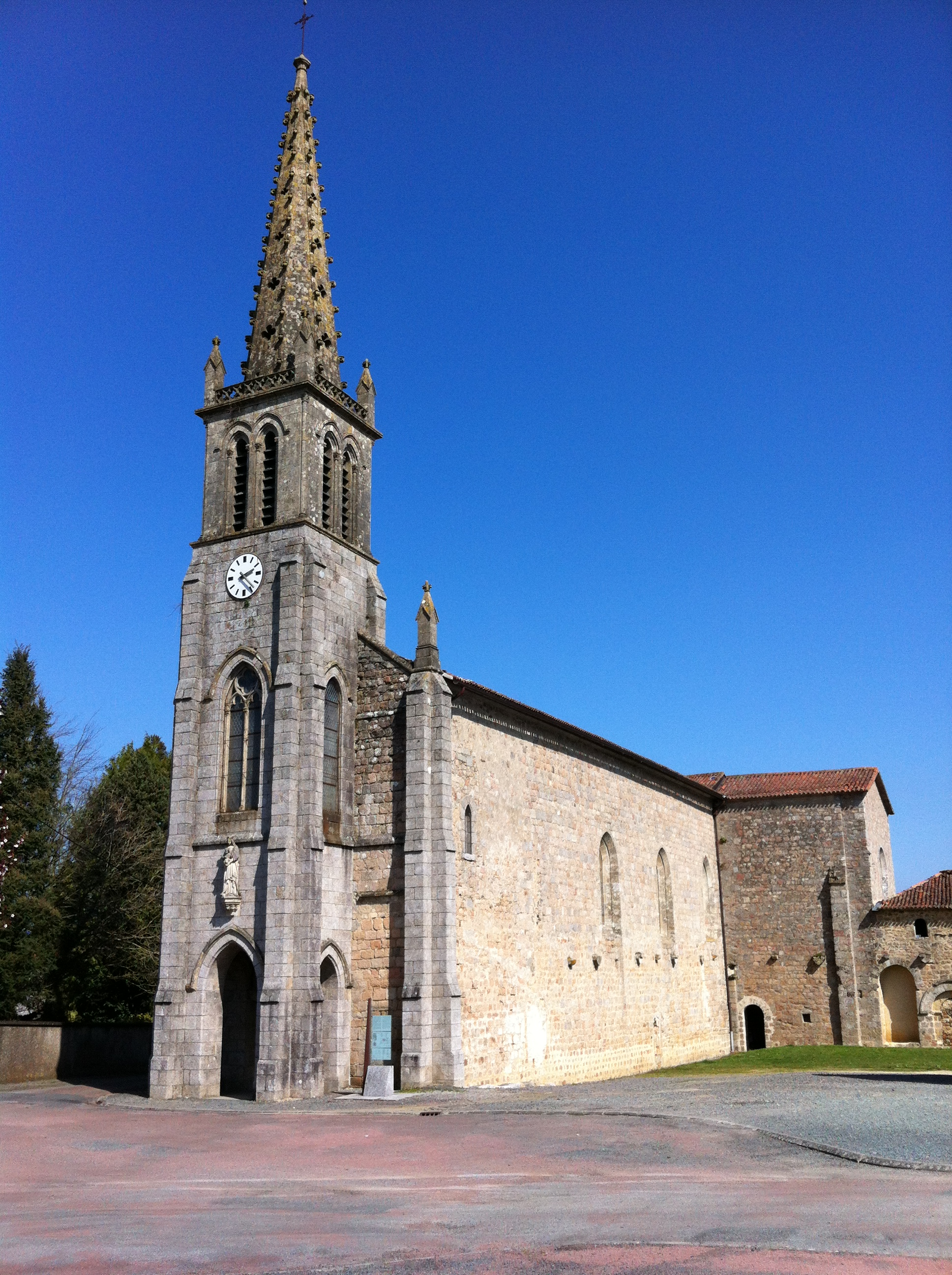
- The church in L'Absie

- Coat of arms
- Location of L'Absie
- Location within France Location within Nouvelle-Aquitaine
- Coordinates: 46°37′59″N 0°34′32″W
- Country: France
- Region: Nouvelle-Aquitaine
- Department: Deux-Sèvres
- Arrondissement: Bressuire
- Canton: Cerizay
- Intercommunality: CA Bocage Bressuirais

Government
  - Mayor (2025–2026): Muriel Helou-Devillers
- Area^{1}: 13.02 km^{2} (5.03 sq mi)
- Elevation: 259 m (850 ft)
- Highest elevation: 256 m (840 ft)
- Lowest elevation: 168 m (551 ft)
- Population (2023): 1,047
  - Density: 80.41/km^{2} (208.3/sq mi)
- Time zone: UTC+01:00 (CET)
  - Summer (DST): UTC+02:00 (CEST)
- INSEE/Postal code: 79001 /79240
- ^{1} French Land Register data, which excludes lakes, ponds, glaciers > 1 km^{2} (0.386 sq mi or 247 acres) and river estuaries.

L'Absie (French pronunciation: [lapsi]) is a commune in the Deux-Sèvres department in the Nouvelle-Aquitaine region in western France.

L'Absie is centred on the remains of a medieval abbey patronised by Eleanor of Aquitaine. L'Absie is also near the Vendée border, about an hour's drive from the sunny sandy beaches of the Atlantic coast.

== Population ==
Historical population
| Year | Pop. | ±% p.a. |
|---|---|---|
| 1968 | 1,331 | — |
| 1975 | 1,371 | +0.42% |
| 1982 | 1,342 | −0.30% |
| 1990 | 1,255 | −0.83% |
| 1999 | 1,096 | −1.49% |
| 2007 | 1,021 | −0.88% |
| 2012 | 1,009 | −0.24% |
| 2017 | 979 | −0.60% |
| 2023 | 1,047 | +1.13% |
Source: INSEE

== See also ==
- Communes of the Deux-Sèvres department
