= Combrand =

- Commune
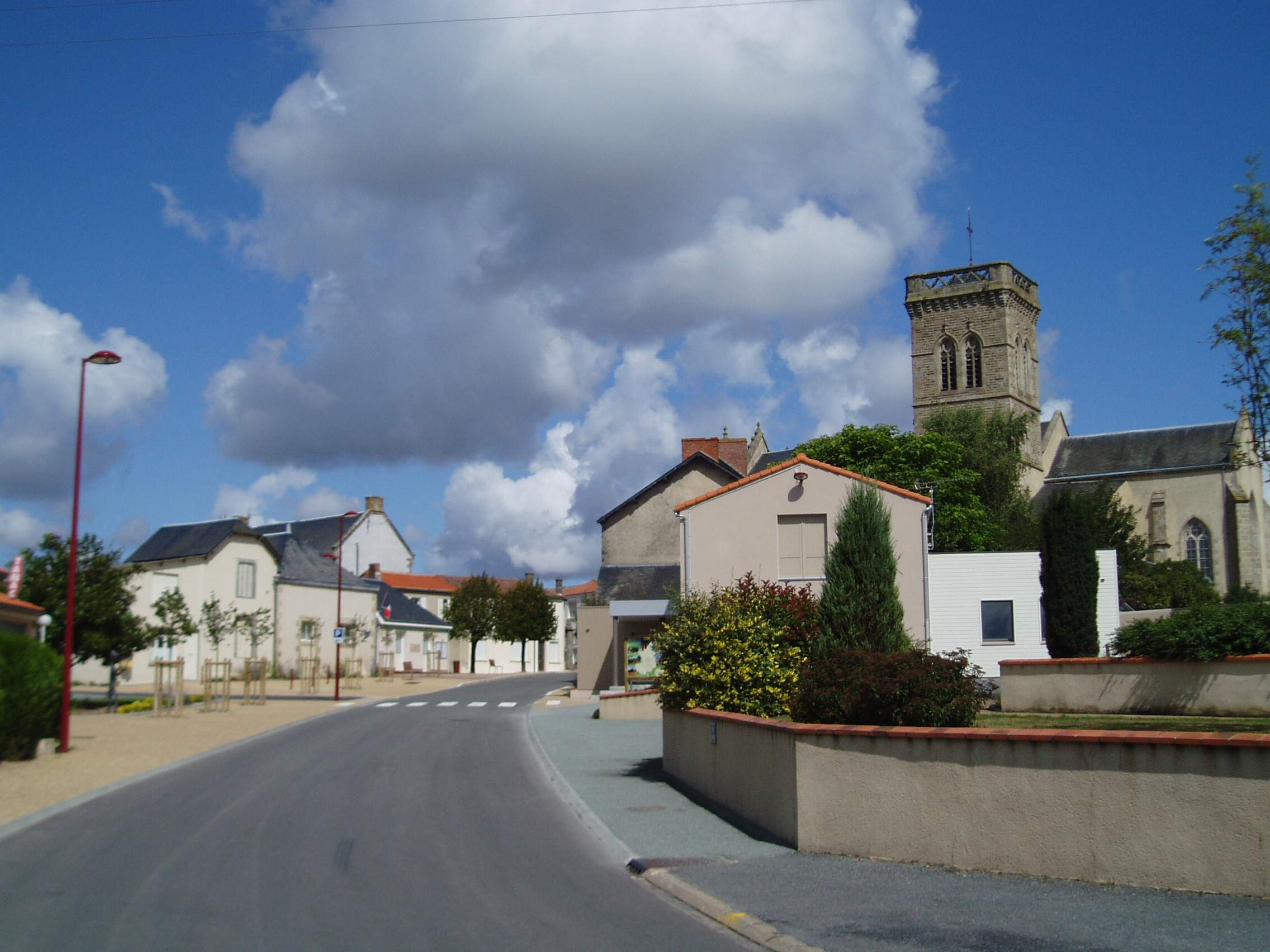
- The church and surrounding buildings in Combrand
- Location of Combrand
- Location within France Location within Nouvelle-Aquitaine
- Coordinates: 46°51′54″N 0°41′18″W
- Country: France
- Region: Nouvelle-Aquitaine
- Department: Deux-Sèvres
- Arrondissement: Bressuire
- Canton: Cerizay
- Intercommunality: CA Bocage Bressuirais

Government
  - Mayor (2020–2026): Anne-Marie Reveau
- Area^{1}: 24.62 km^{2} (9.51 sq mi)
- Elevation: 224 m (735 ft)
- Highest elevation: 222 m (728 ft)
- Lowest elevation: 140 m (460 ft)
- Population (2023): 1,222
  - Density: 49.63/km^{2} (128.6/sq mi)
- Time zone: UTC+01:00 (CET)
  - Summer (DST): UTC+02:00 (CEST)
- INSEE/Postal code: 79096 /79140
- ^{1} French Land Register data, which excludes lakes, ponds, glaciers > 1 km^{2} (0.386 sq mi or 247 acres) and river estuaries.

Combrand (French pronunciation: [kɔ̃bʁɑ̃]) is a commune in the Deux-Sèvres department in the Nouvelle-Aquitaine region in western France.

== See also ==
- Communes of the Deux-Sèvres department
