= Joseph Amand de Vasselot d'Annemarie =

French naval officer

Joseph Amand de Vasselot d'Annemarie (1762–1796) was a French naval officer, and a Vendée general during the War in the Vendée. He is known as the knight d'Annemarie and Baron de Vasselot, lord of Charlet.
