= Clessé, Saône-et-Loire =

Clessé
- Commune
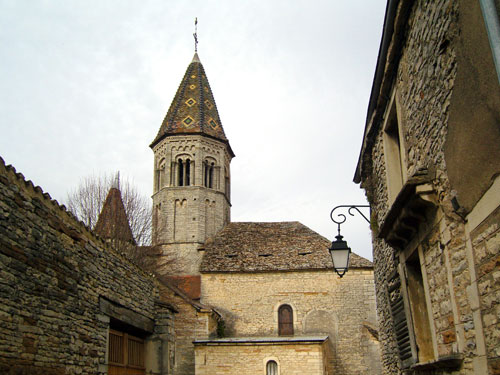
- The church in Clessé

- Coat of arms
- Location of Clessé
- Location within France Location within Bourgogne-Franche-Comté
- Coordinates: 46°25′02″N 4°48′56″E
- Country: France
- Region: Bourgogne-Franche-Comté
- Department: Saône-et-Loire
- Arrondissement: Mâcon
- Canton: Hurigny

Government
  - Mayor (2020–2026): Jean-Pierre Chervier
- Area^{1}: 10.06 km^{2} (3.88 sq mi)
- Elevation: 260 m (850 ft)
- Highest elevation: 326 m (1,070 ft)
- Lowest elevation: 200 m (660 ft)
- Population (2023): 829
  - Density: 82.4/km^{2} (213/sq mi)
- Time zone: UTC+01:00 (CET)
  - Summer (DST): UTC+02:00 (CEST)
- INSEE/Postal code: 71135 /71260
- ^{1} French Land Register data, which excludes lakes, ponds, glaciers > 1 km^{2} (0.386 sq mi or 247 acres) and river estuaries.

Clessé (French pronunciation: [klese]; Arpitan: Cllèssié) is a commune in the Saône-et-Loire department in the region of Bourgogne-Franche-Comté in eastern France.

== Wine ==
Vineyards of Clessé are part of the appellation d'origine contrôlée Viré-Clessé, which is used for white wines from Chardonnay grapes. Before 1999, the wines used to be called Mâcon-Clessé.

== See also ==
- Communes of the Saône-et-Loire department
