= Clessé, Deux-Sèvres =

Clessé
- Commune
- Location of Clessé
- Location within France Location within Nouvelle-Aquitaine
- Coordinates: 46°43′01″N 0°24′18″W
- Country: France
- Region: Nouvelle-Aquitaine
- Department: Deux-Sèvres
- Arrondissement: Bressuire
- Canton: Cerizay
- Intercommunality: CA Bocage Bressuirais

Government
  - Mayor (2020–2026): Christine Soulard
- Area^{1}: 29.08 km^{2} (11.23 sq mi)
- Elevation: 181 m (594 ft)
- Highest elevation: 236 m (774 ft)
- Lowest elevation: 138 m (453 ft)
- Population (2023): 923
  - Density: 31.7/km^{2} (82.2/sq mi)
- Time zone: UTC+01:00 (CET)
  - Summer (DST): UTC+02:00 (CEST)
- INSEE/Postal code: 79094 /79350
- ^{1} French Land Register data, which excludes lakes, ponds, glaciers > 1 km^{2} (0.386 sq mi or 247 acres) and river estuaries.

Clessé (French pronunciation: [klese]) is a commune in the Deux-Sèvres department in the Nouvelle-Aquitaine region in western France.

== See also ==
- Communes of the Deux-Sèvres department
