= Velluire =

Commune in Vendèe, France

- Part of Les Velluire-sur-Vendée
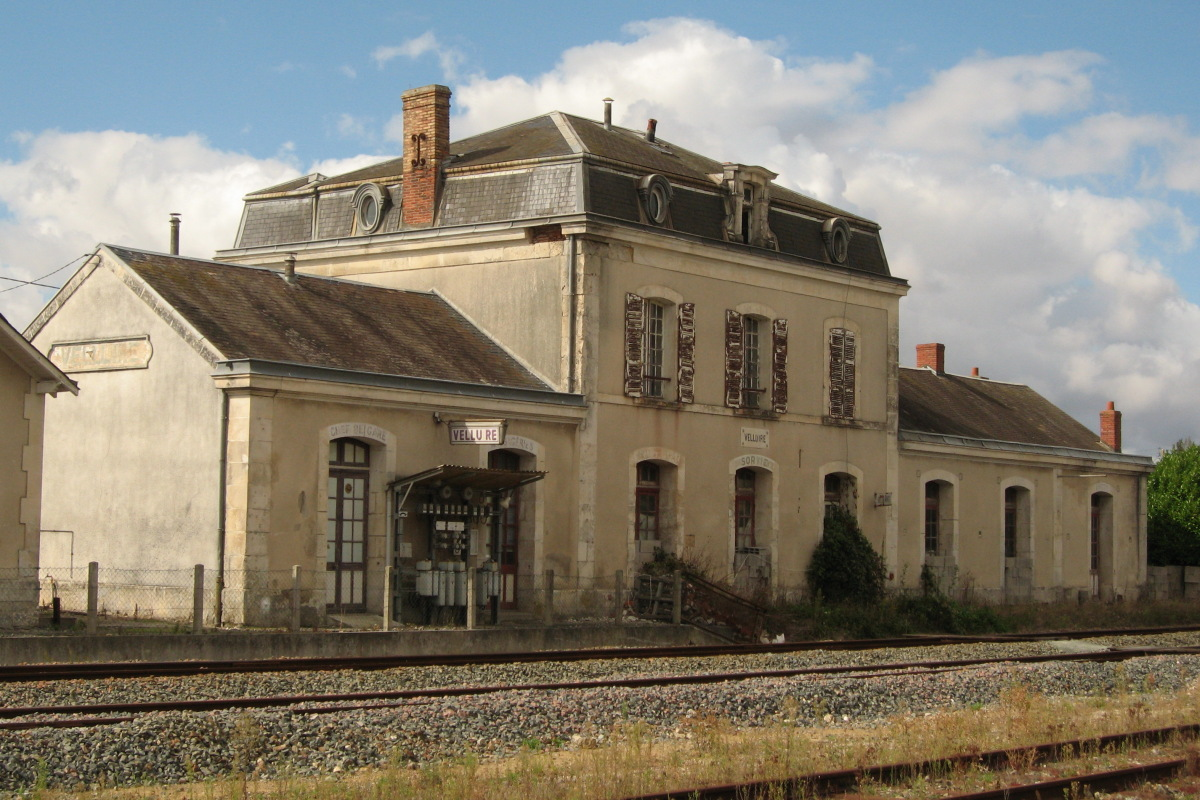
- The old station building of the Velluire railway station

- Coat of arms
- Location of Velluire
- Location within France Location within Pays de la Loire
- Coordinates: 46°24′19″N 0°53′34″W
- Country: France
- Region: Pays de la Loire
- Department: Vendée
- Arrondissement: Fontenay-le-Comte
- Canton: Fontenay-le-Comte
- Commune: Les Velluire-sur-Vendée
- Area^{1}: 9.54 km^{2} (3.68 sq mi)
- Highest elevation: 32 m (105 ft)
- Lowest elevation: 0 m (0 ft)
- Population (2022): 701
  - Density: 73.5/km^{2} (190/sq mi)
- Time zone: UTC+01:00 (CET)
  - Summer (DST): UTC+02:00 (CEST)
- Postal code: 85770
- ^{1} French Land Register data, which excludes lakes, ponds, glaciers > 1 km^{2} (0.386 sq mi or 247 acres) and river estuaries.

Velluire (French pronunciation: [vɛlɥiʁ]) is a former commune in the Vendée department in the Pays de la Loire region in western France. On 1 January 2019, it was merged into the new commune Les Velluire-sur-Vendée. The town lies on the river Vendée to the south west of Fontenay-le-Comte.

== See also ==
- Communes of the Vendée department
