= Gâtine Vendéenne =

Coordinates: 46.65°N 0.25°W

The Gâtine Vendéenne is a historical area in the west of France, around the town of Parthenay in the département of Deux-Sèvres. The area is hilly and wooded, distinguished by small fields and relatively poor land.

Several places in the Gâtine have names deriving from their location, including:

- La Boissière-en-Gâtine
- Mazières-en-Gâtine
- Saint-Paul-en-Gâtine
- Vernoux-en-Gâtine
