= Canton of Cerizay =

Coordinates: 46.82°N 0.67°W

The canton of Cerizay is an administrative division of the Deux-Sèvres department, western France. Its borders were modified at the French canton reorganisation which came into effect in March 2015. Its seat is in Cerizay.

It consists of the following communes:

1. L'Absie
2. Bretignolles
3. Cerizay
4. Chanteloup
5. La Chapelle-Saint-Laurent
6. Cirières
7. Clessé
8. Combrand
9. Courlay
10. La Forêt-sur-Sèvre
11. Largeasse
12. Moncoutant-sur-Sèvre
13. Montravers
14. Neuvy-Bouin
15. Le Pin
16. Saint-André-sur-Sèvre
17. Saint-Paul-en-Gâtine
18. Trayes
