= Route nationale 149 =

Route nationale in France

National road 149
- Route nationale 149

Route information
- Length: 77 km (48 mi)

Major junctions
- Northeast end: Bressuire
- Parthenay; Poitiers
- Southwest end: Migné-Auxances

Location
- Country: France

Highway system
- Roads in France; Autoroutes; Routes nationales

The Route nationale 149 (N149) is a trunk road (nationale) in western France.

== Bressuire to Parthenay (30km) ==
The RN149 starts at the end of the RN249 to the north west of Bressuire. The road then bypasses Bressuire as a dual carriageway before heading south east towards Parthenay. It cuts through the villages of Saint-Sauveur and Chiche before turning south, cutting across the D46 at Amailloux before coming into Parthenay. It then heads east, then south, around Châtillon-sur-Thouet and through a number of roundabouts, before heading east again towards Poitiers.

== Parthenay to Poitiers (46 km) ==
After a long stretch of country road outside of Parthenay which crosses the D165, the N149 meets the D121 and D22 in La Ferrière-en-Parthenay. The road then leads to Chalandray, where it intersects the D24 and goes towards Ayron. From Ayron, it moves onward, crossing the D92 and going another 1.5 km until it intersects with the D62 and D7 at Vouillé. The road soon crosses the D45, and, 2 km later, the D30, both of which go to Cissé. The road continues towards the outskirts of Poitiers in Migné-Auxances, where it terminates into the N147.

== History ==
The RN149 originally ran from Nantes, but has been bypassed by the RN249. The old RN149 has either been renumbered or downgraded to the D149.

== European Route E62 ==
European route E62 follows the N149 until it merges with the N147 at Poitiers.
