= W. E. W. Petter =

British aircraft designer (1908 – 1968)

William (Teddy) Petter
- photograph by Elliott & Fry in 1951
- Born: 8 August 1908; Highgate, north London
- Died: 1 May 1968 (aged 59); Béruges, France
- Education: Gonville and Caius College, Cambridge
- Spouse: Claude Marguerite Juliette Munier
- Children: 3 daughters
- Parent: Sir Ernest Willoughby Petter
- Engineering career
- Discipline: Aeronautics
- Employers: Westland Aircraft, English Electric, Folland Aircraft
- Significant design: Westland Lysander, Folland Gnat
- Significant advance: Canberra, Lightning
- Awards: John Bernard Seely Prize for Aeronautics; Fellow of the RAeS (1944); RAeS silver medal (1950); CBE (1951)

William Edward Willoughby "Teddy" Petter CBE FRAeS (8 August 1908, Highgate in Middlesex – 1 May 1968, Béruges) was a British aircraft designer. He is noted for Westland's wartime aeroplanes, as well as the Canberra, the early design of the Lightning, and his last plane, the Folland Gnat.

== Early life ==
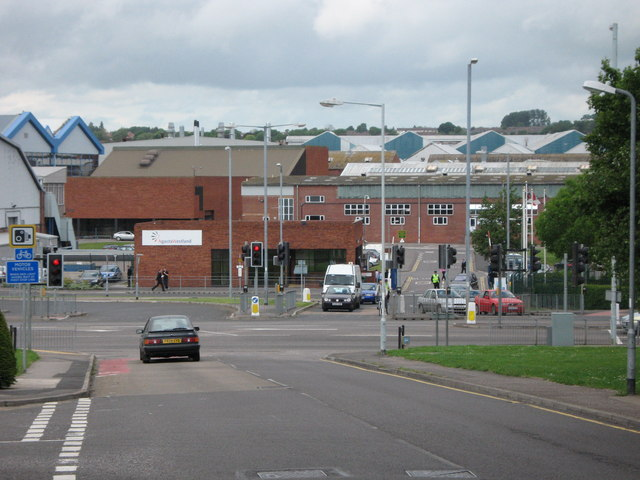
Westland Aircraft factory site in Yeovil in Somerset

Edward 'Teddy' Petter was the eldest of the three sons and one daughter of Sir Ernest Petter (co-founder of Westland Aircraft Works) and his wife, Angela Emma. (Note: For the origin of this Petter family in North Devon, see "Some men who made Barnstaple..." Pauline Brain 2010) Because his father spent much time in London, Teddy's early childhood was spent mostly with his mother, from whom he inherited a strong religious conviction and firm ethical principles. He was educated at Marlborough College in Wiltshire then Gonville and Caius College, Cambridge. During his first two years at Cambridge he focused his studies on subjects relevant to oil engines, the traditional product of Petters Limited, but in his third year he concentrated on aerodynamics and aircraft engineering. In 1929 he was awarded a first class in the mechanical sciences tripos and shared the John Bernard Seely prize in aeronautics.

== Career ==
=== Westland ===
==== Early career ====
Petter joined Westland Aircraft Works as a graduate apprentice in 1929 and for the next 2 1/2 years he worked in every department, not seeking any favour despite being the chairman's son. In the drawing office it was noted that he was a very poor draughtsman but had good ideas. Years later he said "I looked on this as sheer drudgery at the time, but knew afterwards that without workshop knowledge I would never have become a designer".

In May 1932 he was appointed personal assistant to the managing director, Robert Bruce, a position previously held by Petter's friend and colleague Harald Penrose. Bruce did not welcome the appointment and ignored him, leaving Petter spare time to modify and compete an Austin 7. Despite his interest in sports cars, Petter had no interest in learning to fly. Penrose gave him a flying lesson at this time, but later commented that Petter had a 'lack of the requisite sensitivity coupled with hopeless judgment of speed and distance'.

His father appointed Petter to the board in May 1934, making him technical director (at the age of 26) in preference over more experienced engineers such as Arthur Davenport and Geoffrey Hill. This was not welcomed by the older members of the management, ultimately prompting Bruce and Hill to resign, and placing the older and more experienced Davenport in an intolerable position as his subordinate. One of his first actions as technical director was to terminate development of Hill's Pterodactyl, a pioneering tailless swept-wing aircraft.

However, other business decisions by Ernest Petter infuriated Teddy. In July 1935 Ernest Petter convened a shareholders meeting to propose a merger with British Marine Aircraft for the purpose of expanding Westland's workshops. (Note: Ironically, British Marine Aircraft would become Folland Aircraft in 1937) This proposal was thwarted by Teddy and Peter Acland who threatened to resign. But in July 1938 Ernest Petter sold the controlling shares in Westlands to John Brown Ltd, forming Westland Aircraft Limited as a separate company, with Eric Mensforth brought in to share the managing directorship with Peter Acland. Teddy saw the loss of family control of the company as the loss of his birthright, and this dispute would divide the Petter family for years, not being resolved until shortly before Ernest Petter's death in 1954.

==== Lysander ====
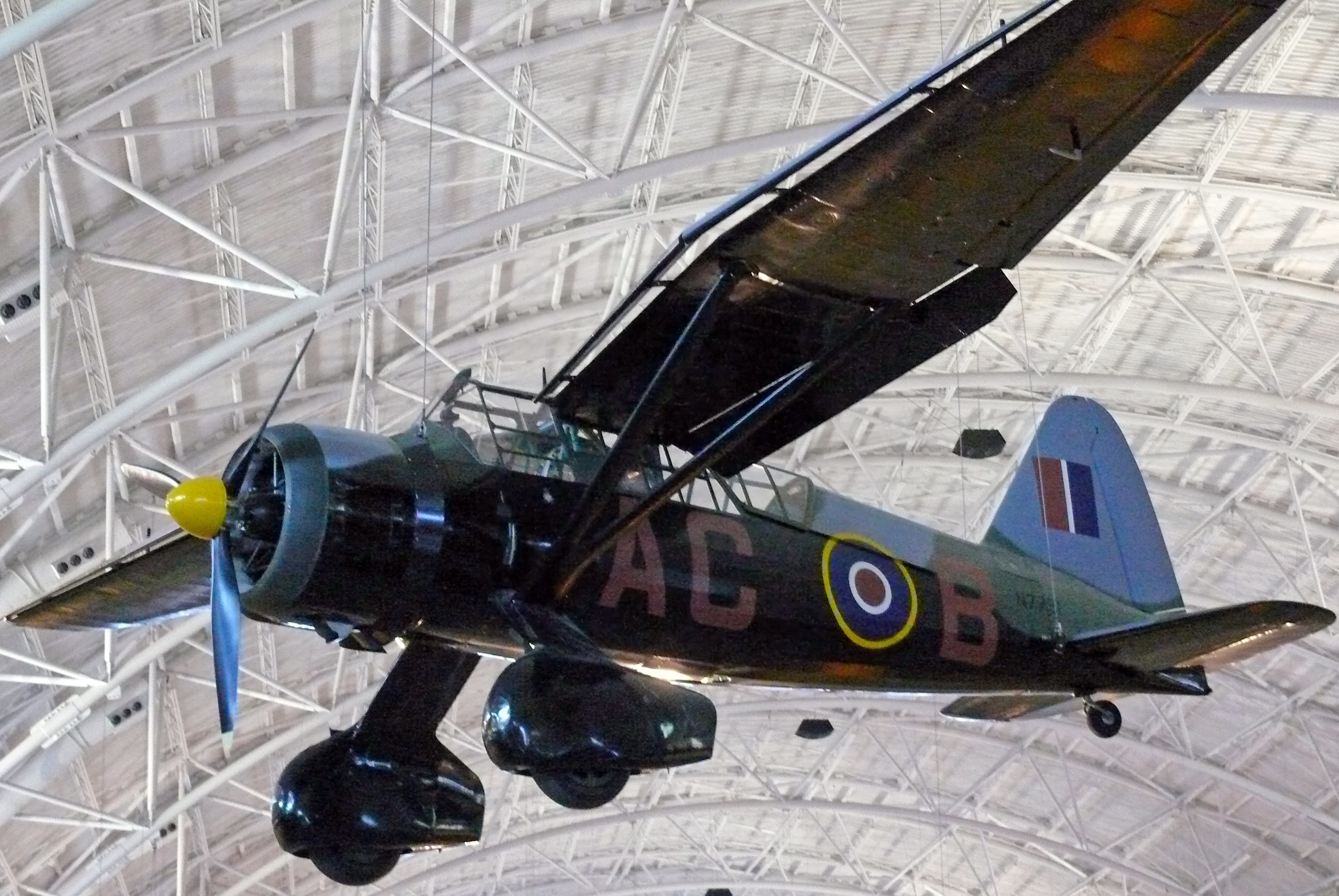
Westland Lysander at Steven F. Udvar-Hazy Center of NASM in Washington DC

The Air Ministry was initially reluctant to award Westland contracts due to Petter's inexperience, but his reputation as a successful designer was strengthened after it was demonstrated that the automatic slats on the PV 7 were both effective and reliable. As a result, and after internal discussion, the Air Ministry added Westland to the list of bidders for Specification A.39/34 (the replacement for the Hawker Hector army co-operation aircraft). Petter started the design by interviewing the Army Cooperation pilots and ground crew. Based on this information, he placed pilot visibility, the ability to take off and land in small spaces, and ease of ground maintenance as the prime requirements. The resulting design, the Westland P8 (later named the Lysander), was clearly an evolution of Westland's high-winged monoplane designs, but Petter incorporated a number of innovative features including extensive use of extruded sections throughout the airframe, something that would be a feature in his future designs.

The early flight testing revealed attitude control problems that the wind tunnel tests had not predicted. Petter instructed Penrose to conceal these problems from Ernest Petter. Later, when these problems had been addressed by a larger, variable-incidence tailplane, it was realised that if a landing was aborted and the throttle opened up fully, the Lysander could rear up and stall. While Penrose and RAF test pilots lobbied for modifications, Petter refused because redesign would affect production. Also, in his zeal to reduce weight, Petter had used glider fabric instead of specification Irish linen to cover the wings on the second prototype. This nearly caused a disaster when an RAF pilot dived it to the limit, causing the fabric on the top surface to tear off.

==== Whirlwind ====
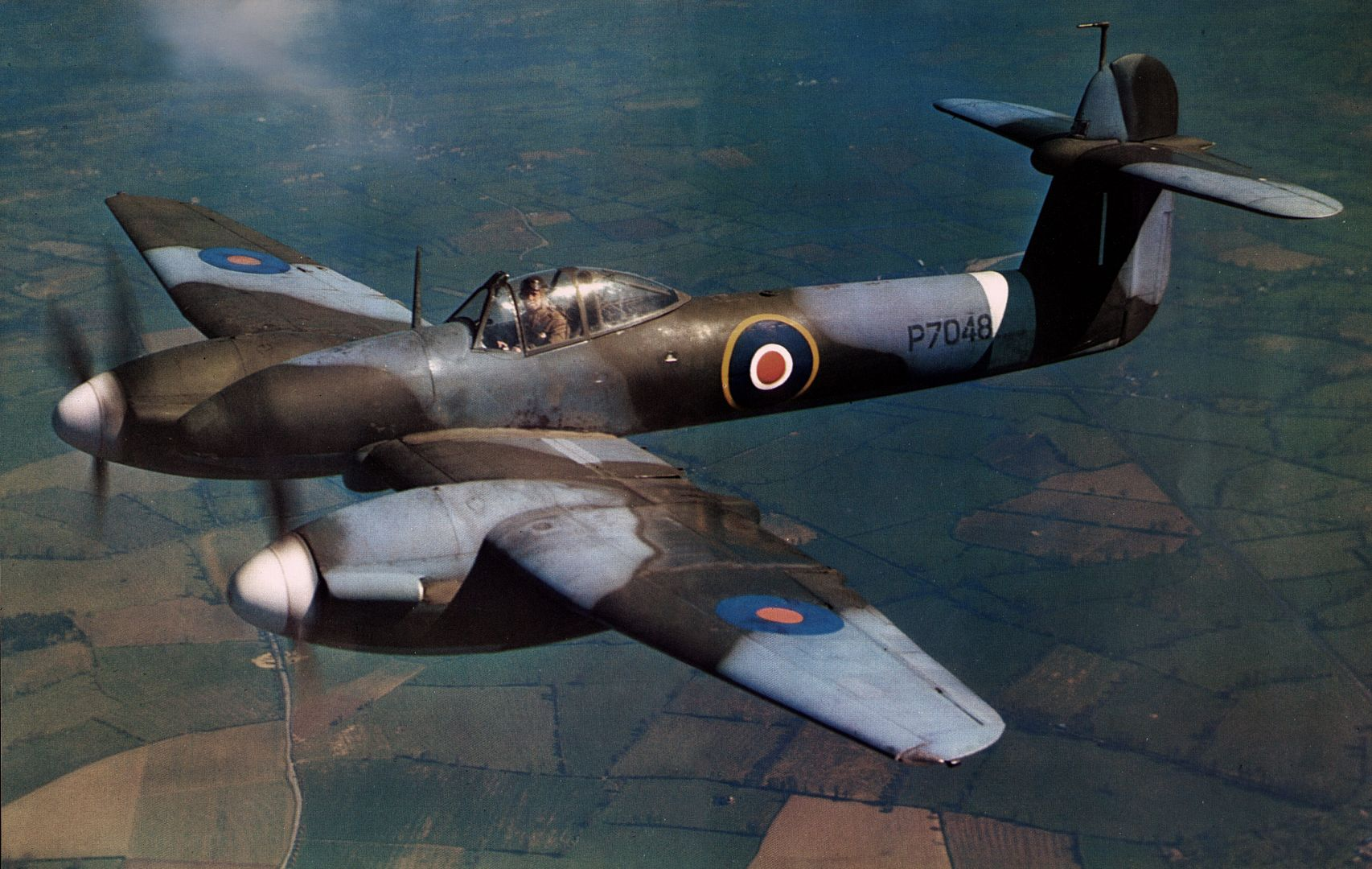
Westland Whirlwind

Petter's next fixed-wing aircraft design was a radical departure from the Westland's typical high-wing fabric-covered airframe. The Westland P9 was a low winged twin-engined aircraft employing the latest technology. It was designed to meet Air Ministry specification F.37/35, which called for a single-seat cannon-armed fighter, at least 40 mph faster than a contemporary bomber and not less than 330 mph at 15,000 ft. To obtain this performance Petter and Davenport chose to minimise drag; the two Rolls-Royce Peregrine engines were fitted in closely streamlined nacelles, and their radiators were fitted inside the wing inboard sections (something that would be later copied in the de Havilland Mosquito and the Hawker Tempest I). In the two prototypes the engine exhaust was routed through the fuel tanks in the wings to reduce parasitic drag. The Air Ministry thought that this was dangerous and insisted that conventional exhaust stacks be fitted. (Note: Penrose (1984 page 179) describes a test flight in the second prototype which nearly ended in disaster when a fractured exhaust pipe burnt through the aileron control rod.)

The airframe was of thin-walled stressed skin construction, with the rear fuselage skinned in magnesium alloy. Like the Lysander, it made extensive use of extrusions in the airframe. To reduce the landing distance the wing incorporated automatic Handley Page slats coupled to the Fowler Flaps, with the radiator grilles also coupled to the flap control, which was advanced at the time.

The prototype first flew in September 1938, and while it was one of the fastest and most heavily armed fighters of its era, faster than the Spitfire Mk 1, its development was problematic and protracted. The engines overheated, the hydraulic engine controls were imprecise, the slats slammed open, and production was slow.

Petter was frustrated by its lack of operational status in the RAF. In November 1940, he wrote a memo to Sholto Douglas stating "The Whirlwind is probably the most radically new aeroplane which has ever gone into service... New ideas I am afraid, even with the greatest care, always mean a certain amount of teething trouble... I really do not think these troubles have been any worse than they were on, say, the Spitfire... " In reply Sholto Douglas wrote, "... it seems to me that your firm is concentrating on producing large numbers of Lysanders, which nobody wants... instead of concentrating on producing Whirlwinds which are wanted badly." Shortly after this exchange 263 squadron became operational, but Petter always regretted that the Whirlwind was not available for the Battle of Britain and blamed Eric Mensforth for the delay in production.

==== Spitfire development ====
By 1942 Westland was building mostly Spitfires under contract. One of the problems with the early marks of Spitfire was variability of longitudinal stability, leading to aircraft getting dangerously out of control and contributing to the risk of structural failure . Petter made a significant contribution to improving the longitudinal stability of the Spitfire because he was the first to appreciate that aerodynamic modification to the elevator could provide additional stability. On his own initiative he had Penrose collect flight test stick force data and trim curves on a Spitfire at various centre of gravity loadings, then produced a prototype elevator with a bulged aerodynamic section, which produced a 'remarkable' improvement in stability, later being known as the 'Westland Elevator'.

==== Welkin ====
In 1940, the Air Ministry was motivated by the threat of high altitude bombers such as the Junkers Ju 86P, to issue a specification for a high altitude interceptor, F4/40, followed by a revision F7/41 in 1941. Petter submitted two designs. His first was an innovative low-drag aircraft (P13), which featured a pair of staggered Merlins in the fuselage, one behind and slightly above the other, driving a pair of contra-rotating propellers. His second submission was a conventional design (P14), describing it as 'a logical development of the successful Whirlwind...". This was selected and became the Welkin.

Specification F7/41 required a minimum speed to 415 mph (668 km/h) at 33,000 ft (10,000 m) with a maximum ceiling of 42,000 ft (13,000 m). The Air Ministry also wanted low altitude manoeuvrability and a +9G ultimate load factor. The speed was equivalent to a Mach number of 0.62 while the loading condition caused Petter to select a thick wing section which would later be demonstrated to have a critical Mach number of 0.6. The significance of the thick wing section may not have been understood by Petter because compressibility effects had only started to be encountered by aircraft designers. (Note: Roland Beamont states that George Bulman was probably the first pilot among the allied nations to describe the effects of compressibility on aircraft handing in a memorandum at Langley in 1943) During test flying the effect of compressibility was experienced by Penrose who wrote, "In speed runs at the ceiling the wings and fuselage sometimes shook as though the machine was bumping over cobblestones." Petter was reluctant to believe Penrose or accept that the wing would not be acceptable for high speed at altitude.

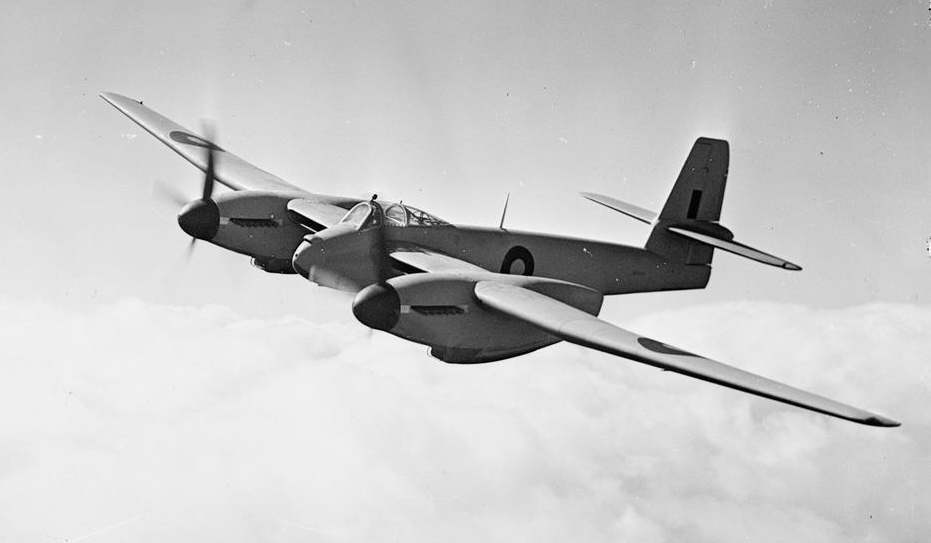
Welkin Mark I, DX318, in flight

While the cabin pressurisation was innovative and worked well, the heat from the compressor "was like sitting in an oven". Petter was unconcerned and reluctant to modify the system, Penrose thought that "It was the machine's performance which interested him, not that of the pilot". Petter devised a better method for cooling the cabin only after Penrose developed pneumonia attributed to this problem.

Penrose said later that "At this time Petter's intellect put him ahead of most contemporary designers as shown by his introduction of pressurization and extensive use of remote electrical controls which subsequently became standard practice. By the time of the Welkin he had learnt the lesson that it takes as long to develop an aeroplane as to design it... Petter was an outstanding organiser and could envisage construction time-scales with greater knowledge than Fearn and Wheeldon. (Note: John 'Daddy' Fearn and Edward Wheeldon were Westland's 'Works Manager and Works Superintendent. Together they were responsible for production) ...it was his lack of understanding people and their motives that became his major failure." After the Welkin was developed, on 6 January 1943, the Controller o Research & Development at MAP wrote “Petter, now that he has grown up, looks like turning into one of our best designers”

==== B1/44 proposal ====
Westland's successful manufacture of Spitfires meant that Petter was well thought of by Sir Wilfrid Freeman, chief executive officer at the Ministry of Aircraft Production (MAP) and by N. E. Rowe, its director of technical development. Discussions between all three led to Specification B1/44 for a jet-powered replacement for the de Havilland Mosquito bomber. Petter developed his proposal for B1/44 as a private venture. This was a 56 ft span medium bomber powered by two Metrovick F.2/4 "Beryl" engines located within the fuselage and he persuaded the Westland board to put up capital to manufacture a mockup of the fuselage. This was his fifteenth wartime design study and his final design for Westland.

Throughout his career when under stress, Petter would leave work without warning for periods of up to six weeks. In April 1944 he suddenly left work and it was rumoured that he had travelled to Switzerland, possibly to a monastery or a religious commune. In his absence Mensford switched the design effort from the B1/44 bomber to work on specification N11/44 for a Naval single-seat fighter that would eventually become the Wyvern.

When Petter returned he was furious with Mensford. He knew Westland would not have the resources to develop and build both the fighter and the bomber. Also, to avoid the delays in production of the bomber he wanted Mensforth to give him full powers of a chief engineer responsible for every department concerned with its construction. He believed that in his absence the management had conspired to eliminate his project. As a result of this conflict he resigned in June, leaving the company in September 1944. He took with him the B1/44 design proposal and his large database of extrusions with their load capacities.

=== English Electric ===
==== Canberra ====
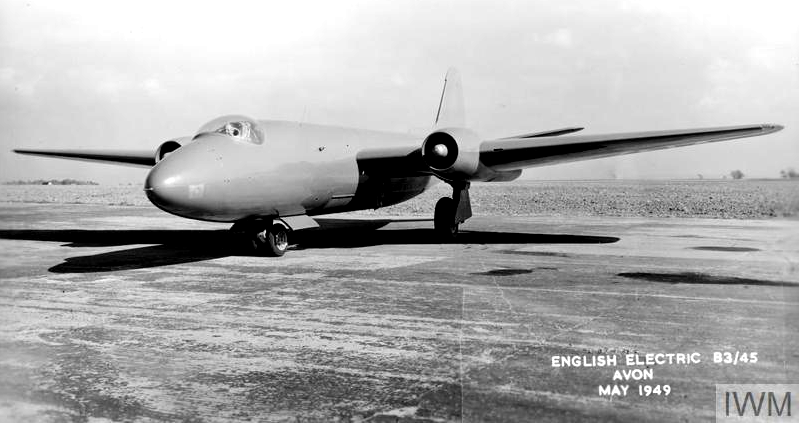
First prototype Canberra, then known by B3/45 specification at the time of the maiden flight (May 1949)

By 1944 English Electric was established as a leading manufacturer of modern aircraft, both in terms of quantity and quality. This success was certainly due in part to the drive of the Preston site general manager, Arthur Sheffield. However, the company did not have engineers capable of original aircraft design and to address this deficiency Sir George Nelson, English Electric's chairman, was introduced to Petter, (possibly by Sir Wilfred Freeman or Sir Ralph Sorley). With Petter on board, English Electric was put on the MAP short list to develop Britain's first jet bombers.

Petter started work for English Electric in July 1944. As he was unencumbered by an existing design office, he had the opportunity to personally recruit a team of ambitious young engineers. His first recruit was Frederick Page, who was then a senior aerodynamicist at Hawker Aircraft. Petter first discussed the B1/44 proposal with Page in October 1944, and appointed him as his chief stress man the following April.

In 1945, Petter proposed a study contract to the MAP for a high-speed, high-altitude bomber to an updated specification (B3/45). This was granted in June allowing Petter and Page to establish the basic B3/45 configuration. While the original Westland B1/44 design had incorporated engines inside the fuselage, they realised this was incompatible with the internal fuel and bomb load. Instead they chose engines mounted in nacelles in the wings. Petter later explained that the technical solution was found to lie in the right choice of wing. Swept wings had been considered, but were found to be unnecessary at the Mach numbers attainable when carrying a useful military load with the thrust available from two contemporary turbojets. The problems that the Welkin had encountered at altitude were avoided by choosing a wing with a low aspect-ratio allowing a modest thickness/chord ratio, together with a light wing-loading. The modest curvature of the wings meant that the intersection with the fuselage and nacelles required no fillets to smooth the flow. By late 1945 the design was sufficiently developed for a brochure to be submitted to the Ministry of Supply (MoS) which awarded a contract for four prototypes in January 1946.

The study contract in June 1945 enabled Petter to recruit and expand his team. (Note: The postwar Control of Employment Act restricted recruitment to only companies that had contracts.) He recruited Dai Ellis and Ray Creasey in 1946 as his aerodyamicists. He recruited Roland Beamont in May 1947 as his chief experimental test pilot; doing this as a means of bypassing Arthur Sheffield's control of the production test pilots and also because both he and Page wanted close integration of the test pilot within the design team. Members of the team Petter put together to develop the Canberra would go on to lead military aircraft development in the UK for the next four decades, playing significant roles in the development of the Lightning, BAC TSR-2, SEPECAT Jaguar, and the Panavia Tornado, some becoming members of the divisional board of directors.

Of this time at Warton, Beamont said "although Petter was generally thought to be difficult I found him logical and 'ahead of the game' and totally oriented on making an enormous success of the Canberra. That it achieved this was due to his personal ability to recognise the technical argument and act on it correctly."

The aircraft would stay in operation in the RAF for 57 years until June 2006. In the United States, the Martin Company built the design under licence from 1953, as the Martin B-57, which was operated by the United States Air Force (USAF), NASA, the Pakistan Air Force and Taiwan Air Force. While the type was retired by the USAF in 1983, NASA still operates three.

==== Lightning ====
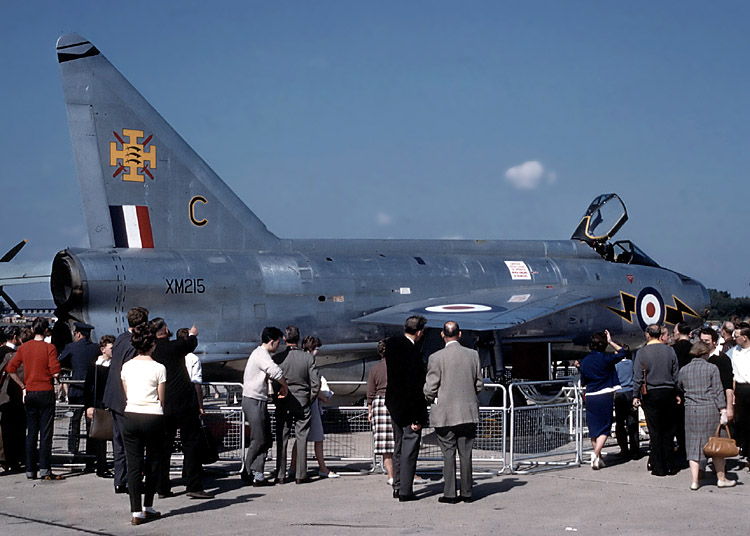
English Electric Lightning XM215 at Farnborough in 1964

Despite the lack of enthusiasm for manned supersonic flight in postwar Britain (The Miles M.52 was cancelled in February 1946), Petter made provisional sketches for a supersonic fighter in 1946. To achieve a small frontal area and reduce wave drag it had two Rolls-Royce Derwent engines mounted one above the other in the fuselage, echoing his earlier Westland P13 proposal. He lobbied Whitehall on the matter of supersonic flight and in 1948 Handel Davis and a party from the MoS visited Petter in Warton to discuss experimental supersonic development work under specification E.R. 103. This meeting resulted in Petter initiating a design proposal with Page leading the design and Ray Creasey responsible for the aerodynamics. By July 1948 their proposal incorporated the stacked engine configuration and a high-mounted tailplane but was designed for Mach 1.5. As a consequence it had a conventional 40° degree swept wing This proposal was submitted in the November and in January 1949 the project was designated P.1 by English Electric. On 29 March 1949 MoS granted approval for English Electric to start the detailed design, develop wind tunnel models and build a full-size mockup. The design that had developed during 1948 evolved further during 1949. To achieve Mach 2 the wing sweep was increased to 60° with the ailerons moved to the wingtips. In late 1949 low-speed wind tunnel tests showed that a vortex was generated by the wing which caused a large downwash on the tailplane; this issue was solved by lowering its height below the wing. Hence, by late 1949 the basic configuration of the P.1A Lightning was fixed.

By late 1949 the relationship between Sheffield's Preston Strand Road engineering works and Petter's design team at Warton had deteriorated. Modifications to the Canberra to incorporate a bomb aimer, camera bays and dual seat for the navigation trainer required a redesign of the front fuselage, which caused disruption in the design office and the workshops. In addition, with the P.1A Lightning design programme ramping up, Petter demanded a separate administration for Warton and an experimental workshop under his control as a condition of his continued service with English Electric. Sir George Nelson was unable to reach a compromise acceptable to both Petter and Sheffield. Page tried to persuade Petter to stay by promising to help in dealing with Sheffield. From December 1949 Petter ceased to take an active part in running Warton, he visited Warton once again to speak to a few people and clear his office. Page took over the day-to-day management until in February 1950, Petter resigned and Page was formally appointed his successor.

The Lightning remains the only all-British Mach 2 aircraft.

=== Folland Aircraft ===
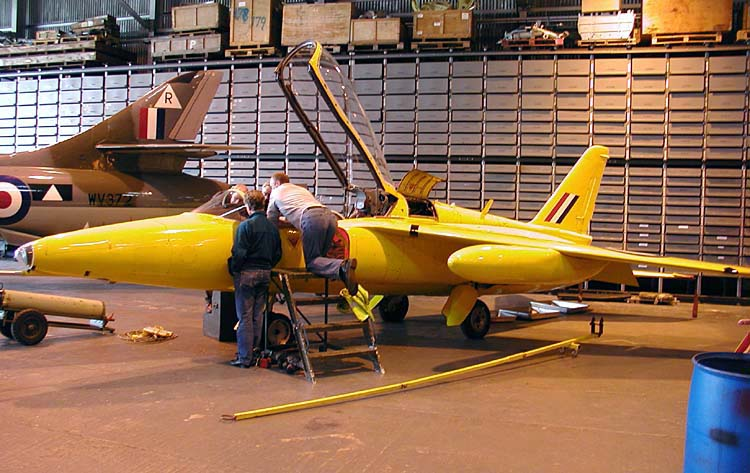
Privately owned Folland Gnat

In the late 1940s Folland Aircraft Limited in Hamble, Hampshire was manufacturing sub-assemblies for other aircraft manufacturers. Henry Folland planned to retire and recruited Petter as chief engineer and deputy managing director. Petter joined Folland in September 1950, succeeding Henry Folland as managing director in July 1951. Although Petter had entered into an anti-poaching agreement with English Electric, a number of his ex-colleagues joined Folland when positions were openly advertised. With a strong team, led by a designer of Petter's pedigree, Folland was now able to win MoS design contracts, such as that for the development of the Red Dean air-to-air missile in mid-1951.

On 11 July 1951 a delegation from the RAF visited Petter to discuss the requirements for a lightweight interceptor to counter the threat of escorted Russian Tupolev Tu-4 bombers (AST OR/303). To address this, Petter developed a number of concepts. His early designs used jettisonable engines but by late 1951 he had focussed on more conventional designs; the Fo 139 and Fo 140 (which would eventually be developed into the Midge and Gnat respectively). With concept design work on the light fighter ramping up, Petter decided not to proceed with the Red Dean and the MoS cancelled the contract in November 1951.

Petter sent a brochure describing the Fo.140 to the Air Staff in January 1952, but beyond this, further development of the light fighters was hindered by the lack of engines with a high thrust-to-weight ratio. The Bristol Saturn was cancelled, the Armstrong Siddeley Viper had insufficient thrust and Rolls-Royce had neither a suitable engine nor the inclination to develop one. To address this problem Petter approached Stanley Hooker at Bristol in late 1952 to discuss the design of a suitable engine. This meeting would lead to the development of the Orpheus.

By 1952 Government interest in a light fighter had waned. Despite this Petter began the design and construction of the prototype as a private venture. The Fo 139 design was revised, adopting a shoulder-mounted wing and a low-set tailplane. In common with his previous designs, Petter made use of magnesium alloys in the structure, using material surplus from the RTV2 Missile programme in the construction of the Midge prototype.

In June 1953 Petter presented his manifesto on light fighter design at the AFITA congress at the Paris Air show. In this paper, titled "Design for Production", Petter compared a 2500 kg light fighter with a 7500 kg standard fighter and concluded that although the weight ratio was 3:1, four times as many light fighters could be manufactured for the same cost. To achieve this he explained how the fuselage, wing structure, engine and services could all be simplified.

Colonel Johnnie Driscoll, head of the NATO Mutual Weapons Development Program noted Petter's light fighter concept. NATO was interested in ground-attack aircraft that could be operated from improvised airfields and could be manufactured by postwar European industry. Driscoll formalised a NATO requirement in August 1954 that would become the NATO light fighter competition. It was based on Petter's concept but included the requirement to use low-pressure tyres. However, the Gnat was designed to operate from concrete runways and used high-pressure tyres. Petter refused to modify the undercarriage because this would mean bulging the undercarriage doors and spoiling the Gnat's clean aerodynamic lines. Stanley Hooker urged him to 'Just say that you will try to do it', but Petter's moral code would not let him make false claims. As a result, the Gnat was eliminated from the competition in June 1955. Ironically, the Gnat trainer design would show that the wider tyres could be used without increasing drag.

Production of the Midge progressed to schedule and it was rolled out of the workshop on 31 July 1954, making its maiden flight on 11 August 1954. The Gnat first flew on 18 July 1955 and while it was demonstrated to be a capable aircraft, there was little interest in it in Europe. In November 1955 the Indian government showed an interest in both purchasing and in licensed manufacture. Petter made several visits to India and he and his design team were highly regarded by HAL. An approach was made to him to set up a design team in India.However, his relationship with Indian government officials was antagonistic due to arguments over variations in contract costs.

In the late 1950s Petter rationalised his senior staff, dismissing those he thought had failed to meet his standards. However at the same time the Macmillan government was rationalising the aircraft industry and made the order for Gnat Trainers conditional on Folland merging with the Hawker Siddeley group. Such a merger would effectively make Petter subordinate to Sir Sidney Camm, with whom Petter had a good relationship (Camm had provided Petter with the Hawker Hunter wind tunnel data during the development of the Gnat) but the working relationship would be intolerable. At the same period his wife Claude was showing the early signs of Parkinson's disease. These two factors prompted Petter to announce his resignation to the Hawker Siddeley board on 11 November 1959, leaving Folland in the December.

== Personal life and retirement ==
Throughout his education at Marborough and Cambridge Petter seems to have led a reclusive life. At Cambridge he had one close friend, John McCowan, with whom he shared an interest in motor cars. It was during a stay at the McCowan family farm that Petter met his future wife Claude, the daughter of Louis Munier a Swiss official at the League of Nations in Geneva. Teddy and Claude were married in August 1933, in her home town near Geneva, with McCowan as their best man. The Petters had three daughters, Camile in 1936, Francoise in 1938 and Jenni in 1945. While living in Dorset in the 1930s he designed his own house, a modern wooden chalet, with oil heating, double glazing and an automatic garage door.

When he left Folland he had intended to continue as a consultant engineer, with a limited interest in the Gnat. However, in January 1960 Petter left the aircraft industry completely, stating "I have finished with aviation completely. I have strong religious interests to which I am now going to give a lot of my time."

‌Five years earlier, Claude had been introduced to a 'Father Forget', a former minister of the Reformed Church of France who claimed to be able to cure her Parkinson's disease through communal prayer. With Claude and daughter Jenni, Teddy Petter joined Father Forget's commune in 1960 and moved to Switzerland. There he lived the simple life of a holy man until in May 1968 he died, aged 59, of bleeding from a chronic stomach ulcer. He was buried in Beruges, Poitou-Charentes, in France. Claude died in 1975.

To commemorate him a road named Petter Court has been created in BAE Systems' Enterprise Zone at the site of the old Samlesbury Aerodrome in Lancashire.

== Patents ==
- US application 2841346, William Edward Willoughby Petter, "Jet-propelled aircraft", published 1 June 1958, assigned to Folland Aircraft Ltd

== See also ==
- Barnes Wallis
