= Léon de Poncins =

French journalist and writer

- Born: Gabriel Léon Marie Pierre de Montaigne de Poncins; 3 November 1897; Civens, Loire, France
- Died: 18 December 1975 (aged 78); Toulon, France
- Occupations: Journalist, writer
- Movement: Judeo-Masonic conspiracy theory

Viscount Léon de Poncins (3 November 1897 – 18 December 1975) was a French aristocrat and a traditional Catholic journalist and essayist. He authored numerous books and articles advancing a Judeo-Masonic conspiracy theory.

Léon de Poncins' explanation for most of the major revolutionary political upheavals of modernity was the influence of certain secret societies with an anti-Christian agenda — as well as an "occult war" waged by those possessing a diabolical kind of "faith".

== Biography ==
Born Gabriel Léon Marie Pierre de Montaigne de Poncins in Civens, Loire. He was descended of an aristocratic family ennobled in 1696.

His writings enjoyed some prominence in the 1930s (many of his works were translated into English, Italian, German, and Spanish). Léon de Poncins contributed to many newspapers like Le Jour, Le Figaro, L'Ami du peuple, and Le Nouvelliste; he also directed the journal Contre-Révolution (Counter-Revolution) from 1937 to 1939.

Léon de Poncins was a devout Catholic and counter-revolutionary. His writings show anti-Jewish, anti-Communist, anti-Masonic, and anti-progressive views. Until his death, in Toulon, he denounced occult forces and organizations that he claimed ruled the world and sought to poison Catholicism.

== Views ==
=== Influence of secret societies ===
In his writings, he denounced Masonic conspiracies (pointing out the relationship between Freemasonry and the French Revolution, the League of Nations, etc.), and the Jewish influence in Catholic affairs.

His work was seen as a continuation of the Revue Internationale des Sociétés Secrètes (International Review of Secret Societies), whose primary editor was Mgr. Ernest Jouin (1844–1932).

Léon de Poncins was a friend of Emmanuel Malynski (died 1938)— with whom he wrote La Guerre occulte (The Occult War)— and Jean Vaquié (1911–1992), with whom he wrote in the journals Lectures françaises and Lecture et Tradition, and for the Chiré-en-Montreuil-based publishing house Éditions de Chiré. Léon de Poncins wrote the preface to Vaquié's La Révolution Liturgique ([The Liturgical Revolution]).

Julius Evola translated La Guerre occulte into Italian.

In a 1949 letter from René Guenon to Evola, he expresses a belief that Léon de Poncins was subjected to attacks from "a group of dangerous sorcerers" who were connected to his secretary, Eve Louguet.

=== On World War I ===
In his historical analysis of the First World War, Léon de Poncins suggests that concerted lobbying by international Zionist circles led to the creation of the future Jewish state in Palestine by means of manipulating alliances and oppositions between countries. In 1916— at a time when Germany triumphed on all fronts and the British planned to sign an armistice then advanced by the Kaiser— Zionists secured a promise of Palestine (then under the domination of the Ottoman Empire) as a Jewish settlement from the government of Britain in exchange for the United States' entry into the war alongside the Triple Entente. To corroborate his thesis, Léon de Poncins cited Great Britain, The Jews and Palestine, a 1936 book by pro-Zionist author, Samuel Landman.

=== On Vatican II ===
During the Second Vatican Council, following the vote on 20 November 1964, at the third session of the provisional scheme dealing with the Church's attitude towards Judaism, Léon de Poncins wrote a pamphlet, Le Problème juif face au Concile (The Jewish Question Facing the Council), which was distributed to the bishops before the fourth and final session. The author noted "by the Council Fathers a profound misunderstanding of what constitutes the essence of Judaism." Léon de Poncins' advice had a significant effect on the drafting of Nostra aetate, adopted on 28 October 1965.

== Works ==
Year	Title	Translated title	Publishing notes	ISBN
1928	Les Forces secrètes de la Révolution	The Secret Powers Behind Revolution: Freemasonry and Judaism	Bossard. Second revised and expanded edition, 1929. Boswell (London; English translation), 1929. Reprinted by Christian Book Club of America (Hawthorne, CA), 1969, 1980, 1988, and 1996. Bloomfield Books (Sudbury, Suffolk), 1989. Published as Freemasonry & Judaism: Secret Powers Behind Revolution by A & B Books Publishers (Brooklyn, NY), 1994. Reprinted by Éditions Saint-Remi, 2005.	ISBN 2845194870
1931	Refusé par la presse	[Rejected by the Press]	Éditions de la Revue française. Reprinted by Éditions Saint-Remi	ISBN 2845194307
1932	La Franc-maçonnerie, puissance occulte	[Freemasonry: Secret Power]	Bossard. Reprinted by Éditions Saint-Remi, 2005	ISBN 2845194986
1932	Les Juifs, maîtres du monde	[The Jews: Masters of the World]	Bossard. Reprinted by Éditions Saint-Remi, 2005	ISBN 2845194854
1934	Tempête sur le monde, ou La Faillite du progrès	[Storm on the World, or the Bankruptcy of Progress]	Beauchesne. Reprinted by Éditions Saint-Remi, 2005	ISBN 284519482X
1934	La Dictature des puissances occultes, La Franc-maçonnerie d'après ses documents secrets	[The Dictatorship of Occult Powers: Freemasonry from its Secret Documents	Beauchesne et Fils éditeurs. Reprinted by Éditions Saint-Remi (with the title La Dictature des Puissances Occultes — La F∴M∴ ([The Dictatorship of Occult Powers— The F∴M∴]), . Second edition by Beauchesne et Fils éditeurs, 1936. Third edition by Beauchesne et Fils éditeurs, 1942. Fourth edition by Diffusion de la Pensée Française, 1972. Fifth edition by Diffusion de la Pensée Française, 1975. Sixth edition by Éditions de Chiré, 2014 (revised and updated from the 1972 edition)	ISBN 2-84519-948-1
1936	Le Portugal renaît	[Portugal Reborn]	Beauchesne et Fils éditeurs. Reprinted by Éditions Saint-Remi, 2005	ISBN 2845194935
1936	Société des Nations, super État maçonnique	[The League of Nations: Super Masonic State]	Beauchesne. Reprinted by Éditions Saint-Remi	ISBN 2845194846
1936	La Mystérieuse internationale juive	[The Mysterious International Jew]	Beauchesne. Reprinted by Éditions Saint-Remi	ISBN 2845195699
1936	La Guerre occulte (with Emmanuel Malynski)	The Occult War	Beauchesne. Reprinted by Éditions Saint-Remi. English translation published by Logik, 2015.	ISBN 2845194978; ISBN 9187339358
1937	Histoire secrète de la révolution espagnole	[The Secret History of the Spanish Revolution]	Beauchesne et Fils éditeurs. Reprinted by Éditions Saint-Remi	ISBN 2845194897
1939	Le Plan communiste d'insurrection armée	[The Communist Plan for Armed Insurrection]	Mercure de France. Reprinted by Éditions Saint-Remi	ISBN 2845194943
1939	La liberté de la presse et la question juive. Les décrets-loi Marchandeau	[Freedom of the Press and the Jewish Question: The decree-law Marchandeau]	Contre-Révolution	
1941	La Franc-Maçonnerie contre la France	[Freemasonry Against France]	Beauchesne. Reprinted by Éditions Saint-Remi	ISBN 2-84519-496-X
1942	Israël, destructeur d'empires	[Israel: Destroyer of Empires]	Mercure de France. Reprinted by Éditions Saint-Remi, 2005	ISBN 2845194927
1942	L'Énigme communiste	[The Communist Enigma]	Beauchesne et Fils éditeurs	
1943	Forces occultes	[Occult Forces]	Édition de la Légion Française des Combattants et des Volontaires de la Révolution nationale	
1943	Les Forces occultes dans le monde moderne	[Occult Forces in the Modern World]	Mercure de France. Reprinted by Éditions Saint-Remi	ISBN 2845194889
1961	Espions soviétiques dans le monde	[Soviet Spies in the World]	Nouvelles Éditions Latines. Reprinted by Éditions Saint-Remi, 2005	ISBN 2845194838
1965	Le Problème juif face au Concile (pamphlet)	The Jewish Question Facing the Council	Britons Publishing Company (London; printed in France)	
1967	Le Judaïsme et le Vatican. Une tentative de subversion spirituelle?	Judaism and the Vatican: An Attempt at Spiritual Subversion	Britons Publishing Company (London; translated from the French by Timothy Tindal-Robertson); Omni Publications (Hawthorne, CA), 1990. Liberty Bell Publications (Reedy, WV), 1990s. Éditions Saint-Remi (translated back into French), 2000. A&B Publishers Group (Brooklyn, NY), 1994 and 2000. Christian Book Club of America (Palmdale, CA), 2004. LITOO, 2007	ISBN 2845190654; ISBN 2755302593
1968		Freemasonry and the Vatican: A Struggle for Recognition	Britons Publishing Company (London; translated from the French manuscript by Timothy Tindal-Robertson). A&B Publishers Group (Brooklyn, NY), 1994 and 2000. Texte en ligne, Éditions Saint-Remi, 2000.	ISBN 1881316912
1969	Christianisme et Franc-maçonnerie	[Christianity and Freemasonry]	L'Ordre Français. Second edition by Diffusion de la Pensée Française, 1975. Third edition by Éditions de Chiré, 2010	
1970	Infiltrations ennemies dans l'Église (with Edith Delamare)	[Enemy Infiltration in the Church]	La librairie française	
1972	Top Secret: Secrets d'état anglo-américains	State Secrets: A Documentation of the Secret Revolutionary Mainspring Governing Anglo-American Politics	Diffusion de la Pensée Française (Vouillé). Britons Publishing Company (Chulmleigh), 1975. Sons of Liberty (Metairie, LA), 1977. Liberty Bell Publications (Reedy, WV), 1977	
1973	Histoire du communisme, de 1917 à la deuxième guerre mondiale	[History of Communism from 1917 to World War II]	Diffusion de la Pensée Française (magazine reissue of L'énigme communiste parue from 1942)	
	Les Documents Morgenthau	[The Morgenthau Documents]	Éditions Saint-Remi	ISBN 2845194900
	Le Communisme contre la France	[Communism Against France]	Éditions Saint-Remi	ISBN 2845194951
2014	Les Juifs et le Concile Vatican II	[The Jews and the Second Vatican Council]	Éditions Kontre Kulture (Saint-Denis)	ISBN 236725057X
