= Maillé =

Maillé may refer to the following places in France:

- Maillé, Indre-et-Loire, a commune in the Indre-et-Loire department, site of a 1944 war crime
- Maillé, Vendée, a commune in the Vendée department
- Maillé, Vienne, a commune in the Vienne department

== See also ==
- Maille (disambiguation)
