= Boivre =

River in western France

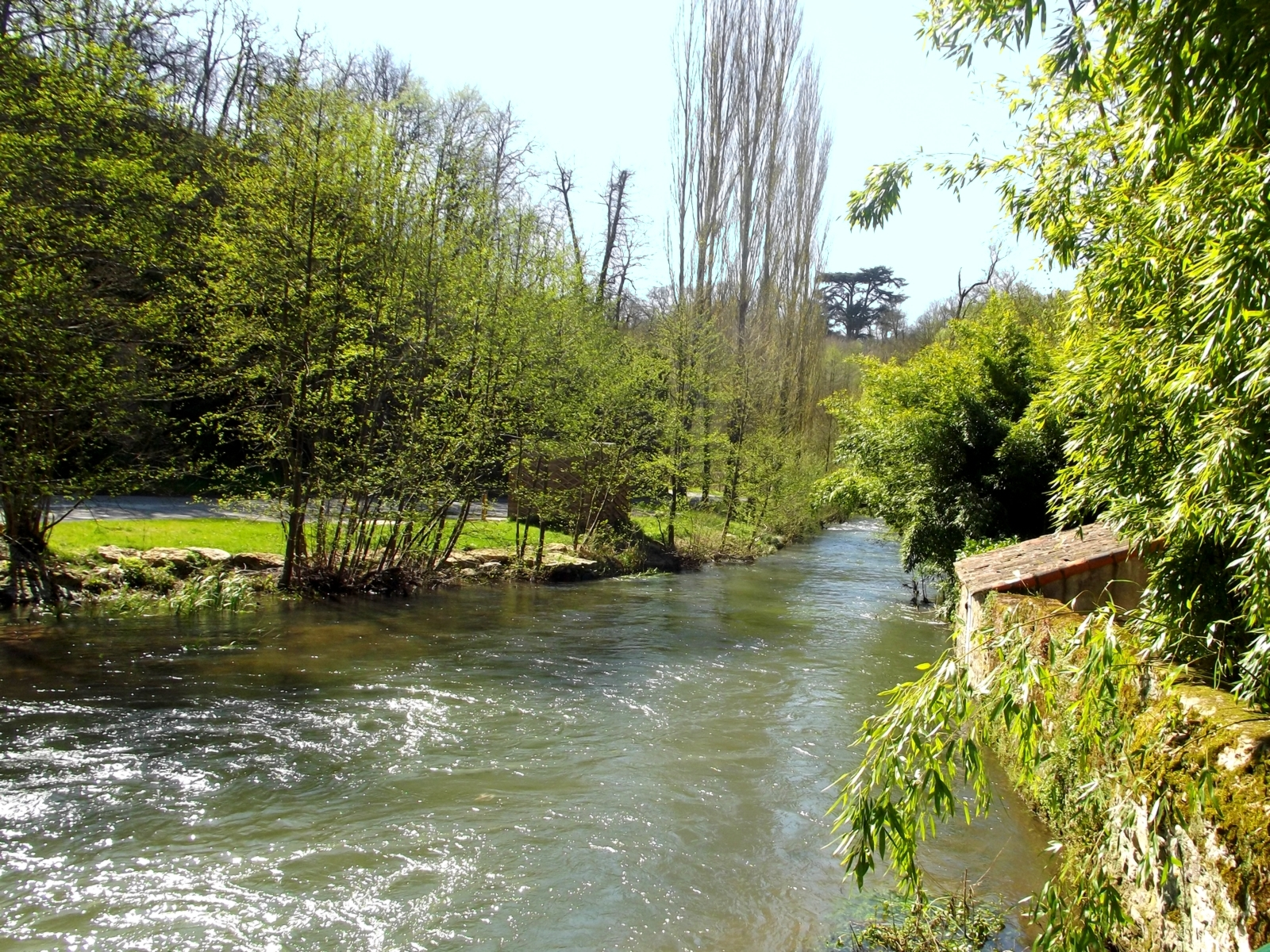

- Location within France Location within Nouvelle-Aquitaine

Location
- Country: France

Physical characteristics
- Source
  - location: Poitou
- Mouth
  - location: Clain
  - coordinates: 46°35′28″N 0°20′28″E
- Length: 46.1 km (28.6 mi)
- Basin size: 200 km^{2} (77 sq mi)
- Discharge
  - average: 1.07 m^{3}/s (38 cu ft/s) (at Vouneuil-sous-Biard)

Basin features
- Progression: Clain→ Vienne→ Loire→ Atlantic Ocean

The Boivre (French pronunciation: [bwavʁ]) is a 46.1 km (28.6 mi) long river in western France, a left tributary of the Clain. Its source is near Vasles, in the Deux-Sèvres department.

The Boivre flows through the following departments and towns:

- Deux-Sèvres: Vasles
- Vienne: Benassay, Lavausseau, La Chapelle-Montreuil, Montreuil-Bonnin, Béruges, Vouneuil-sous-Biard, Biard and Poitiers

It joins the Clain at Poitiers.
