= Lavausseau =

- Part of Boivre-la-Vallée
- Location of Lavausseau
- Location within France Location within Nouvelle-Aquitaine
- Coordinates: 46°33′37″N 0°04′27″E
- Country: France
- Region: Nouvelle-Aquitaine
- Department: Vienne
- Arrondissement: Poitiers
- Canton: Vouneuil-sous-Biard
- Commune: Boivre-la-Vallée
- Area^{1}: 24.71 km^{2} (9.54 sq mi)
- Elevation: 128 m (420 ft)
- Highest elevation: 159 m (522 ft)
- Lowest elevation: 117 m (384 ft)
- Population (2022): 783
  - Density: 31.7/km^{2} (82.1/sq mi)
- Time zone: UTC+01:00 (CET)
  - Summer (DST): UTC+02:00 (CEST)
- Postal code: 86470
- ^{1} French Land Register data, which excludes lakes, ponds, glaciers > 1 km^{2} (0.386 sq mi or 247 acres) and river estuaries.

Lavausseau (French pronunciation: [lavoso]) is a former commune in the Vienne department in the Nouvelle-Aquitaine region in western France. On 1 January 2019, it was merged into the new commune Boivre-la-Vallée.

The river Boivre runs through it.

== See also ==
- Communes of the Vienne department
