= Montreuil-Bonnin =

- Part of Boivre-la-Vallée
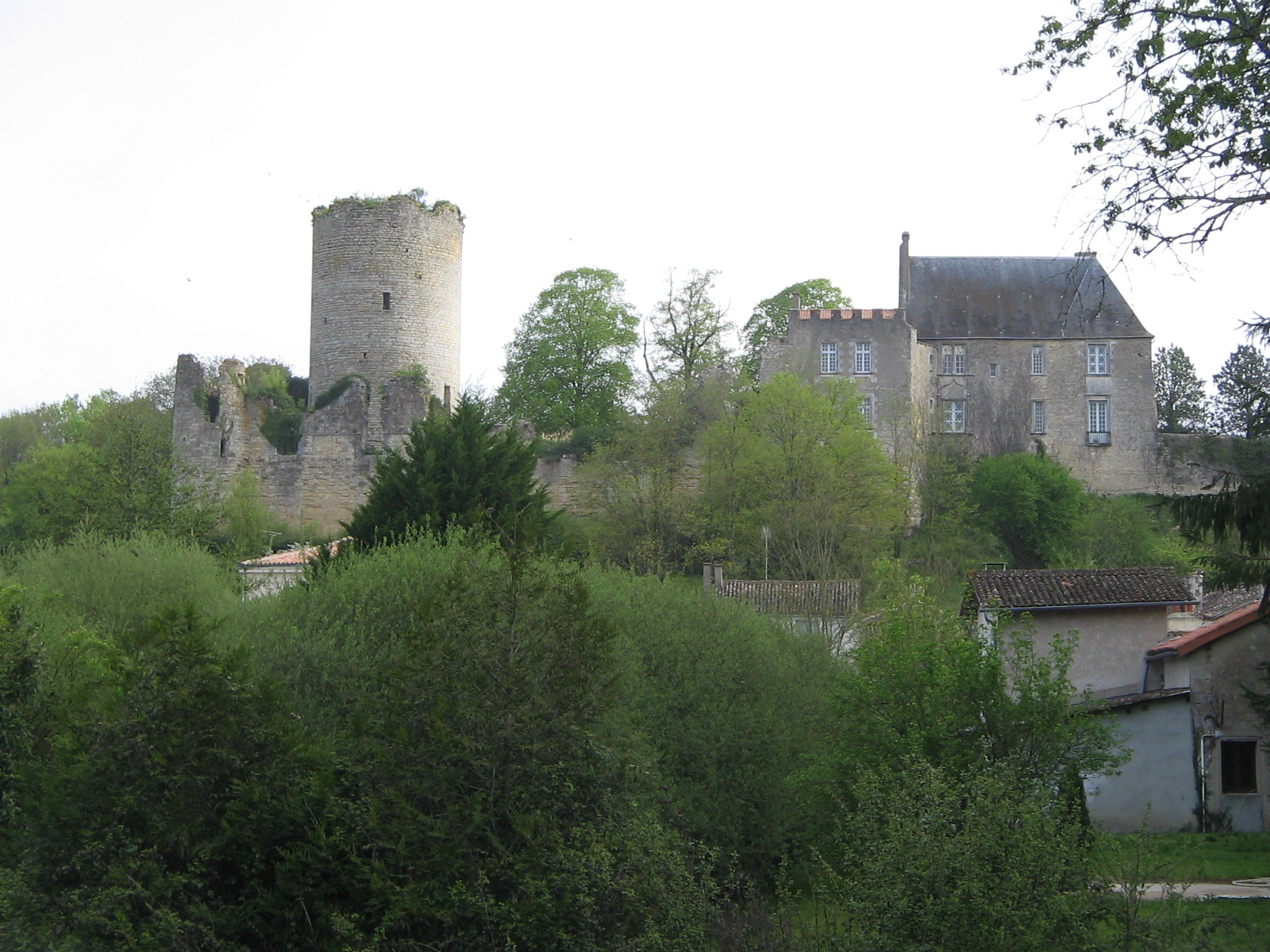
- The chateau in Montreuil-Bonnin
- Location of Montreuil-Bonnin
- Location within France Location within Nouvelle-Aquitaine
- Coordinates: 46°33′07″N 0°08′30″E
- Country: France
- Region: Nouvelle-Aquitaine
- Department: Vienne
- Arrondissement: Poitiers
- Canton: Vouneuil-sous-Biard
- Commune: Boivre-la-Vallée
- Area^{1}: 25.76 km^{2} (9.95 sq mi)
- Elevation: 115 m (377 ft)
- Highest elevation: 159 m (522 ft)
- Lowest elevation: 105 m (344 ft)
- Population (2022): 754
  - Density: 29.3/km^{2} (75.8/sq mi)
- Time zone: UTC+01:00 (CET)
  - Summer (DST): UTC+02:00 (CEST)
- Postal code: 86470
- ^{1} French Land Register data, which excludes lakes, ponds, glaciers > 1 km^{2} (0.386 sq mi or 247 acres) and river estuaries.

Montreuil-Bonnin (French pronunciation: [mɔ̃tʁœj bɔnɛ̃]) is a former commune in the Vienne department in the Nouvelle-Aquitaine region in western France. On 1 January 2019, it was merged into the new commune Boivre-la-Vallée.

== Geography ==
The river Boivre runs through it.

== See also ==
- Communes of the Vienne department
