= Ayron =

Ayron may refer to:

== People ==
- Ayron Jones (born 1986), American musician
- Ayron del Valle (born 1989), Colombian football player

== Places ==
- Ayron, Vienne, Nouvelle-Aquitaine, France
- River Ayron or River Aeron, Wales
