= Vouneuil =

Vouneuil may refer to two communes in the Vienne department in western France:

- Vouneuil-sous-Biard
- Vouneuil-sur-Vienne
