= Benassay =

- Part of Boivre-la-Vallée
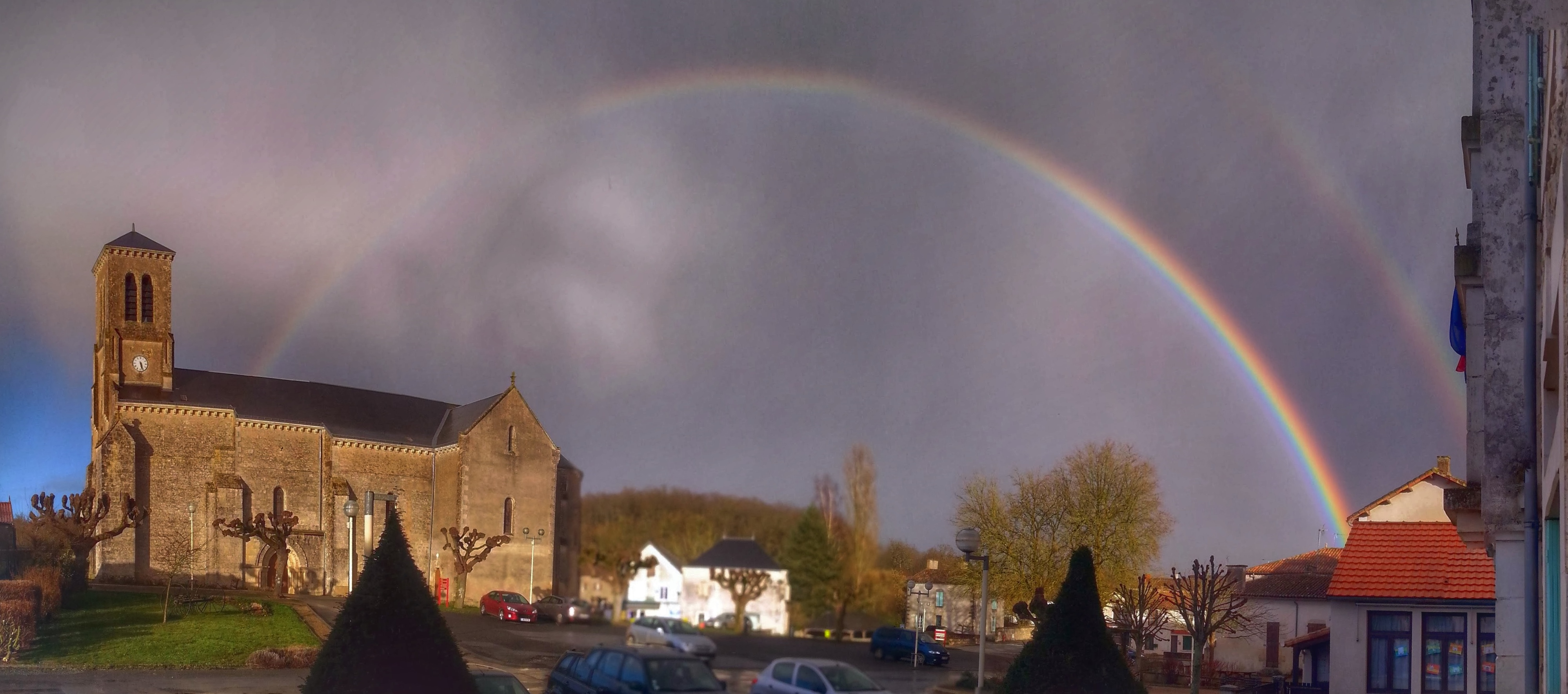
- A panoramic view of the church in Benassay
- Location of Benassay
- Location within France Location within Nouvelle-Aquitaine
- Coordinates: 46°33′35″N 0°02′51″E
- Country: France
- Region: Nouvelle-Aquitaine
- Department: Vienne
- Arrondissement: Poitiers
- Canton: Vouneuil-sous-Biard
- Commune: Boivre-la-Vallée
- Area^{1}: 42.41 km^{2} (16.37 sq mi)
- Elevation: 138 m (453 ft)
- Highest elevation: 187 m (614 ft)
- Lowest elevation: 130 m (430 ft)
- Population (2022): 797
  - Density: 18.8/km^{2} (48.7/sq mi)
- Time zone: UTC+01:00 (CET)
  - Summer (DST): UTC+02:00 (CEST)
- Postal code: 86470
- ^{1} French Land Register data, which excludes lakes, ponds, glaciers > 1 km^{2} (0.386 sq mi or 247 acres) and river estuaries.

Benassay (French pronunciation: [bənasɛ]) is a former commune in the Vienne department in the Nouvelle-Aquitaine region in western France. On 1 January 2019, it was merged into the new commune Boivre-la-Vallée.

The Boivre river runs through it.

== See also ==
- Communes of the Vienne department
