= Latillé =

- Commune
- Location of Latillé
- Location within France Location within Nouvelle-Aquitaine
- Coordinates: 46°37′10″N 0°04′34″E
- Country: France
- Region: Nouvelle-Aquitaine
- Department: Vienne
- Arrondissement: Poitiers
- Canton: Vouneuil-sous-Biard

Government
  - Mayor (2020–2026): Benoît Dupont
- Area^{1}: 25.17 km^{2} (9.72 sq mi)
- Elevation: 70 m (230 ft)
- Highest elevation: 163 m (535 ft)
- Lowest elevation: 117 m (384 ft)
- Population (2023): 1,494
  - Density: 59.36/km^{2} (153.7/sq mi)
- Time zone: UTC+01:00 (CET)
  - Summer (DST): UTC+02:00 (CEST)
- INSEE/Postal code: 86121 /86190
- ^{1} French Land Register data, which excludes lakes, ponds, glaciers > 1 km^{2} (0.386 sq mi or 247 acres) and river estuaries.

Latillé (French pronunciation: [latije]) is a commune in the Vienne department in the Nouvelle-Aquitaine region in western France.

== See also ==
- Communes of the Vienne department
