= Vouneuil-sous-Biard =

- Commune
- Coat of arms
- Location of Vouneuil-sous-Biard
- Location within France Location within Nouvelle-Aquitaine
- Coordinates: 46°34′27″N 0°16′20″E
- Country: France
- Region: Nouvelle-Aquitaine
- Department: Vienne
- Arrondissement: Poitiers
- Canton: Vouneuil-sous-Biard
- Intercommunality: CU Grand Poitiers

Government
  - Mayor (2020–2026): Jean-Charles Auzanneau
- Area^{1}: 25.98 km^{2} (10.03 sq mi)
- Elevation: 128 m (420 ft)
- Highest elevation: 149 m (489 ft)
- Lowest elevation: 77 m (253 ft)
- Population (2023): 6,290
  - Density: 242/km^{2} (627/sq mi)
- Time zone: UTC+01:00 (CET)
  - Summer (DST): UTC+02:00 (CEST)
- INSEE/Postal code: 86297 /86580
- ^{1} French Land Register data, which excludes lakes, ponds, glaciers > 1 km^{2} (0.386 sq mi or 247 acres) and river estuaries.

Vouneuil-sous-Biard (French pronunciation: [vunœj su bjaʁ], literally Vouneuil under Biard) is a commune in the Vienne department in the Nouvelle-Aquitaine region in western France.

The Boivre river runs through it.

== Population ==
Historical population
Year	Pop.	±% p.a.
1968	1,065	—
1975	1,949	+9.02%
1982	2,859	+5.63%
1990	3,790	+3.59%
1999	4,126	+0.95%
2007	4,758	+1.80%
2012	5,304	+2.20%
2017	5,896	+2.14%
2023	6,290	+1.08%
Source: INSEE

== See also ==
- Communes of the Vienne department
