= Maille =

Maille may refer to:

- Maille (company), seasoning company
- Maillé (disambiguation), any of several French villages
- Maille, an archaic spelling of mail (armour)
