= Boivre-la-Vallée =

- Commune
- Location of Boivre-la-Vallée
- Location within France Location within Nouvelle-Aquitaine
- Coordinates: 46°33′37″N 0°04′27″E
- Country: France
- Region: Nouvelle-Aquitaine
- Department: Vienne
- Arrondissement: Poitiers
- Canton: Vouneuil-sous-Biard
- Intercommunality: Haut-Poitou

Government
  - Mayor (2020–2026): Dany Dubernard
- Area^{1}: 117.41 km^{2} (45.33 sq mi)
- Highest elevation: 187 m (614 ft)
- Lowest elevation: 105 m (344 ft)
- Population (2023): 3,024
  - Density: 25.76/km^{2} (66.71/sq mi)
- Time zone: UTC+01:00 (CET)
  - Summer (DST): UTC+02:00 (CEST)
- INSEE/Postal code: 86123 /86470
- ^{1} French Land Register data, which excludes lakes, ponds, glaciers > 1 km^{2} (0.386 sq mi or 247 acres) and river estuaries.

Boivre-la-Vallée (French pronunciation: [bwavʁ la vale]) is a commune in the Vienne department in the Nouvelle-Aquitaine region in western France. It was established on 1 January 2019 by merger of the former communes of Lavausseau (the seat), Benassay, La Chapelle-Montreuil and Montreuil-Bonnin.

== Population ==
Population data refer to the area corresponding with the commune as of January 2025.

Historical population
Year	Pop.	±% p.a.
1968	2,424	—
1975	2,215	−1.28%
1982	2,397	+1.13%
1990	2,563	+0.84%
1999	2,706	+0.61%
2007	2,881	+0.79%
2012	3,065	+1.25%
2017	3,083	+0.12%
2023	3,024	−0.32%
Source: INSEE

== See also ==
- Communes of the Vienne department
