= La Ferrière-en-Parthenay =

- Commune
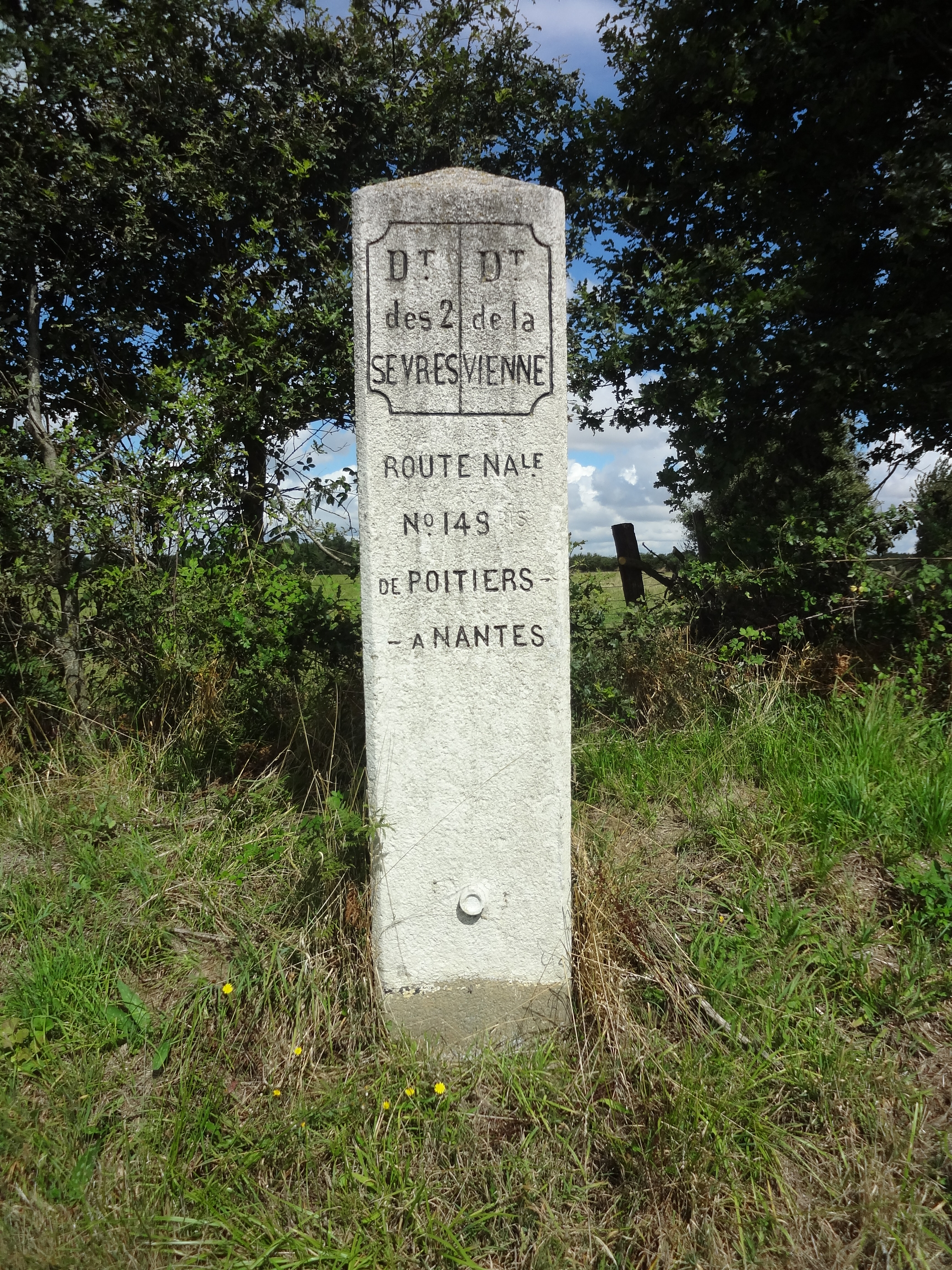
- A road sign on Route nationale 149
- Location of La Ferrière-en-Parthenay
- Location within France Location within Nouvelle-Aquitaine
- Coordinates: 46°39′29″N 0°04′29″W
- Country: France
- Region: Nouvelle-Aquitaine
- Department: Deux-Sèvres
- Arrondissement: Parthenay
- Canton: La Gâtine
- Intercommunality: CC Parthenay-Gâtine

Government
  - Mayor (2020–2026): Guillaume Clement
- Area^{1}: 29.12 km^{2} (11.24 sq mi)
- Elevation: 167 m (548 ft)
- Highest elevation: 185 m (607 ft)
- Lowest elevation: 142 m (466 ft)
- Population (2023): 774
  - Density: 26.6/km^{2} (68.8/sq mi)
- Time zone: UTC+01:00 (CET)
  - Summer (DST): UTC+02:00 (CEST)
- INSEE/Postal code: 79120 /79390
- ^{1} French Land Register data, which excludes lakes, ponds, glaciers > 1 km^{2} (0.386 sq mi or 247 acres) and river estuaries.

La Ferrière-en-Parthenay is a commune in the Deux-Sèvres department in the Nouvelle-Aquitaine region in western France.

== See also ==
- Communes of the Deux-Sèvres department
