= Biard =

- Commune
- Location of Biard
- Location within France Location within Nouvelle-Aquitaine
- Coordinates: 46°34′42″N 0°18′22″E
- Country: France
- Region: Nouvelle-Aquitaine
- Department: Vienne
- Arrondissement: Poitiers
- Canton: Poitiers-1
- Intercommunality: CU Grand Poitiers

Government
  - Mayor (2020–2026): Gilles Morisseau
- Area^{1}: 7.47 km^{2} (2.88 sq mi)
- Elevation: 100 m (330 ft)
- Highest elevation: 136 m (446 ft)
- Lowest elevation: 75 m (246 ft)
- Population (2023): 1,910
  - Density: 256/km^{2} (662/sq mi)
- Time zone: UTC+01:00 (CET)
  - Summer (DST): UTC+02:00 (CEST)
- INSEE/Postal code: 86027 /86580
- ^{1} French Land Register data, which excludes lakes, ponds, glaciers > 1 km^{2} (0.386 sq mi or 247 acres) and river estuaries.

Biard (French pronunciation: [bjaʁ]) is a commune in the Vienne department in the Nouvelle-Aquitaine region in western France, in the Boivre valley.

A suburb of Poitiers, Biard gives its name to the Poitiers–Biard Airport, located 2 km west of the city.

Local facilities include a primary school, municipal stadium and the Stade Marcel Guérin, operated by the SNCF for railway workers.

== Population ==
Historical population

Year	Pop.	±% p.a.
1793	196	—
1800	139	−4.79%
1806	167	+3.11%
1851	615	+2.94%
1856	670	+1.73%
1861	701	+0.91%
1866	689	−0.34%
1872	629	−1.51%
1876	648	+0.75%
1881	699	+1.53%
1886	762	+1.74%
1891	1,053	+6.68%
1896	742	−6.76%
1901	805	+1.64%
1906	806	+0.02%
1911	836	+0.73%

Year	Pop.	±% p.a.
1921	848	+0.14%
1926	940	+2.08%
1931	1,003	+1.31%
1936	997	−0.12%
1946	1,224	+2.07%
1954	1,287	+0.63%
1962	1,033	−2.71%
1968	1,121	+1.37%
1975	1,173	+0.65%
1982	1,244	+0.84%
1990	1,264	+0.20%
1999	1,501	+1.93%
2007	1,585	+0.68%
2012	1,706	+1.48%
2017	1,751	+0.52%
2023	1,910	+1.46%

Source: EHESS and INSEE

== See also ==
- Communes of the Vienne department
