= Vasles =

- Commune
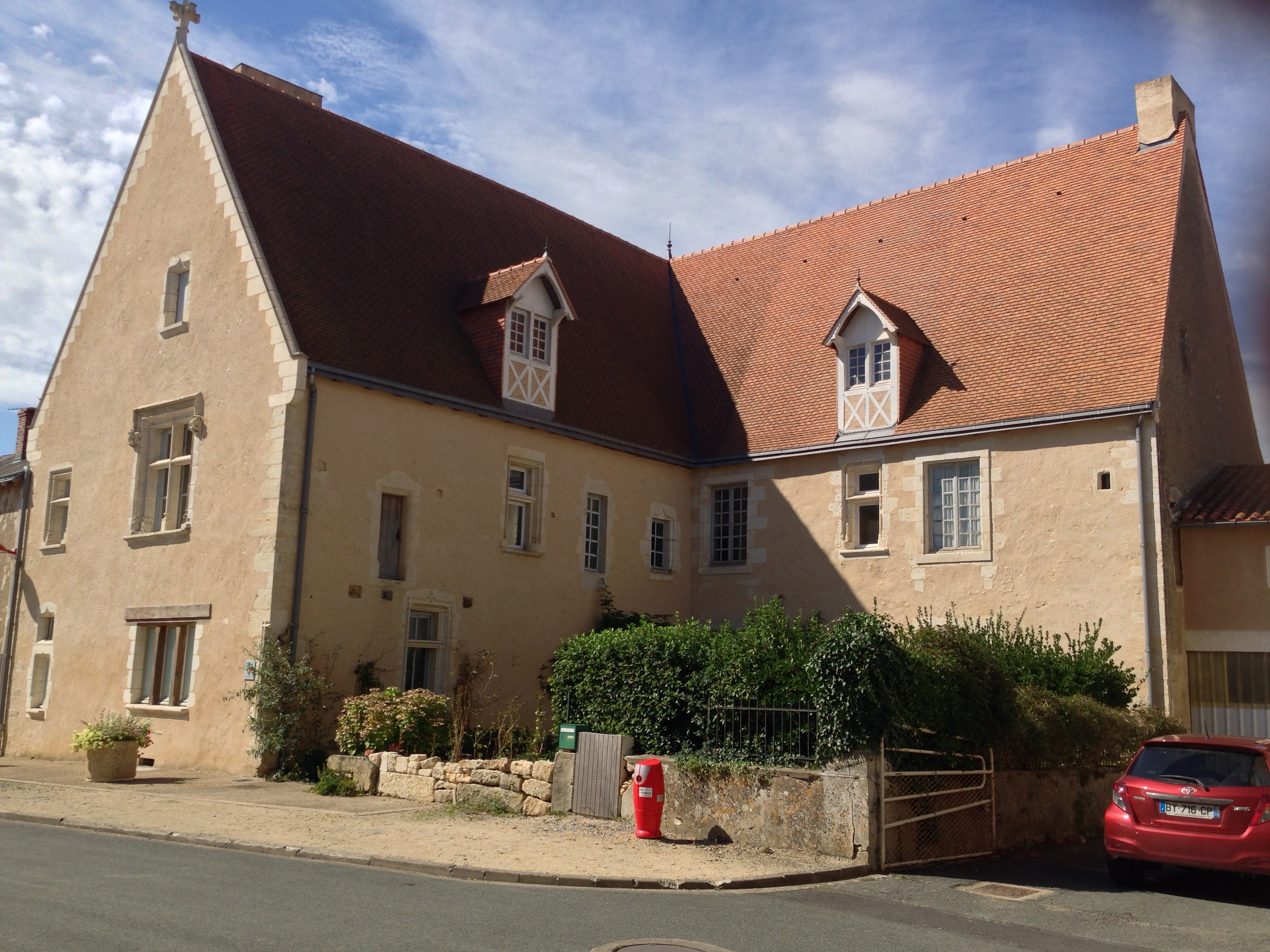
- The Chateau of Vasles
- Location of Vasles
- Location within France Location within Nouvelle-Aquitaine
- Coordinates: 46°34′34″N 0°01′27″W
- Country: France
- Region: Nouvelle-Aquitaine
- Department: Deux-Sèvres
- Arrondissement: Parthenay
- Canton: La Gâtine
- Intercommunality: CC Parthenay-Gâtine

Government
  - Mayor (2022–2026): Sylvain Rouvreau
- Area^{1}: 89.16 km^{2} (34.42 sq mi)
- Elevation: 230 m (750 ft)
- Highest elevation: 227 m (745 ft)
- Lowest elevation: 130 m (430 ft)
- Population (2023): 1,665
  - Density: 18.67/km^{2} (48.37/sq mi)
- Time zone: UTC+01:00 (CET)
  - Summer (DST): UTC+02:00 (CEST)
- INSEE/Postal code: 79339 /79340
- ^{1} French Land Register data, which excludes lakes, ponds, glaciers > 1 km^{2} (0.386 sq mi or 247 acres) and river estuaries.

Vasles (French pronunciation: [val]) is a commune in the Deux-Sèvres department in western France.

== See also ==
- Communes of the Deux-Sèvres department
