= Chiré-en-Montreuil =

- Commune
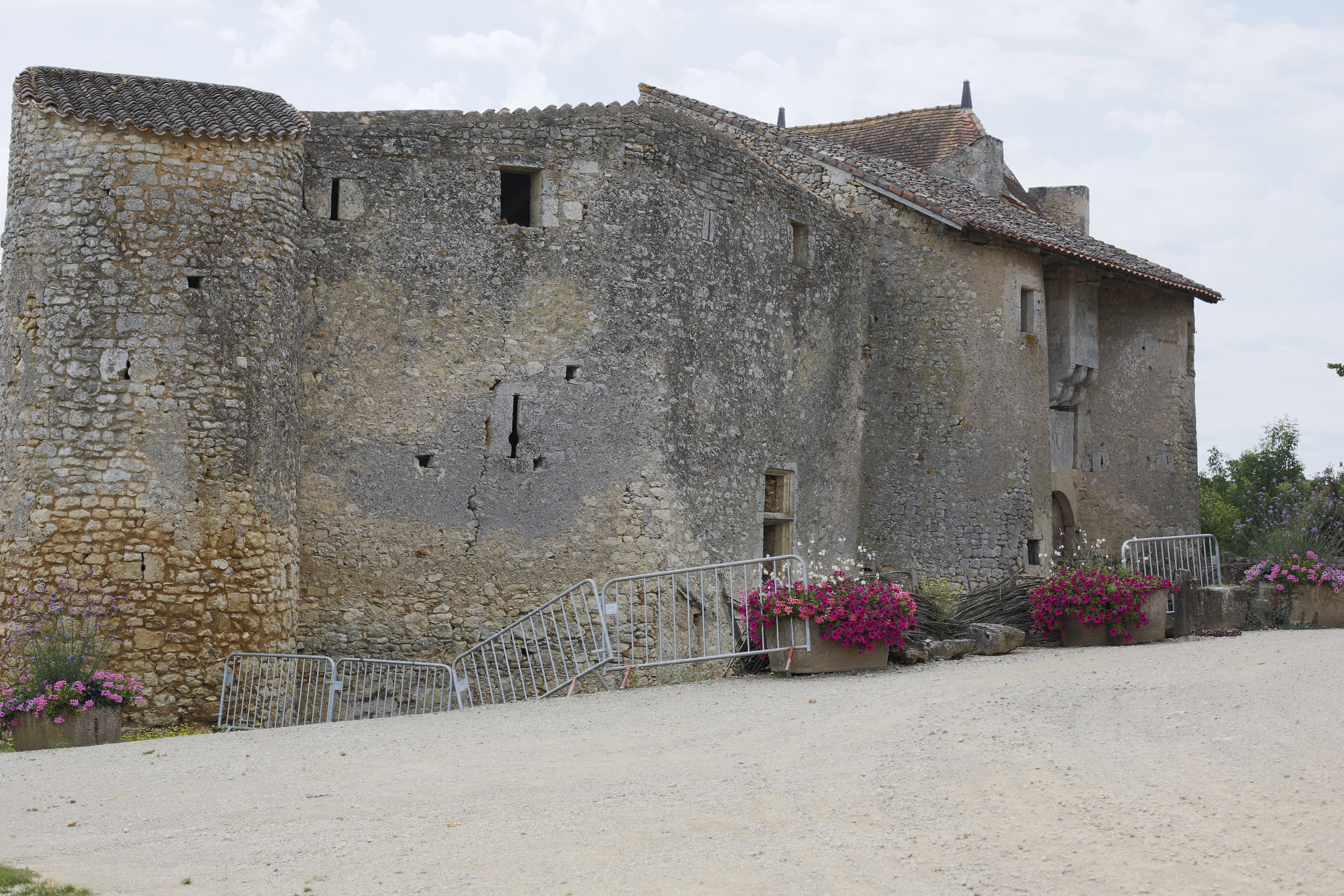
- The castle
- Location of Chiré-en-Montreuil
- Location within France Location within Nouvelle-Aquitaine
- Coordinates: 46°38′23″N 0°07′38″E
- Country: France
- Region: Nouvelle-Aquitaine
- Department: Vienne
- Arrondissement: Poitiers
- Canton: Vouneuil-sous-Biard

Government
  - Mayor (2020–2026): Ibrahim Bichara
- Area^{1}: 21.41 km^{2} (8.27 sq mi)
- Elevation: 136 m (446 ft)
- Highest elevation: 159 m (522 ft)
- Lowest elevation: 107 m (351 ft)
- Population (2023): 922
  - Density: 43.1/km^{2} (112/sq mi)
- Time zone: UTC+01:00 (CET)
  - Summer (DST): UTC+02:00 (CEST)
- INSEE/Postal code: 86074 /86190
- ^{1} French Land Register data, which excludes lakes, ponds, glaciers > 1 km^{2} (0.386 sq mi or 247 acres) and river estuaries.

Chiré-en-Montreuil (French pronunciation: [ʃiʁe ɑ̃ mɔ̃tʁœj]) is a commune in the Vienne department in the Nouvelle-Aquitaine region in western France.

== See also ==
- Communes of the Vienne department
