= Maillé, Vienne =

Maillé
- Commune
- Location of Maillé
- Location within France Location within Nouvelle-Aquitaine
- Coordinates: 46°40′47″N 0°05′36″E
- Country: France
- Region: Nouvelle-Aquitaine
- Department: Vienne
- Arrondissement: Poitiers
- Canton: Vouneuil-sous-Biard

Government
  - Mayor (2020–2026): Hubert Lacoste
- Area^{1}: 12.32 km^{2} (4.76 sq mi)
- Elevation: 140 m (460 ft)
- Highest elevation: 153 m (502 ft)
- Lowest elevation: 124 m (407 ft)
- Population (2023): 637
  - Density: 51.7/km^{2} (134/sq mi)
- Time zone: UTC+01:00 (CET)
  - Summer (DST): UTC+02:00 (CEST)
- INSEE/Postal code: 86142 /86190
- ^{1} French Land Register data, which excludes lakes, ponds, glaciers > 1 km^{2} (0.386 sq mi or 247 acres) and river estuaries.

Maillé (French pronunciation: [maje]) is a commune in the Vienne department in the Nouvelle-Aquitaine region in western France.

== See also ==
- Communes of the Vienne department
