= Béruges =

- Commune
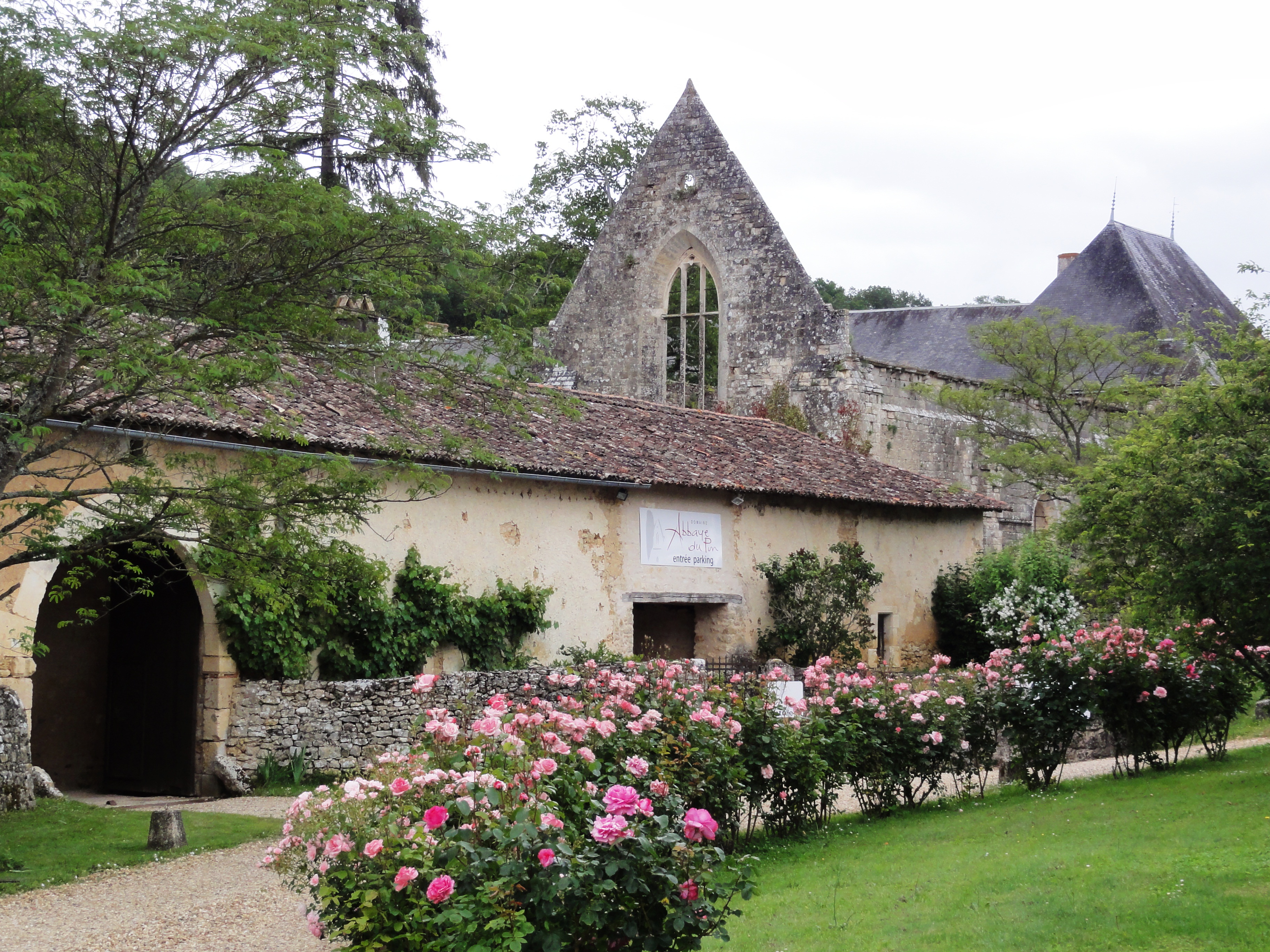
- The Abbaye du Pin, in Béruges
- Location of Béruges
- Location within France Location within Nouvelle-Aquitaine
- Coordinates: 46°34′06″N 0°12′29″E
- Country: France
- Region: Nouvelle-Aquitaine
- Department: Vienne
- Arrondissement: Poitiers
- Canton: Vouneuil-sous-Biard
- Intercommunality: CU Grand Poitiers

Government
  - Mayor (2020–2026): Olivier Kirch
- Area^{1}: 32.63 km^{2} (12.60 sq mi)
- Highest elevation: 152 m (499 ft)
- Lowest elevation: 87 m (285 ft)
- Population (2023): 1,528
  - Density: 46.83/km^{2} (121.3/sq mi)
- Time zone: UTC+01:00 (CET)
  - Summer (DST): UTC+02:00 (CEST)
- INSEE/Postal code: 86024 /86190
- ^{1} French Land Register data, which excludes lakes, ponds, glaciers > 1 km^{2} (0.386 sq mi or 247 acres) and river estuaries.

Béruges (French pronunciation: [beʁyʒ]) is a commune in the Vienne department in the Nouvelle-Aquitaine region in western France.

The Boivre river runs through it.

== See also ==
- Communes of the Vienne department
