= Eric Mensforth =

Sir Eric Mensforth, CBE, DL, FREng, FIMechE, FRAeS; Hon. FIEE (17 May 1906 – 20 February 2000) was a British engineer. He was one of the pioneers of the British helicopter industry.

He was educated at Altrincham County High School, University College School and King's College, Cambridge.
