= Chalandray =

- Commune
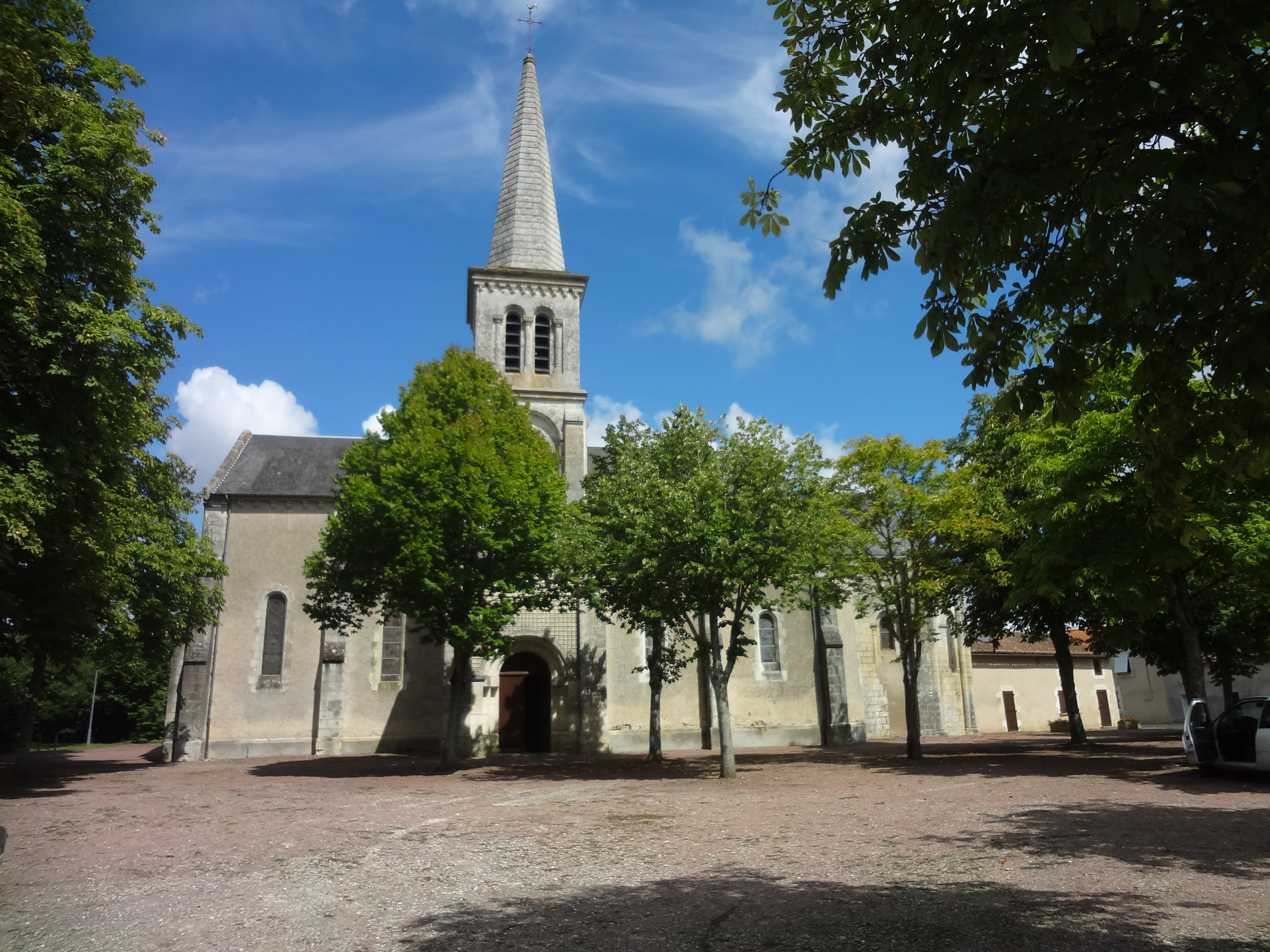
- The church of Our Lady, in Chalandray
- Location of Chalandray
- Location within France Location within Nouvelle-Aquitaine
- Coordinates: 46°39′42″N 0°00′02″W
- Country: France
- Region: Nouvelle-Aquitaine
- Department: Vienne
- Arrondissement: Poitiers
- Canton: Vouneuil-sous-Biard

Government
  - Mayor (2020–2026): Nathalie Peltier
- Area^{1}: 24.97 km^{2} (9.64 sq mi)
- Elevation: 158 m (518 ft)
- Highest elevation: 171 m (561 ft)
- Lowest elevation: 131 m (430 ft)
- Population (2023): 784
  - Density: 31.4/km^{2} (81.3/sq mi)
- Time zone: UTC+01:00 (CET)
  - Summer (DST): UTC+02:00 (CEST)
- INSEE/Postal code: 86050 /86190
- ^{1} French Land Register data, which excludes lakes, ponds, glaciers > 1 km^{2} (0.386 sq mi or 247 acres) and river estuaries.

Chalandray (French pronunciation: [ʃalɑ̃dʁɛ]) is a commune in the Vienne department in the Nouvelle-Aquitaine region in western France.

The Prime Meridian passes through Chalandray. This is shown by a sign marking the 'Méridien de Greenwich'.

== See also ==
- Communes of the Vienne department
