= Vouillé, Vienne =

Vouillé
- Commune
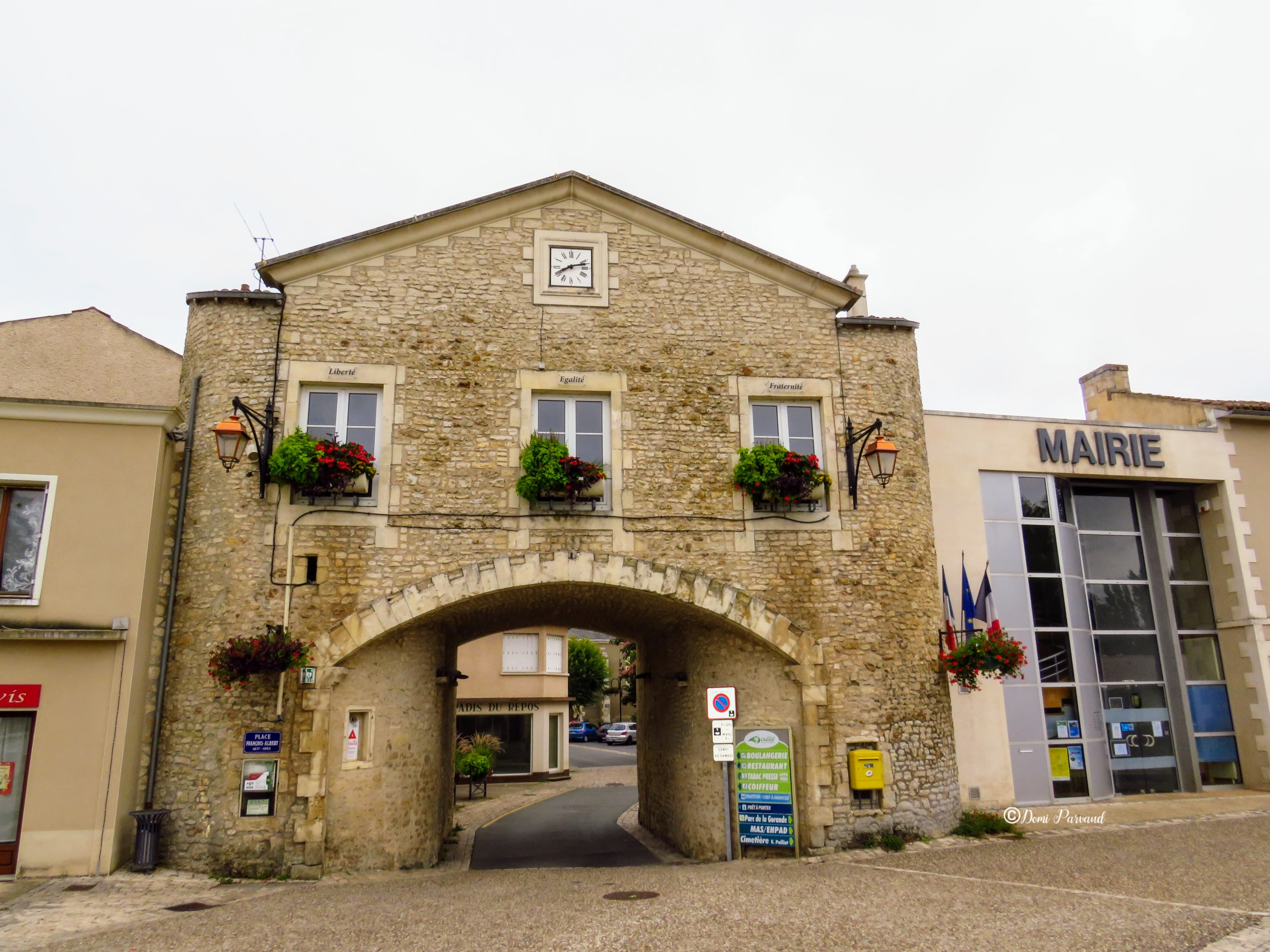
- Town hall

- Coat of arms
- Location of Vouillé
- Location within France Location within Nouvelle-Aquitaine
- Coordinates: 46°38′29″N 0°10′11″E
- Country: France
- Region: Nouvelle-Aquitaine
- Department: Vienne
- Arrondissement: Poitiers
- Canton: Vouneuil-sous-Biard
- Intercommunality: Haut-Poitou

Government
  - Mayor (2020–2026): Éric Martin
- Area^{1}: 33.95 km^{2} (13.11 sq mi)
- Elevation: 80 m (260 ft)
- Highest elevation: 155 m (509 ft)
- Lowest elevation: 97 m (318 ft)
- Population (2023): 3,697
  - Density: 108.9/km^{2} (282.0/sq mi)
- Time zone: UTC+01:00 (CET)
  - Summer (DST): UTC+02:00 (CEST)
- INSEE/Postal code: 86294 /86190
- ^{1} French Land Register data, which excludes lakes, ponds, glaciers > 1 km^{2} (0.386 sq mi or 247 acres) and river estuaries.

Vouillé (French pronunciation: [vuje]) is a commune in the Vienne department in the Nouvelle-Aquitaine region in western France. Inhabitants are known in French as Vouglaisiens.

The commune is listed as a Village étape.

== History ==
The Battle of Vouillé or Vouglé (from Latin Campus Vogladensis) was fought in the northern marches of Visigothic territory, at Vouillé, Vienne, (Gaul), in the spring of 507 between the Franks commanded by Clovis and the Visigoths of Alaric II, the conqueror of Spain.

== Population ==
Historical population
Year	Pop.	±% p.a.
1968	1,456	—
1975	1,788	+2.98%
1982	2,380	+4.17%
1990	2,574	+0.98%
1999	2,774	+0.83%
2007	3,322	+2.28%
2012	3,678	+2.06%
2017	3,701	+0.12%
2023	3,697	−0.02%
Source: INSEE

== See also ==
- Communes of the Vienne department
