= Ayron, Vienne =

Ayron
- Commune
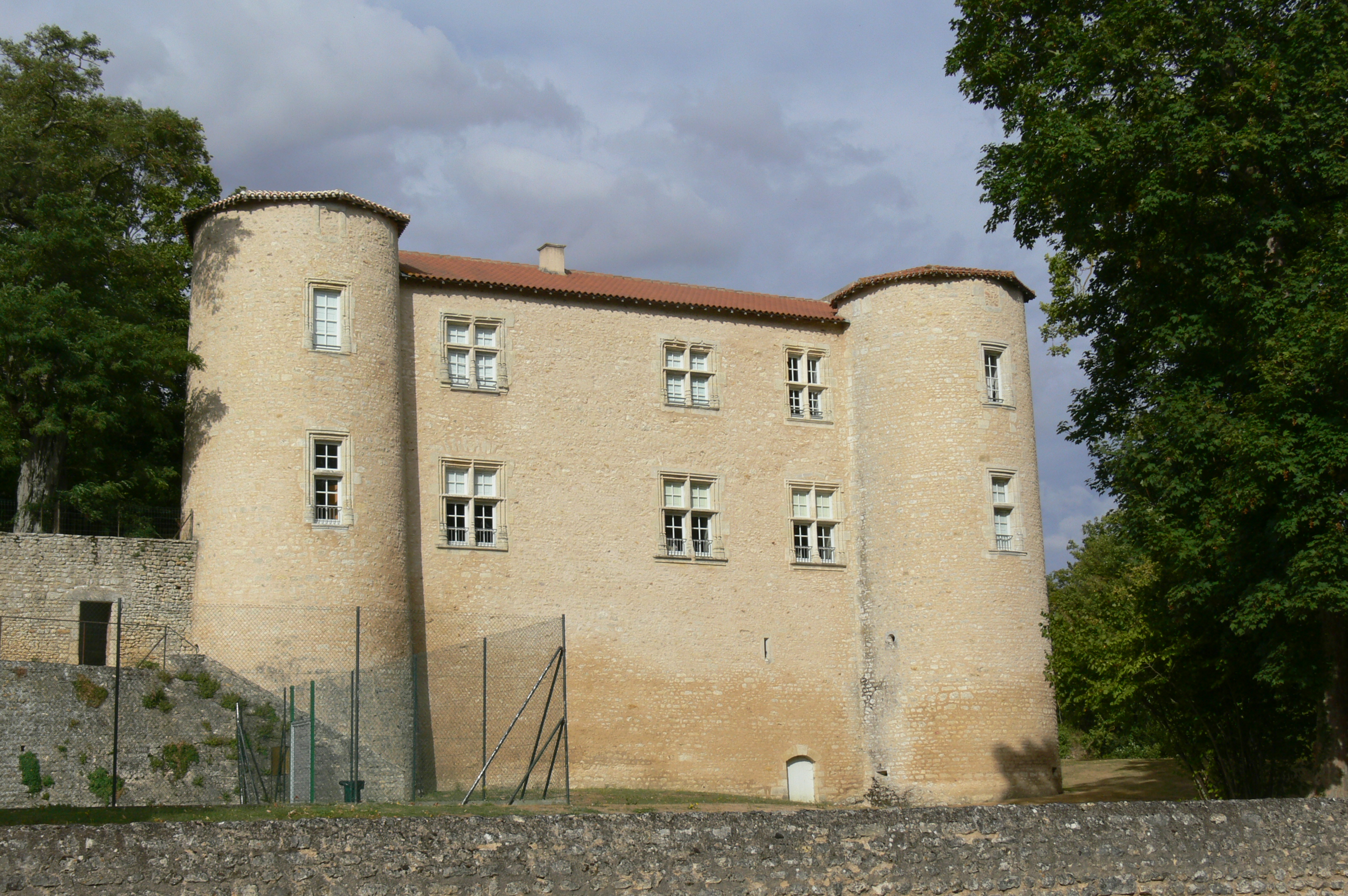
- The Château of Ayron
- Location of Ayron
- Location within France Location within Nouvelle-Aquitaine
- Coordinates: 46°39′41″N 0°04′41″E
- Country: France
- Region: Nouvelle-Aquitaine
- Department: Vienne
- Arrondissement: Poitiers
- Canton: Vouneuil-sous-Biard
- Intercommunality: CC Haut-Poitou

Government
  - Mayor (2020–2026): Fabienne Guérin
- Area^{1}: 28.30 km^{2} (10.93 sq mi)
- Elevation: 139 m (456 ft)
- Highest elevation: 169 m (554 ft)
- Lowest elevation: 117 m (384 ft)
- Population (2023): 1,085
  - Density: 38.34/km^{2} (99.30/sq mi)
- Time zone: UTC+01:00 (CET)
  - Summer (DST): UTC+02:00 (CEST)
- INSEE/Postal code: 86017 /86190
- ^{1} French Land Register data, which excludes lakes, ponds, glaciers > 1 km^{2} (0.386 sq mi or 247 acres) and river estuaries.

Ayron (French pronunciation: [ɛʁɔ̃]) is a commune in the Vienne department in the Nouvelle-Aquitaine region in western France.

== See also ==
- Communes of the Vienne department
