= Canton of Vouneuil-sous-Biard =

Coordinates: 46.57°N 0.27°E

The canton of Vouneuil-sous-Biard is an administrative division of the Vienne department, western France. It was created at the French canton reorganisation which came into effect in March 2015. Its seat is in Vouneuil-sous-Biard.

It consists of the following communes:

1. Ayron
2. Béruges
3. Boivre-la-Vallée
4. Chalandray
5. Chiré-en-Montreuil
6. Frozes
7. Latillé
8. Maillé
9. Quinçay
10. Vouillé
11. Vouneuil-sous-Biard
