= Spanish Romanesque =

Type of art

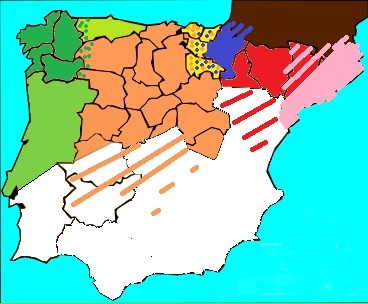
Map depicting the spread of Romanesque. In pink, the areas of the Catalan Romanesque. In red, the areas of the Aragonese Romanesque. In blue, the areas of the Navarrese Romanesque. In orange, the areas of Castilian and Leonese Romanesque. Between these two, in yellow, the current autonomous communities of La Rioja and Basque Country, which at the time were disputed by both kingdoms (eventually incorporated into Castile). In various shades of green, Asturian Romanesque, Galician Romanesque and Portuguese Romanesque.

The Camino de Santiago enters in the Hispanic Christian kingdoms of the Iberian Peninsula for its Aragonese branches (Canfranc) and Navarre (Roncesvalles). From Logroño goes through the kingdoms of Castile and León, ending in Santiago de Compostela. The Cantabrian branch is diverted to pass through Oviedo, route coined one of the first tourist slogans. "Who go to Santiago and not see The Savior, visits the servant and forgets the lord".

Spanish Romanesque designates the Romanesque art developed in the Christian kingdoms of the Iberian Peninsula in the 11th and 12th centuries. Its stylistic features are essentially common to the European Romanesque although it developed particular characteristics in the different regions of the peninsula. There is no Romanesque art in the southern half of the peninsula because it remained under Muslim rule (al-Andalus). The examples of Romanesque buildings in the central area of the peninsula are sparse and of the latest period, with virtually no presence south of the Ebro and the Tagus. Most Romanesque buildings can be found in the northern third of the peninsula. Romanesque art was introduced into the peninsula from east to west, so scholars have usually defined regional characteristics accordingly: the "eastern kingdoms" comprising the Pyrenean areas, Catalan Romanesque, Aragonese Romanesque and Navarrese Romanesque, and the "western kingdoms" comprising Castilian-Leonese Romanesque, Asturian Romanesque, Galician Romanesque and Portuguese Romanesque.

The First Romanesque or Lombard Romanesque is specially present in Catalonia, while the full Romanesque spread from the foundations of the Order of Cluny along the axis of the Camino de Santiago. The late-romanesque of the 13th century, can be found specially in rural buildings.

== Architecture ==
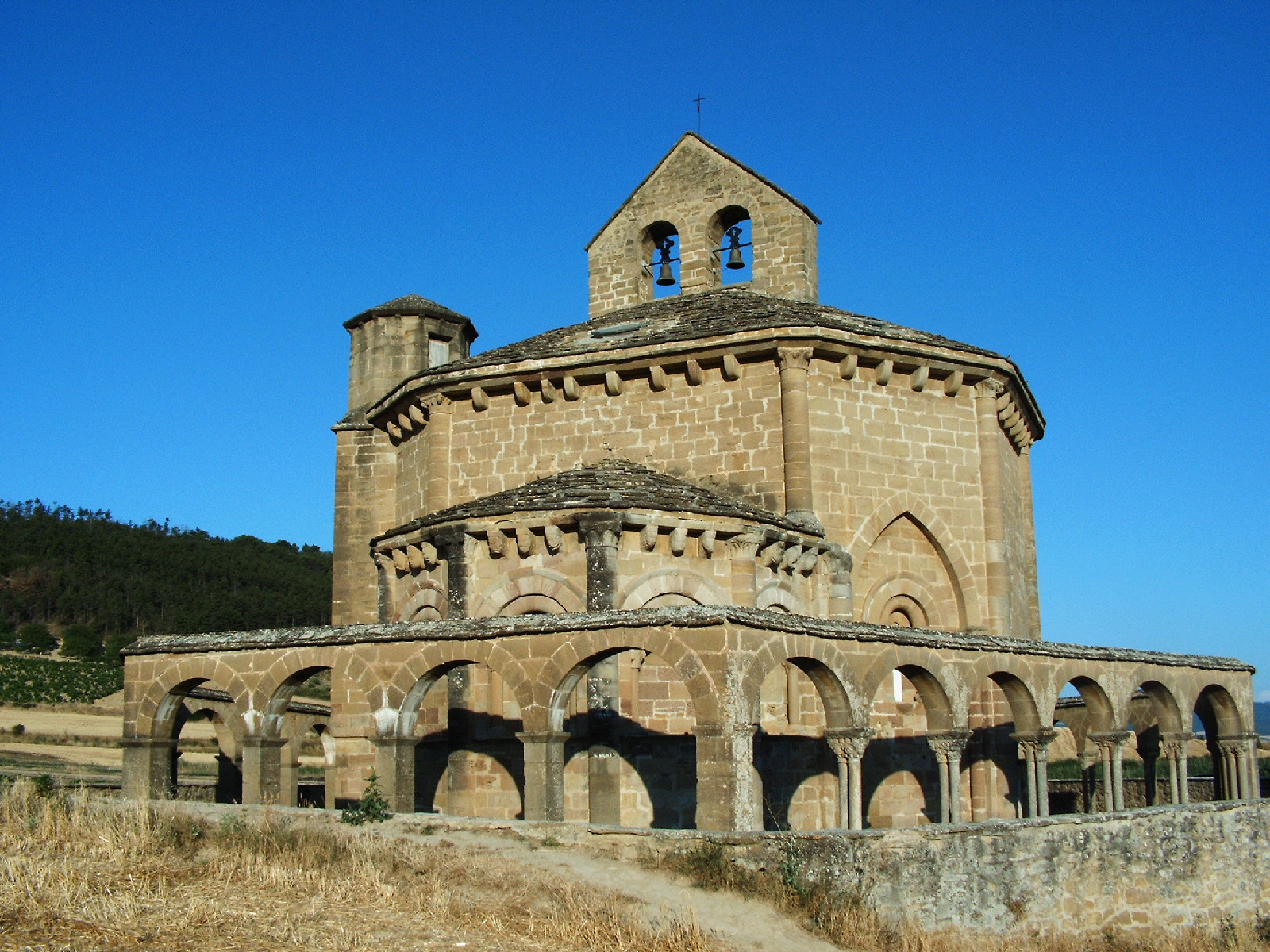
Santa María de Eunate.

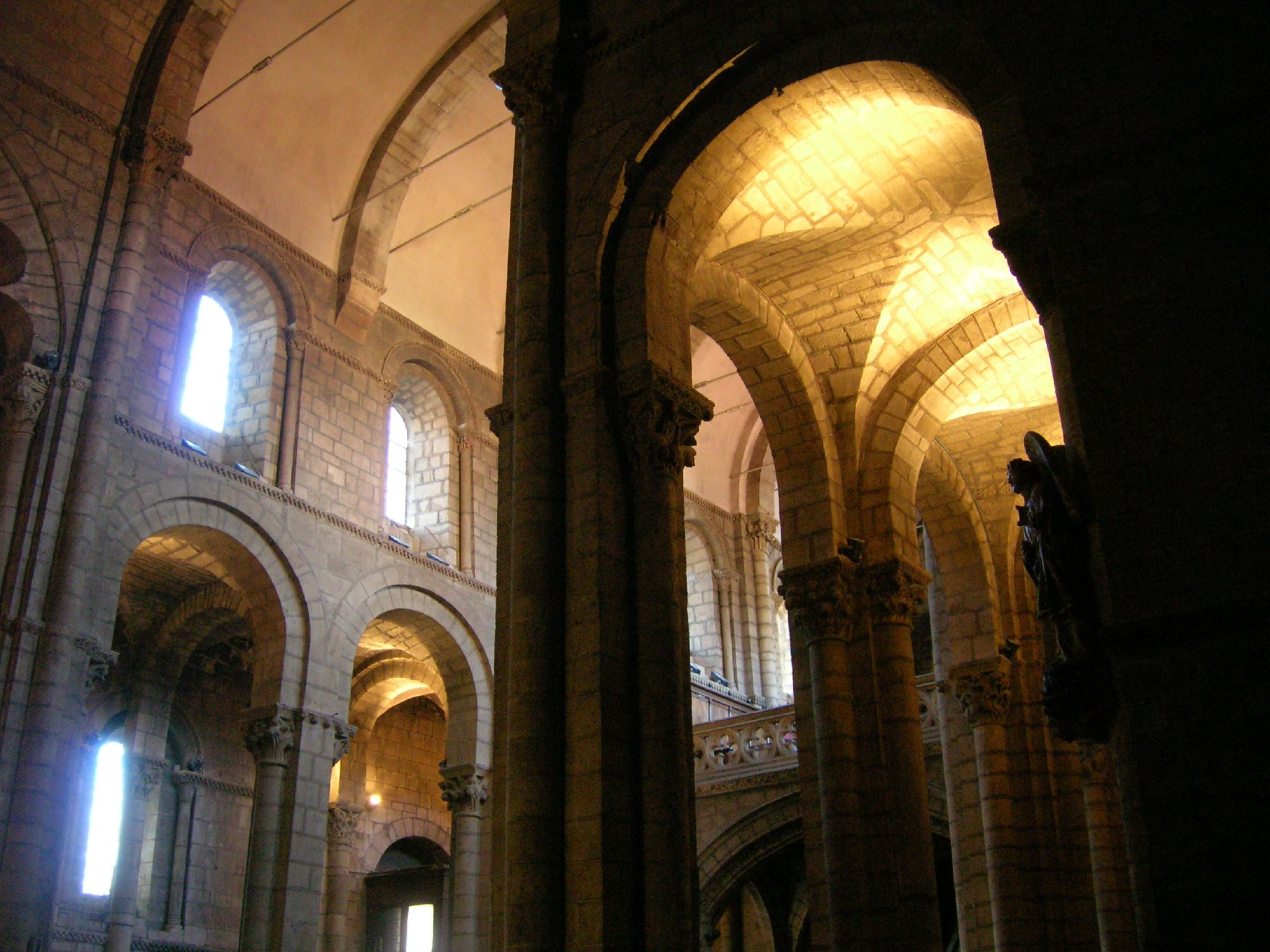
Lateral nave (with edge vaults) and central nave (barrel vault) of the church of San Isidoro de León (left, startup of lobed arch of transept).

From the 11th century the European artistic influence, specially from the Burgundian Cluniac monasteries and the Lombard monasteries, was superimposed on local artistic traditions such as "Pre-Romanesque, Visigothic art, Asturian art, Mozarabic art and Repoblación art) as well as Andalusi art, also called Hispanic Muslim, and cohabited with the so-called Mudéjar Romanesque (or "Romanesque of brick") dominant in some areas such as the centre of the northern plateau – from Sahagún to Cuéllar – Toledo or Teruel, giving rise to an art of strong personality.

The chronology in the penetration of architectural forms can be followed from east to west. The first examples are in Catalonia (Sant Pere de Rodes, 1022) and those developed along the Camino de Santiago in Aragon (Cathedral of Jaca, from 1054), Navarre (Leire, 1057), Castile (San Martin de Frómista, 1066) and Leon (San Isidoro – portal of 1067), ending in Galicia, where the most outstanding work was raised: the cathedral of Santiago de Compostela (begun in 1075 with the pilgrimage plan characteristic of most of the churches of the Way (for example St. Sernin of Toulouse).

The 12th century saw the culmination of the style with:

- The Monastery of Ripoll and the churches of Boí and Taüll in Catalonia,
- Castle of Loarre and Monastery of San Juan de la Peña in Aragon
- Palace of the Kings of Navarre (Estella), the church of San Miguel (Estella), Saint Mary of Eunate and Saint Peter of Olite in Navarre
- the Segovian arcaded churches, the church of Santo Domingo (Soria) and the Monastery of San Juan de Duero in Castile,
- the Cathedral of Zamora and the Old Cathedral of Salamanca in Leon.

The transition from Romanesque to Gothic starts from the late 12th century and can be seen in the Cathedral of Tarragona and La Seu Vella (Lleida).

Few but notable are the churches of central plan, which are often associated with models from the Holy Land brought by the military orders. The main examples are the church of Saint Mary of Eunate in Navarre, the church of the Holy Sepulchre (Torres del Río) and the church of the Vera Cruz (Segovia).

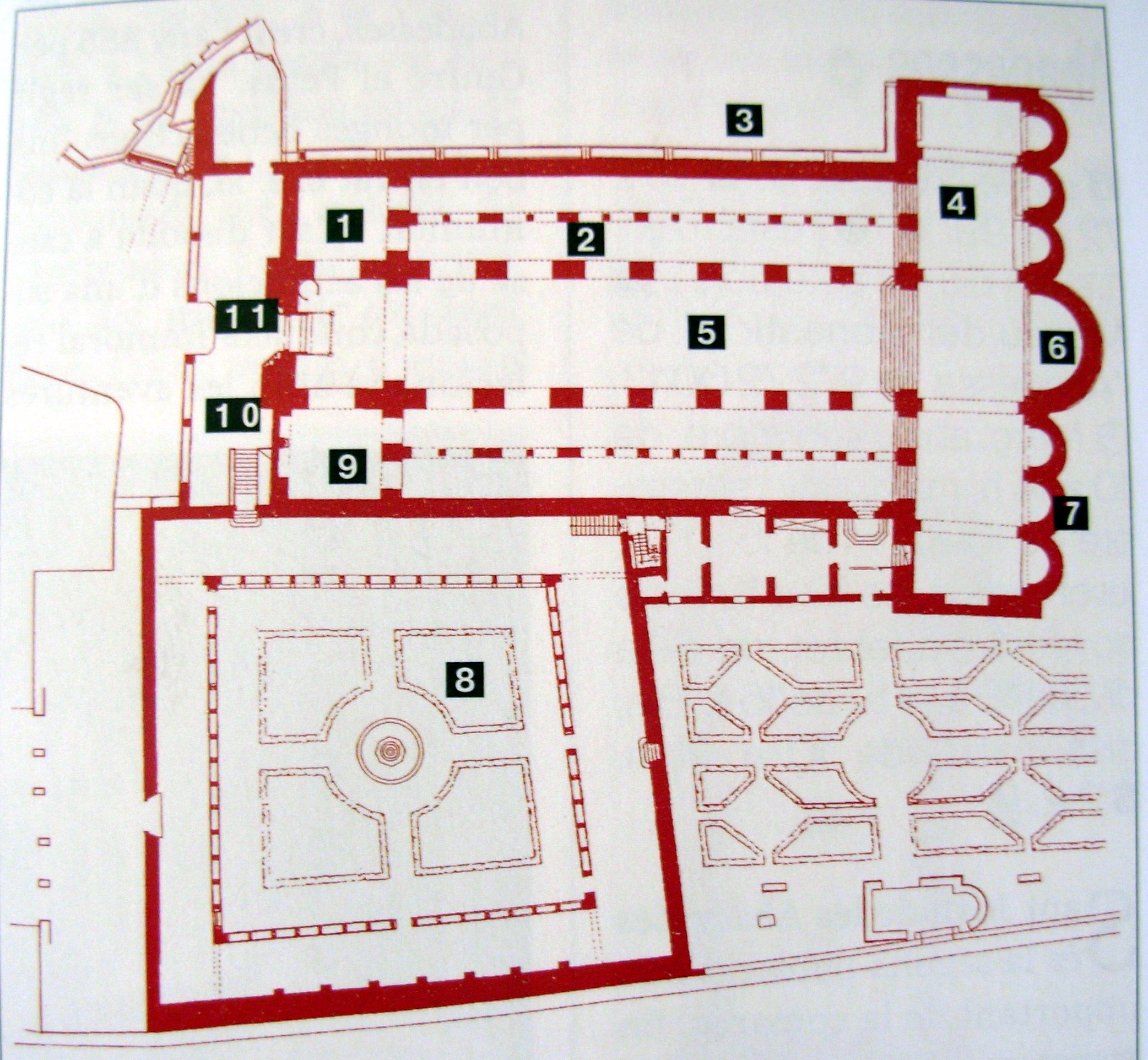
Santa Maria de Ripoll.

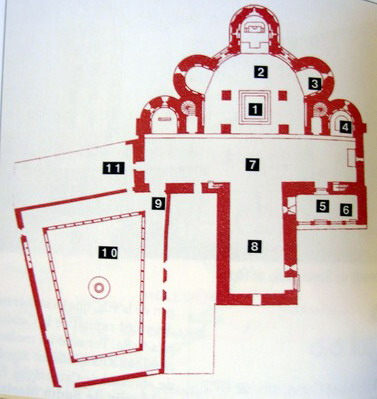
Sant Joan de les Abadesses.

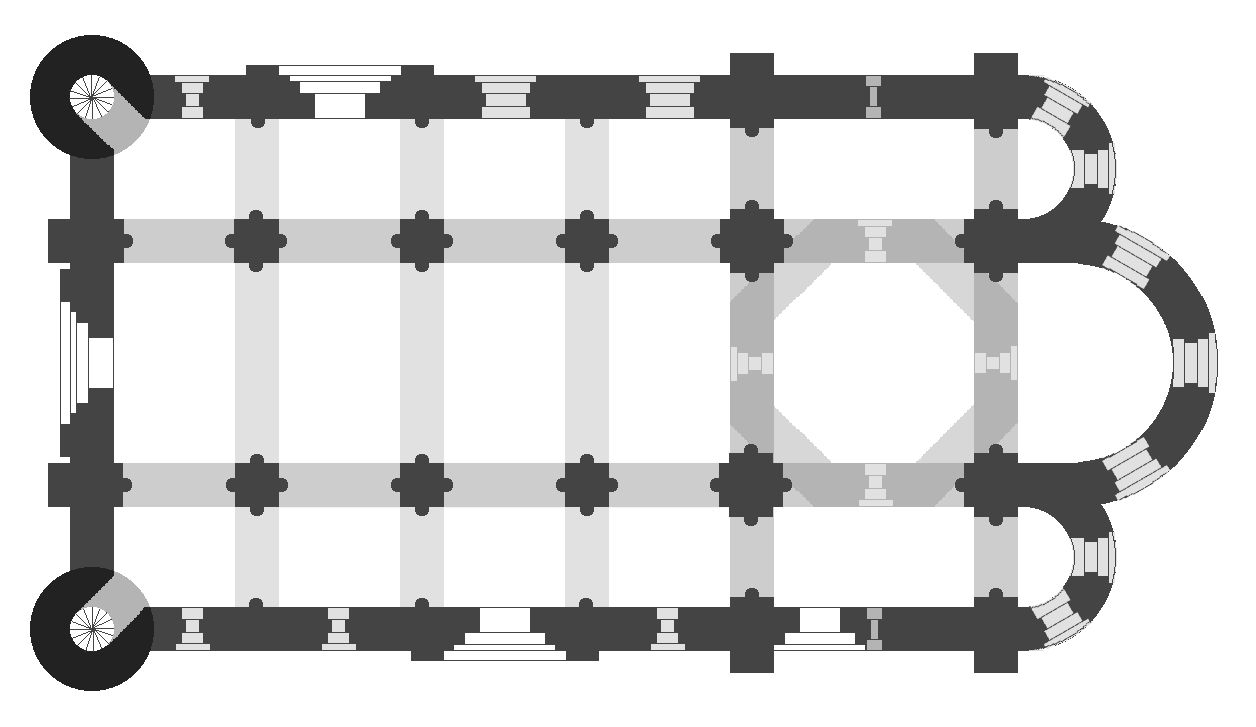
San Martin (Frómista).

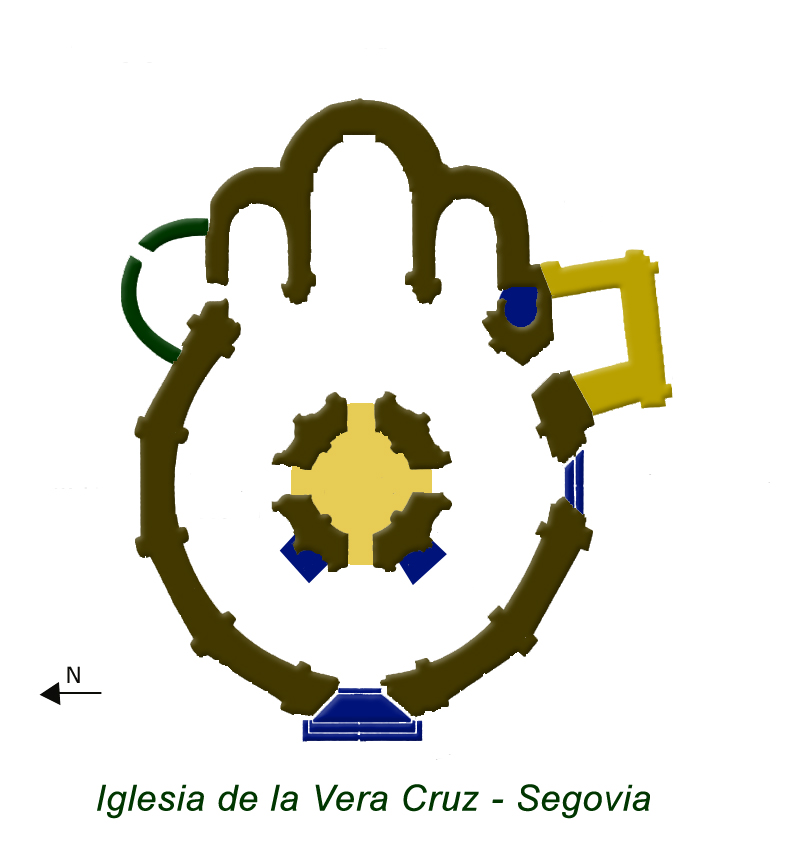
Vera Cruz (Segovia).

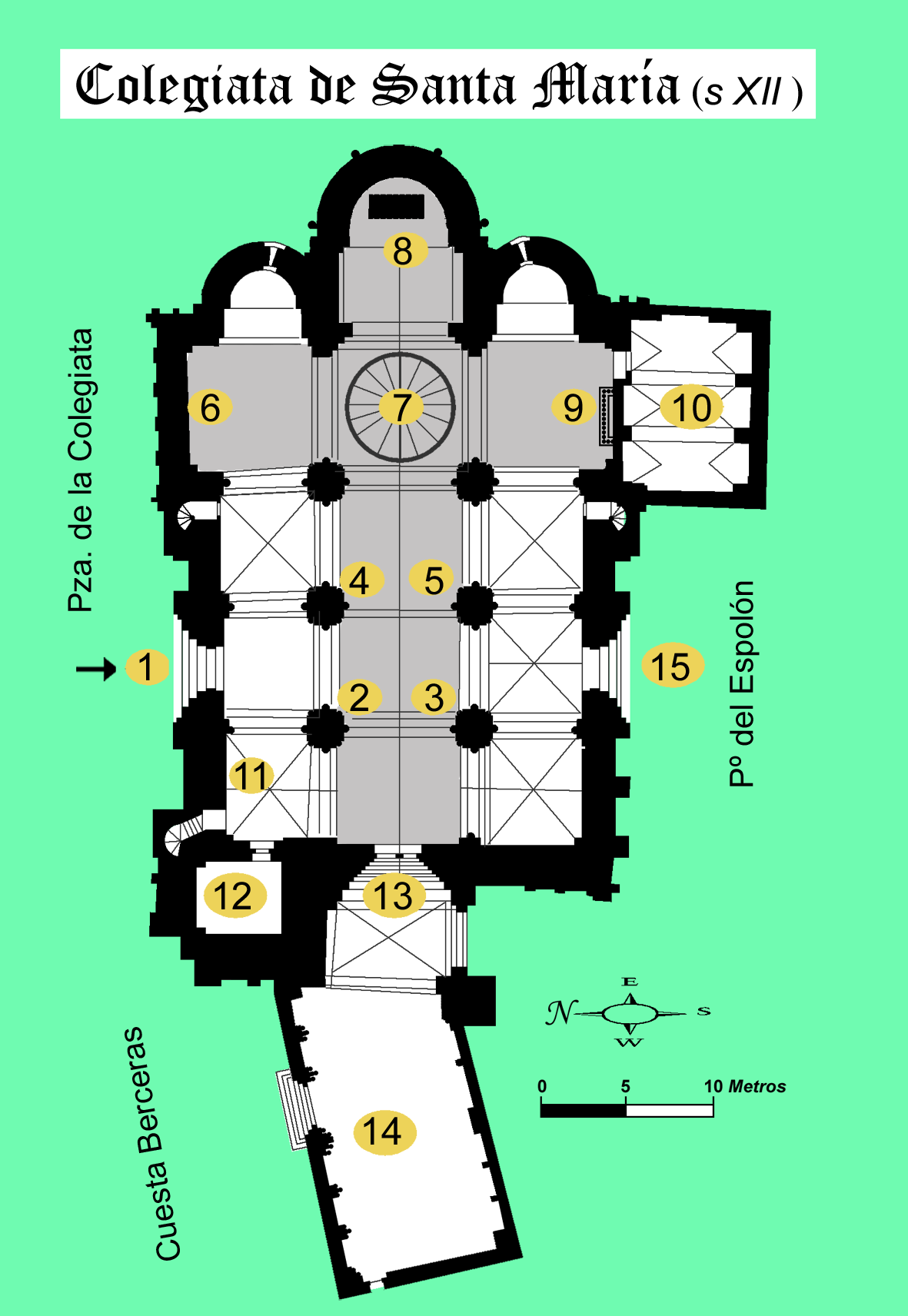
Santa Maria la Mayor (Toro).

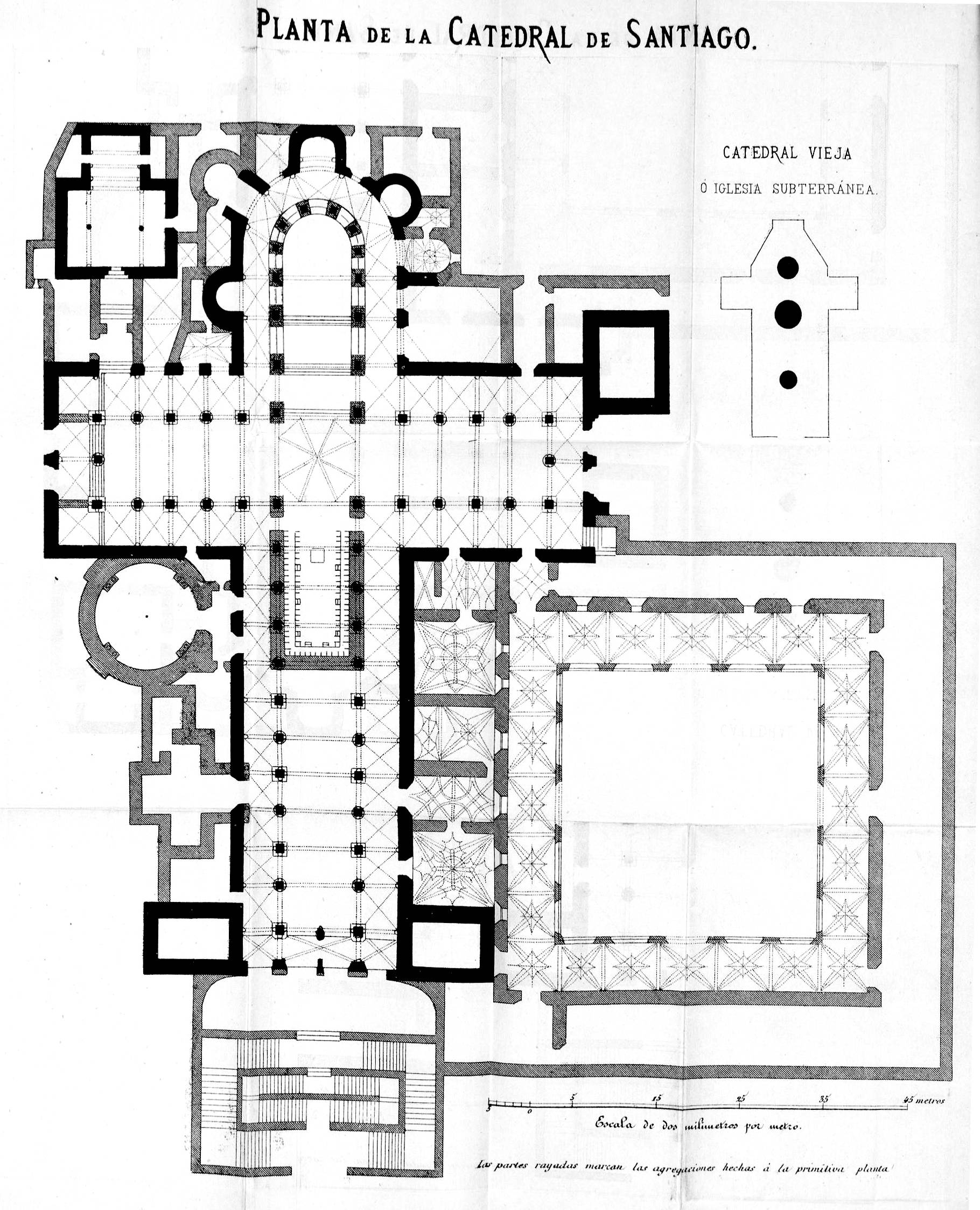
Cathedral of Santiago de Compostela.

Cathedral of Lisbon.

== Sculpture ==
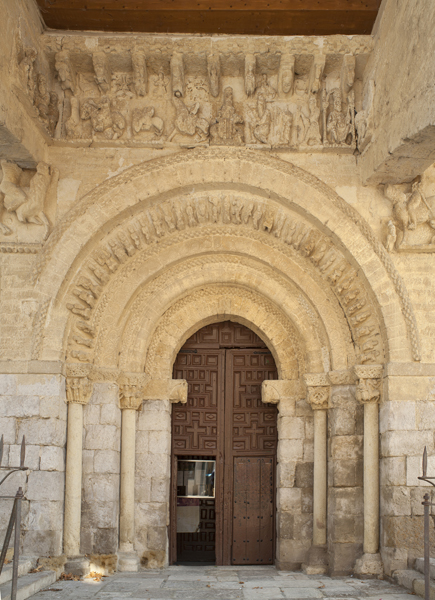
Carrión de los Condes.

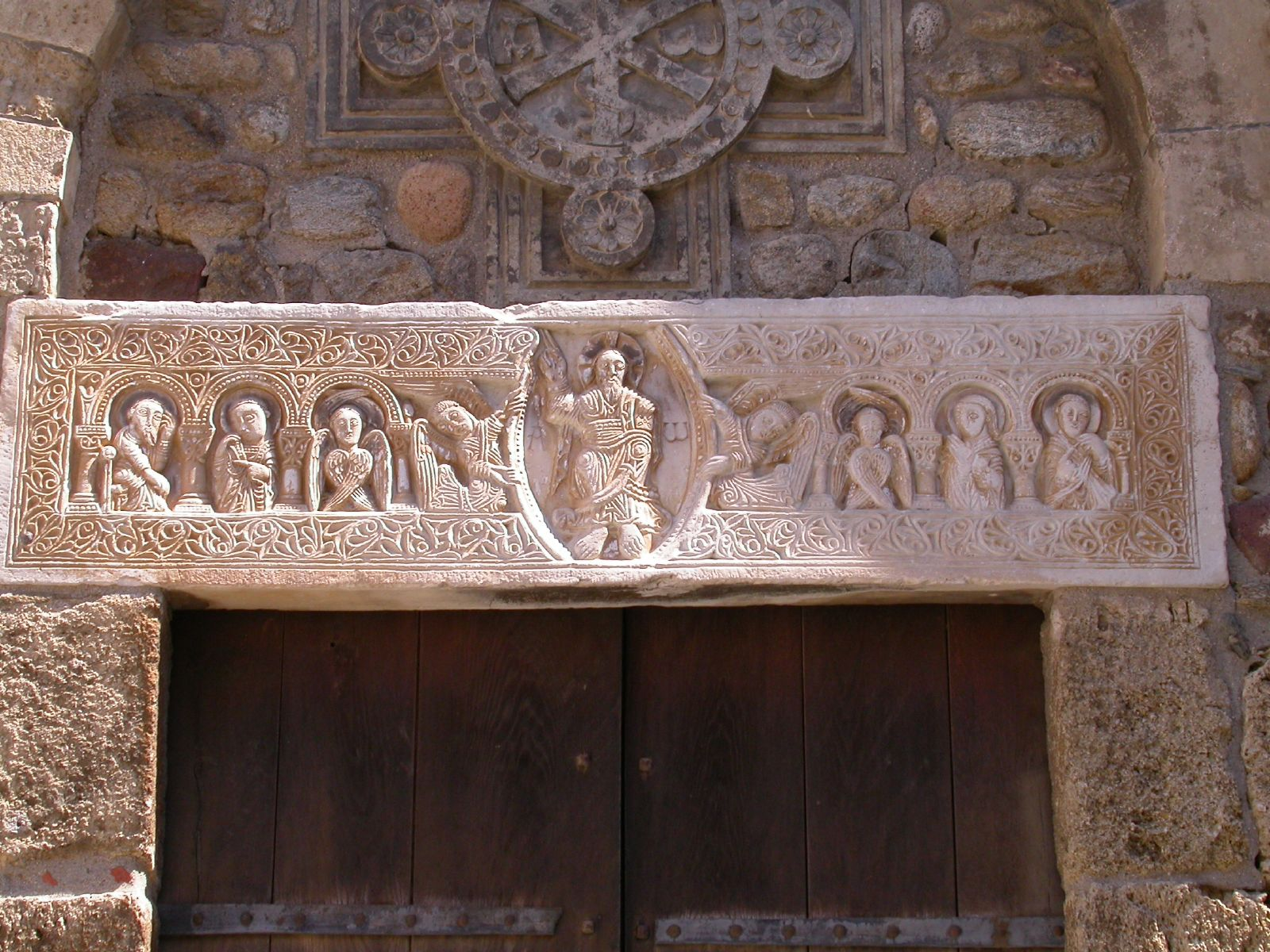
San Andrés de Sureda.

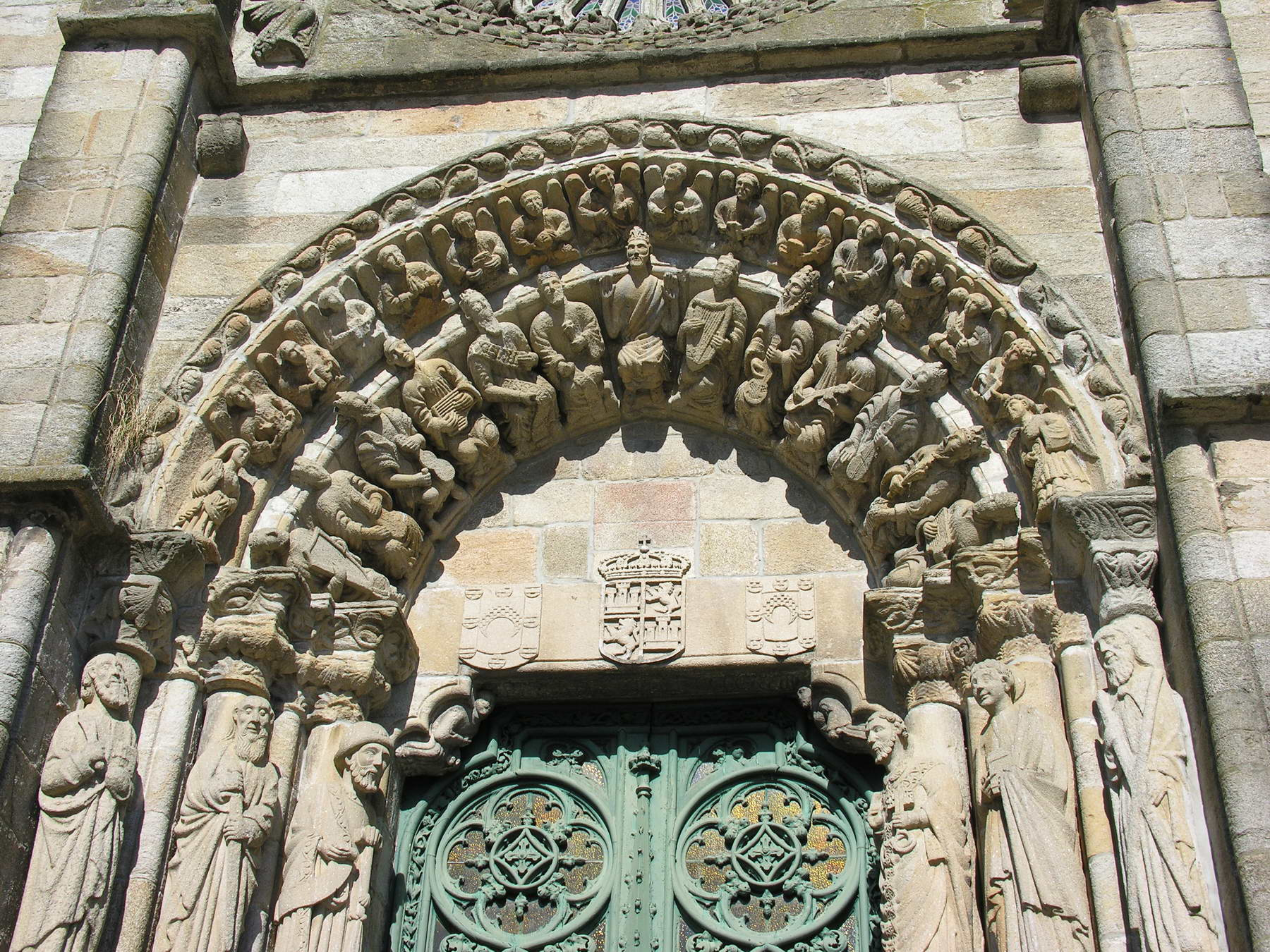
Facade of San Martiño (Noia).

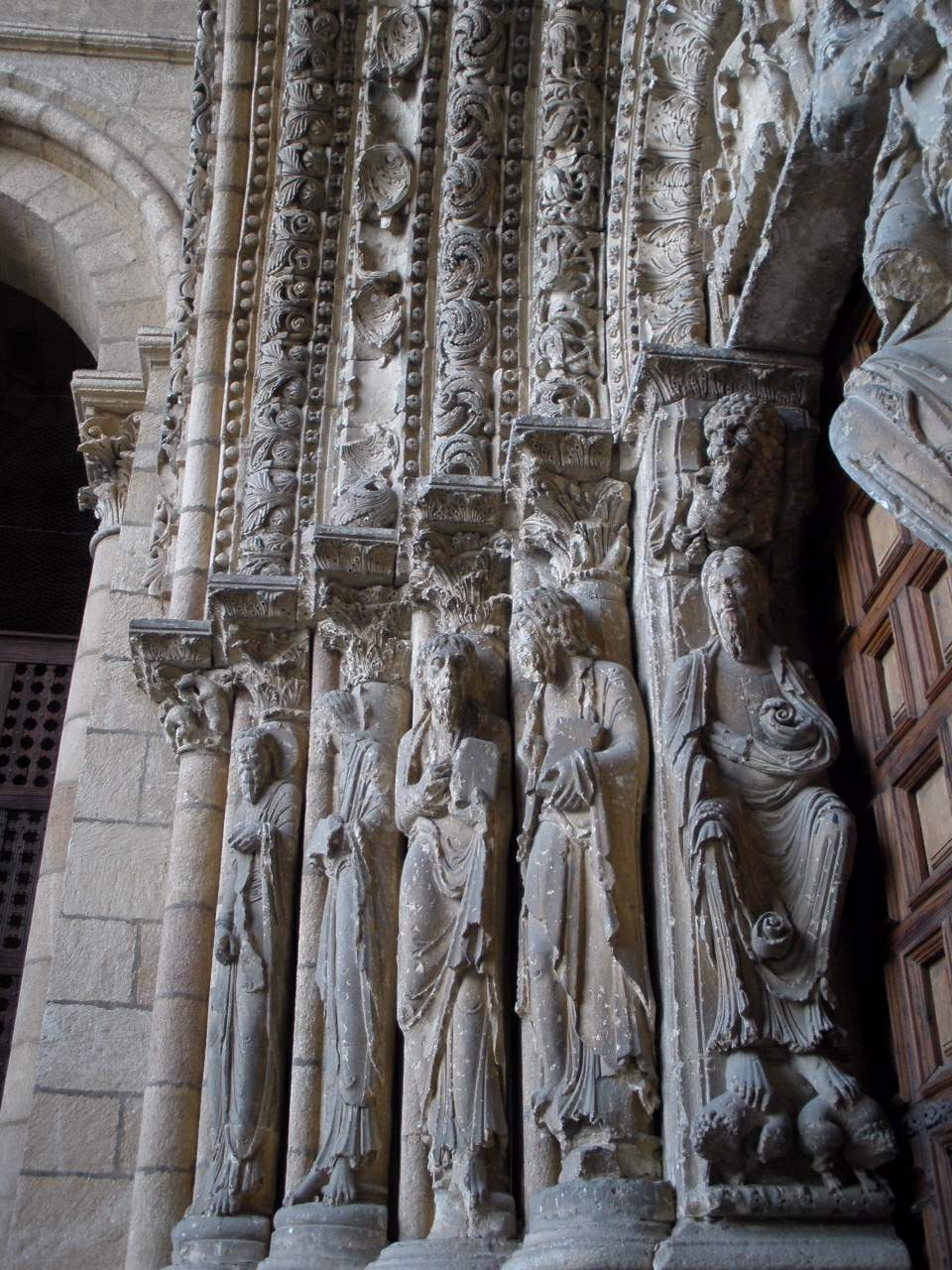
West facade of San Vicente (Ávila).

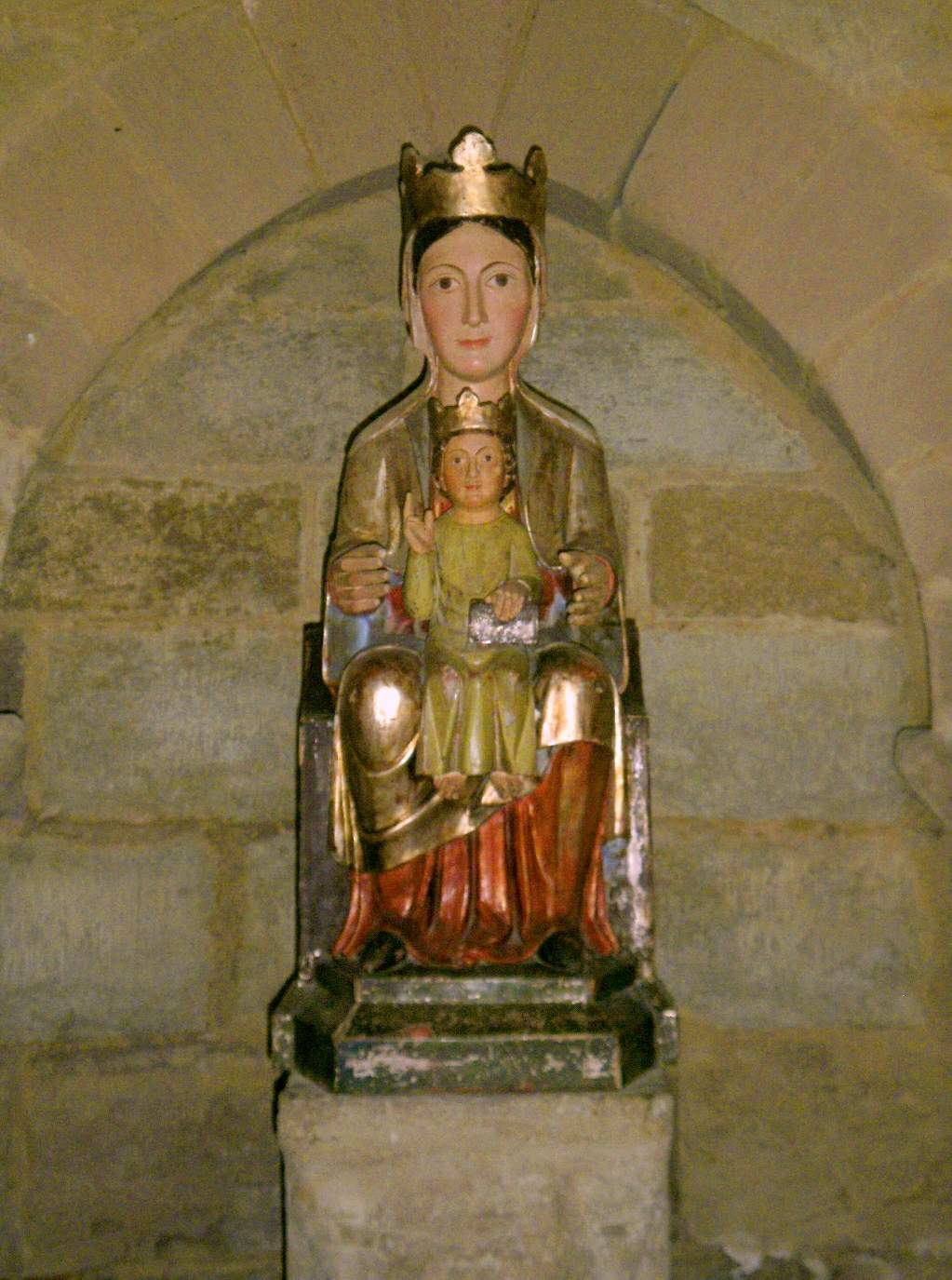
Eunateko Andre Maria.

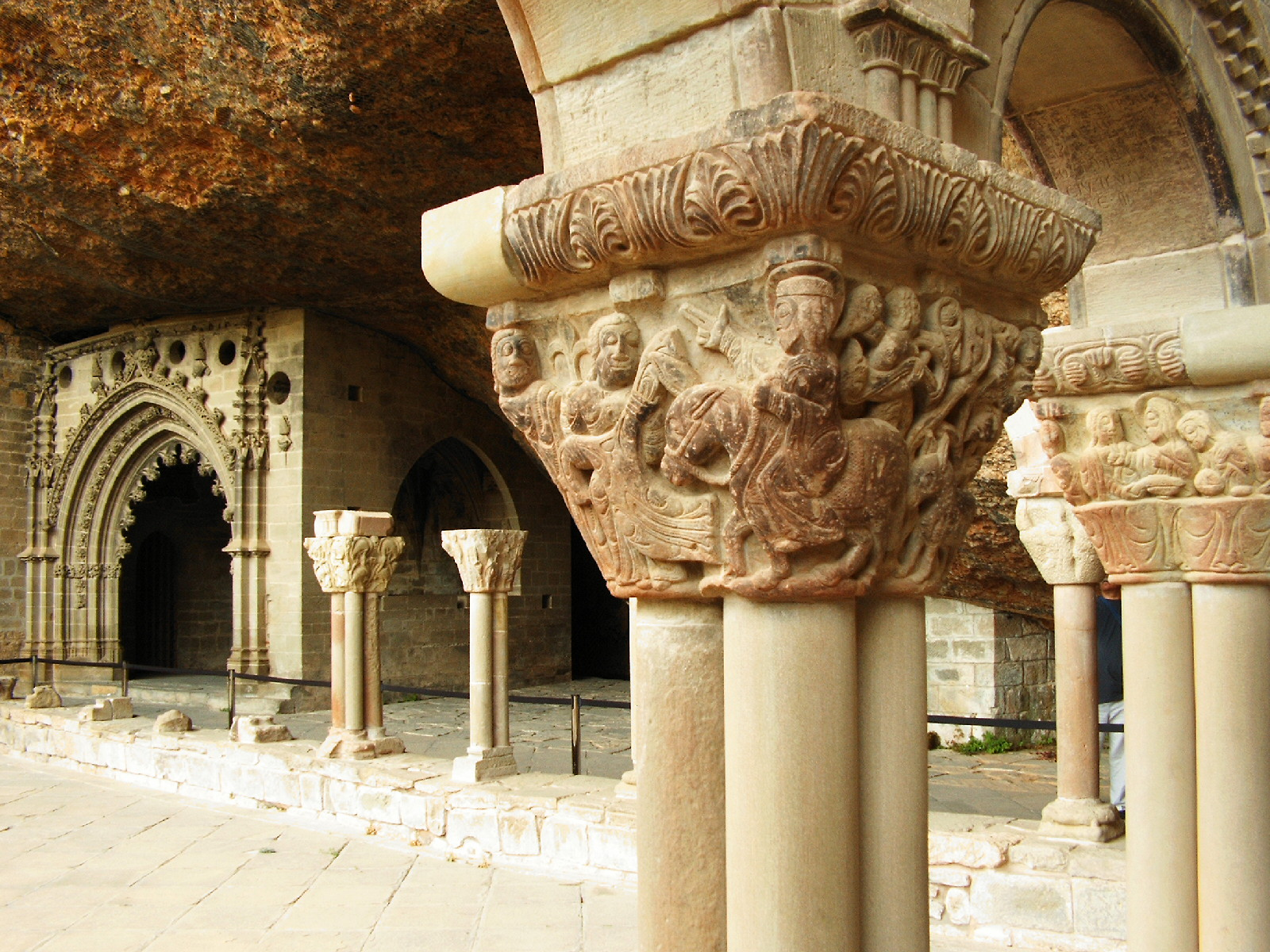
Cloister of Monastery of San Juan de la Peña.

The earliest works of Romanesque sculpture in the Hispanic-Christian peninsular kingdoms are two lintels of the Roussillon area which share similar iconography. One can be found in the Saint-Génis-des-Fontaines Abbey (dated in 1020) and the other in the monastery of Sant Andreu de Sureda. Also from the 11th century are the tympanum of the Cathedral of Jaca, the gables of San Isidoro (León), the Platerías façade of the Cathedral of Santiago de Compostela from Master Esteban and the cloister of the monastery of Santo Domingo de Silos.

The most outstanding examples from the 12th century are the façades of Santa Maria de Ripoll, of the Church of Santa María la Real, Sangüesa, of the monastery of San Pedro el Viejo (Huesca) and the cloister of the monastery of San Juan de la Peña. To the late 12th century belong the facades of the Church of Santa María del Camino (Carrión de los Condes) and Santo Domingo (Soria). The transition to Gothic is visible in some works of this period: the apostolate of the Cámara Santa (Oviedo), the facade of San Vicente (Ávila) and the Portico of Glory of the Cathedral of Santiago de Cosmpostela authored by Master Mateo. Another of the early sculptors was Arnau Cadell who produced the capitals of the cloister of Sant Cugat.

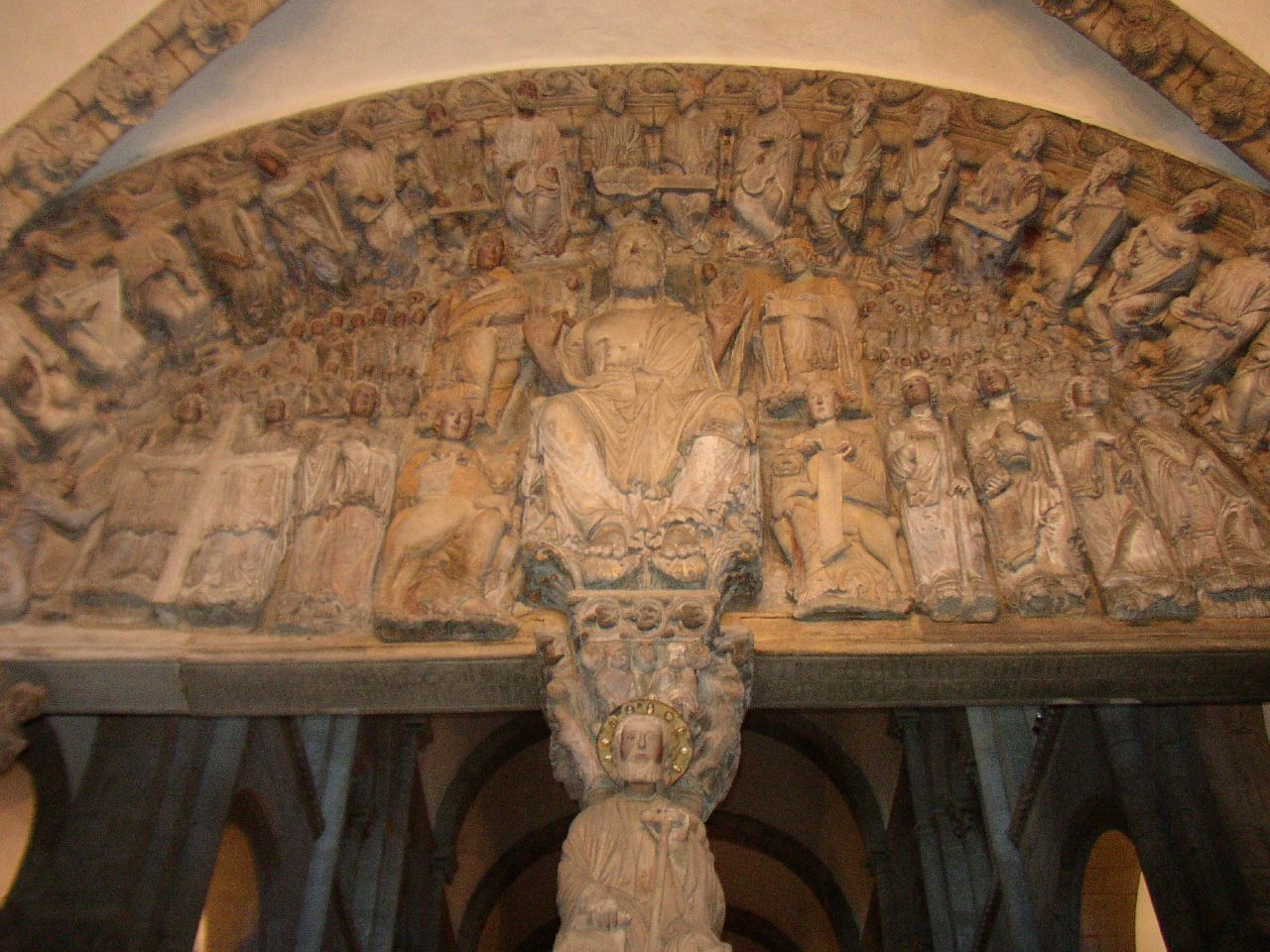
Portico of Glory.

The round bulge carvings that have been preserved in polychrome wood usually depict either the Christ crucified in the type called Majesty or the Madonna with Child in the type called sedes sapientiae ("Seat of Wisdom"). An exceptional sculptural group is the Davallament of Sant Joan de les Abadesses, which shows the transition to the Gothic style.

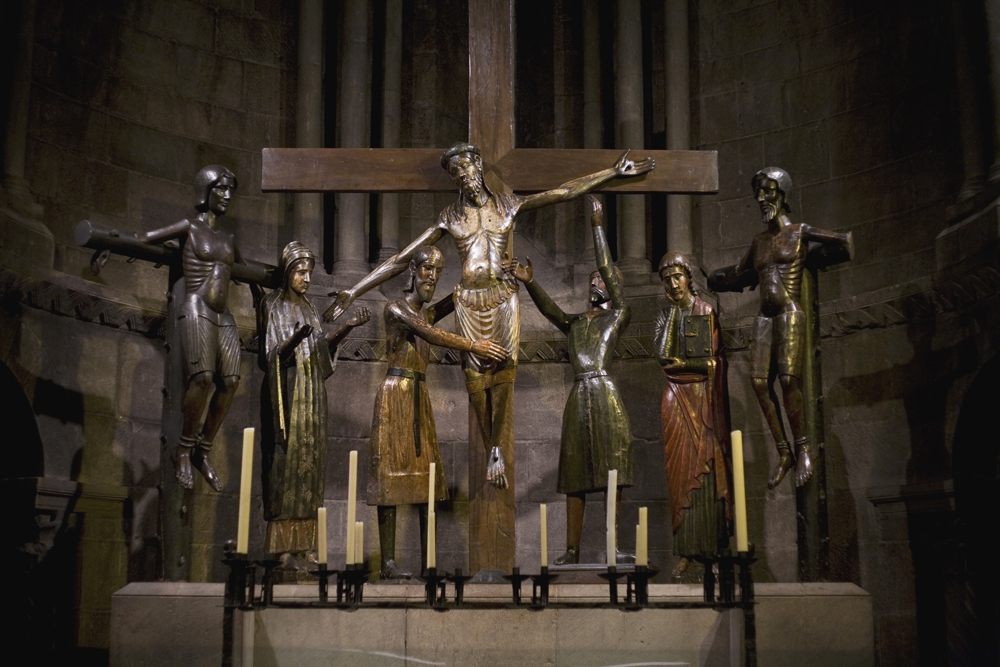
Davallament of Sant Joan de les Abadesses

== Painting ==
Spanish Romanesque can boast some outstanding frescoes such as the Pantheon of the Kings of San Isidoro (León), retained 'in situ', or those removed from their original locations such as San Baudelio de Berlanga and the hermitage of la Vera Cruz (Maderuelo), both in the Prado, and the collection assembled in the National Art Museum of Catalonia.

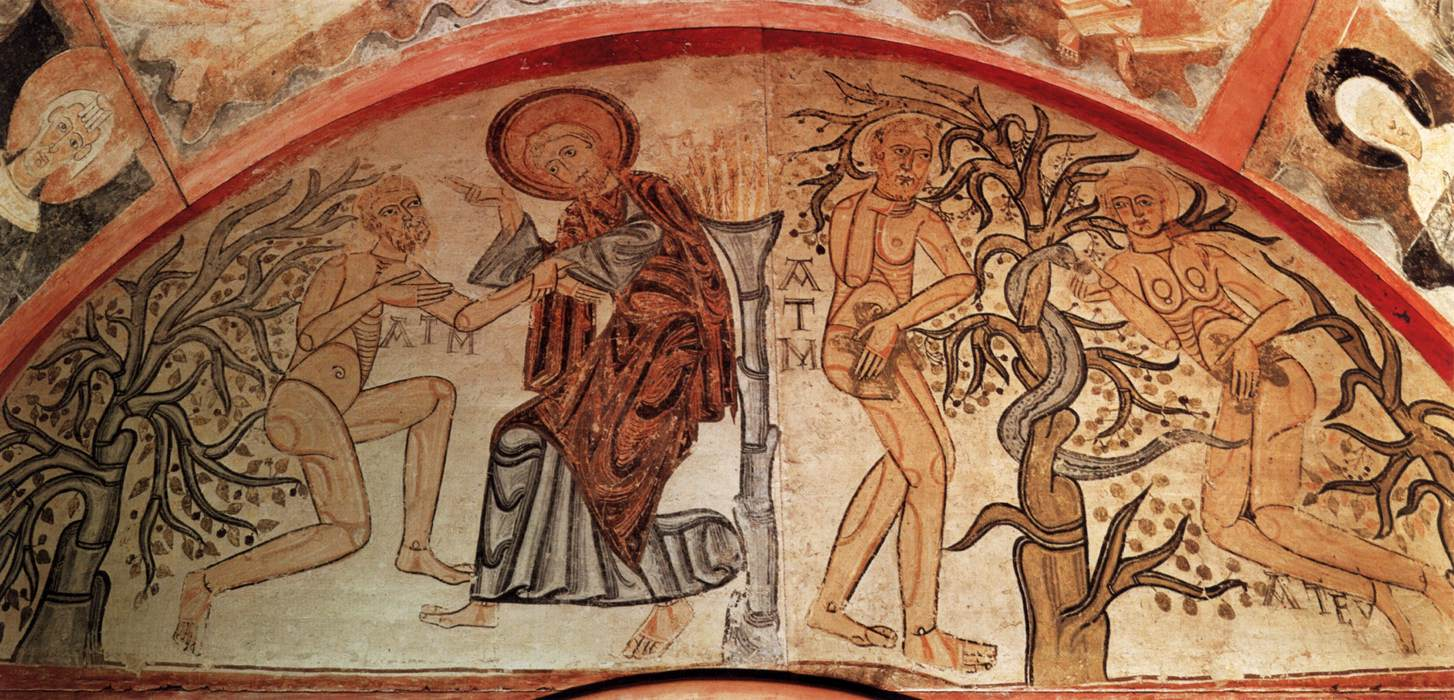
Creation of Adam and Original Sin. Hermitage of la Vera Cruz (Maderuelo).

Panel painting produced antependiums or altar frontals that specially in Catalonia absorbed the Italian-Byzantine influence from the 12th century (Altar frontal from La Seu d'Urgell or of The Apostles). In the later period painting evolved to the Gothic style, of higher narrative capacity and lesser stiffness (Altar frontal from Avià).

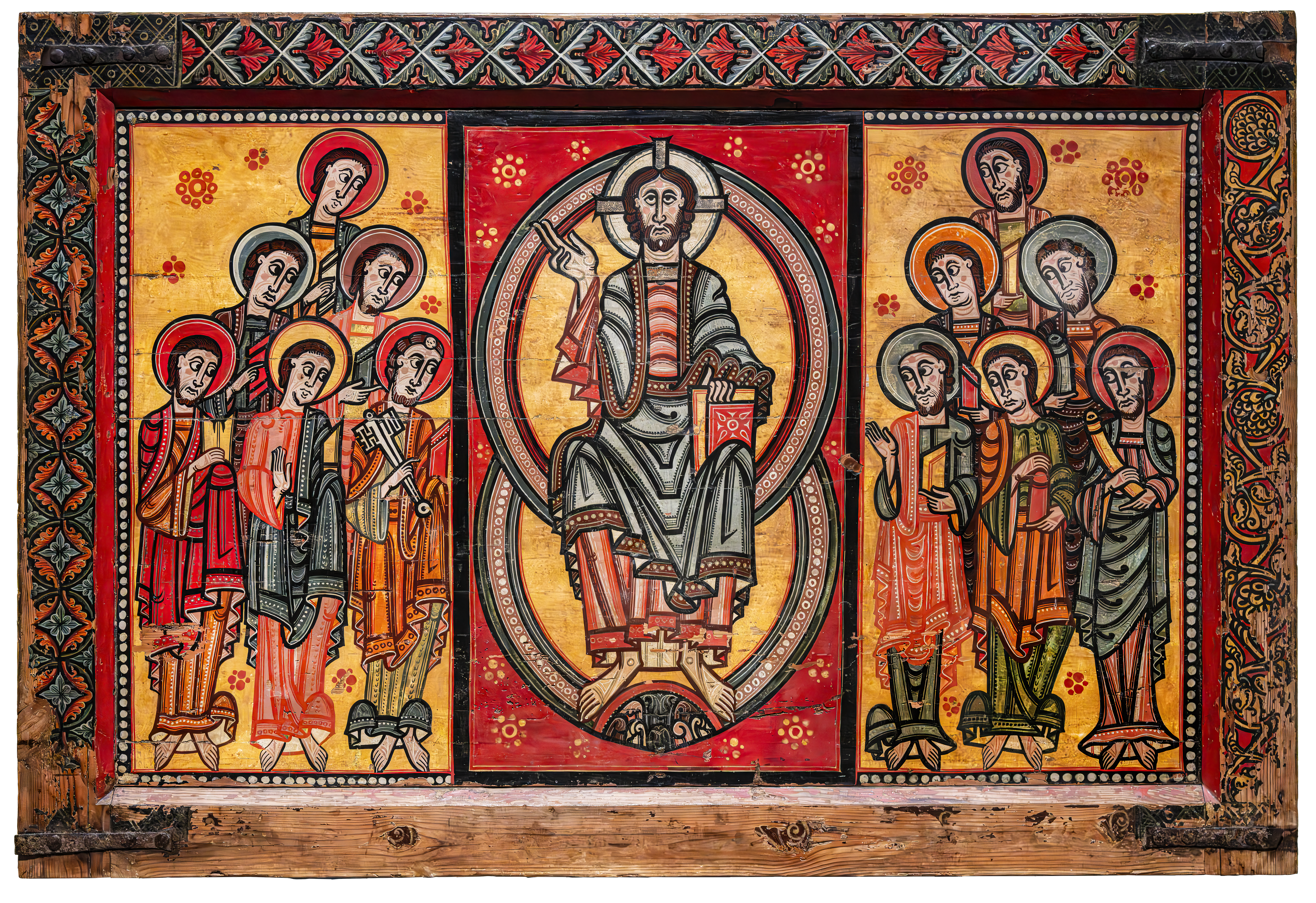
Front of Seu d'Urgell or of the Apostle

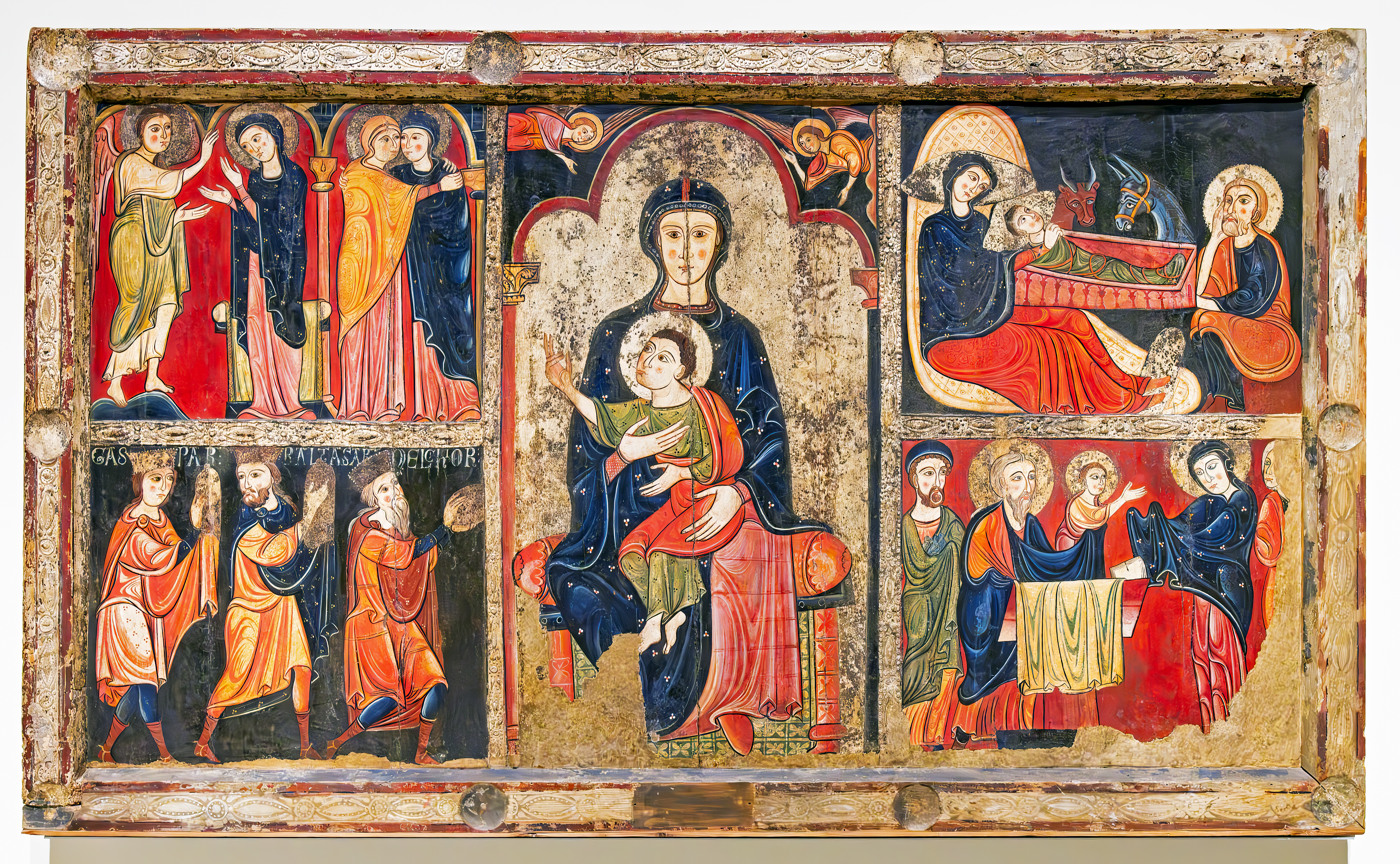
Front Avià.

== Sumptuary arts ==
The preparation of manuscripts in the monasteries and cathedrals scriptoriums was an outstanding activity that continued the tradition of Beatus de Liébana's Commentary on the Apocalypse and incorporated European influences. Some of the best examples include the Libro de los testamentos, the Tumbos compostelanos and the Codex Calixtinus.

Some excellent examples of textiles from liturgical vestments and tapestries have survived such as the Tapestry of Creation of the Cathedral of Girona.

The Ivory carving of Andalusian influence developed an important workshop at the Leonese court.

Goldsmiths produced elaborated pieces such as the Cáliz de las Ágatas also called "of Doña Urraca" -ca 1063- and the Ark of San Isidoro. Some artists incorporated the Limoges enamels technique as can be seen in the Frontal of Santo Domingo de Silos).

== Areas ==
Examples ordered geographically, from east to west

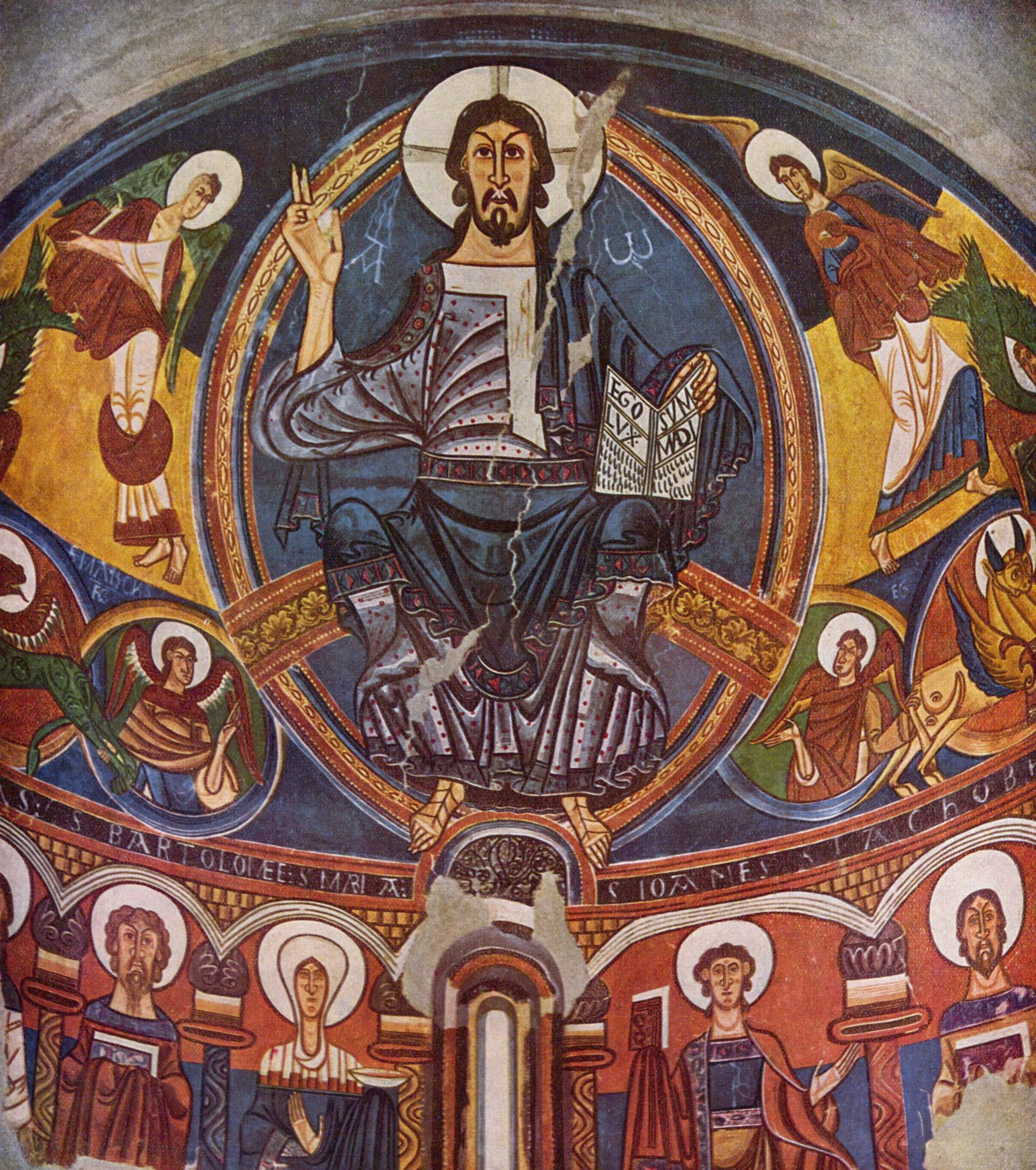
Frescos de Sant Climent de Taüll.

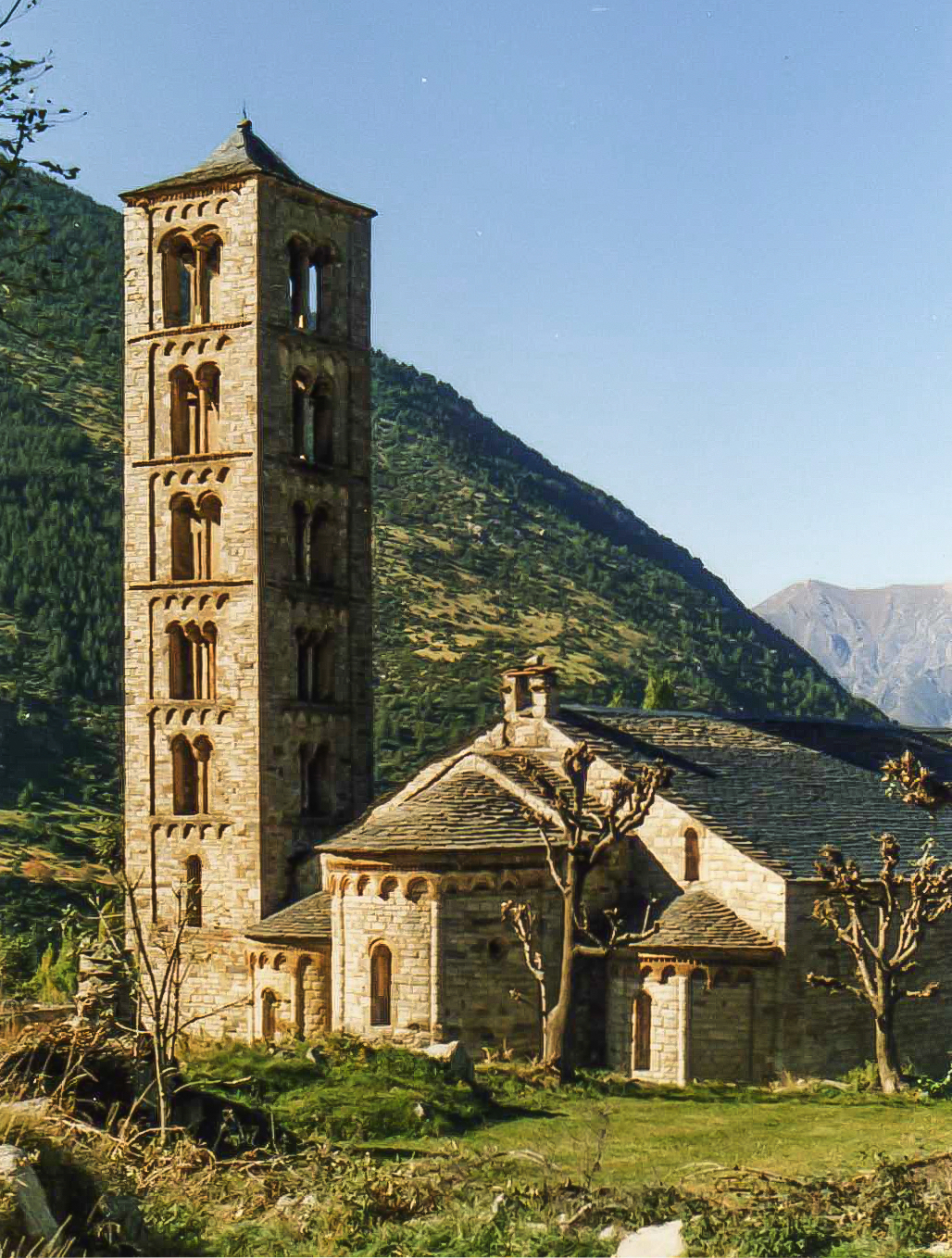
Tower and apses of Sant Climent de Taüll.

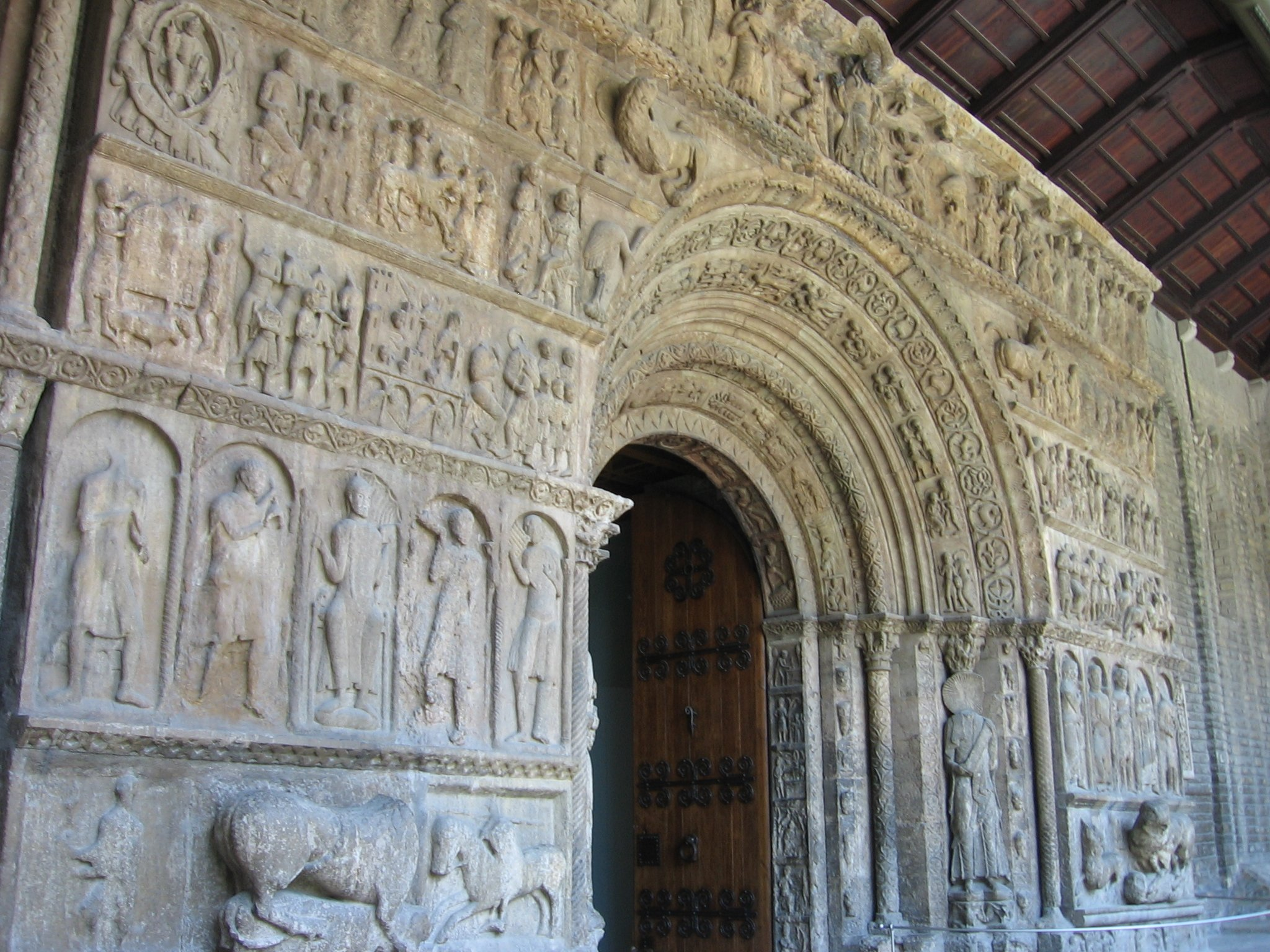
Portico of the church of Santa Maria de Ripoll.

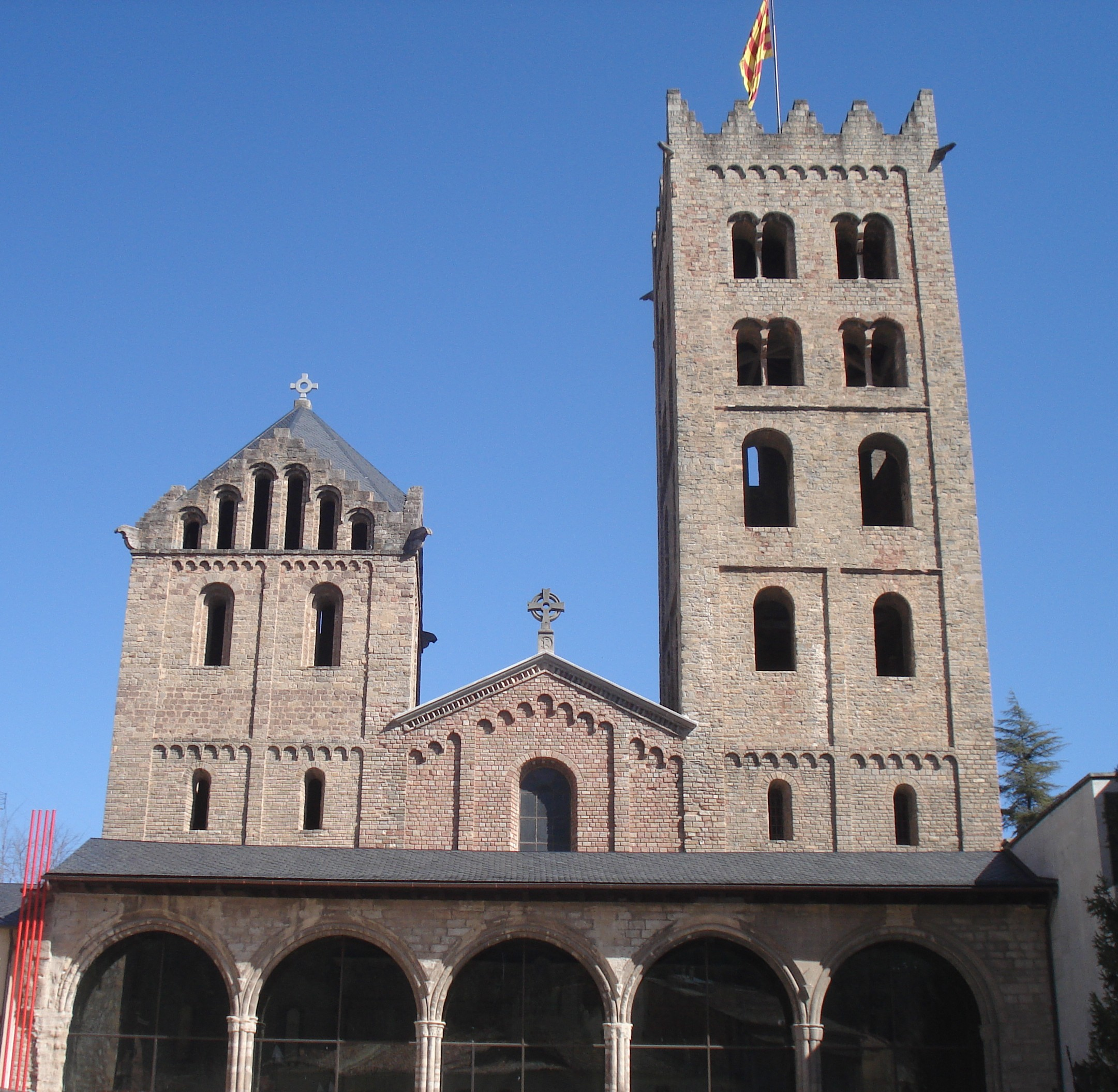
Facade and towers of Ripoll.

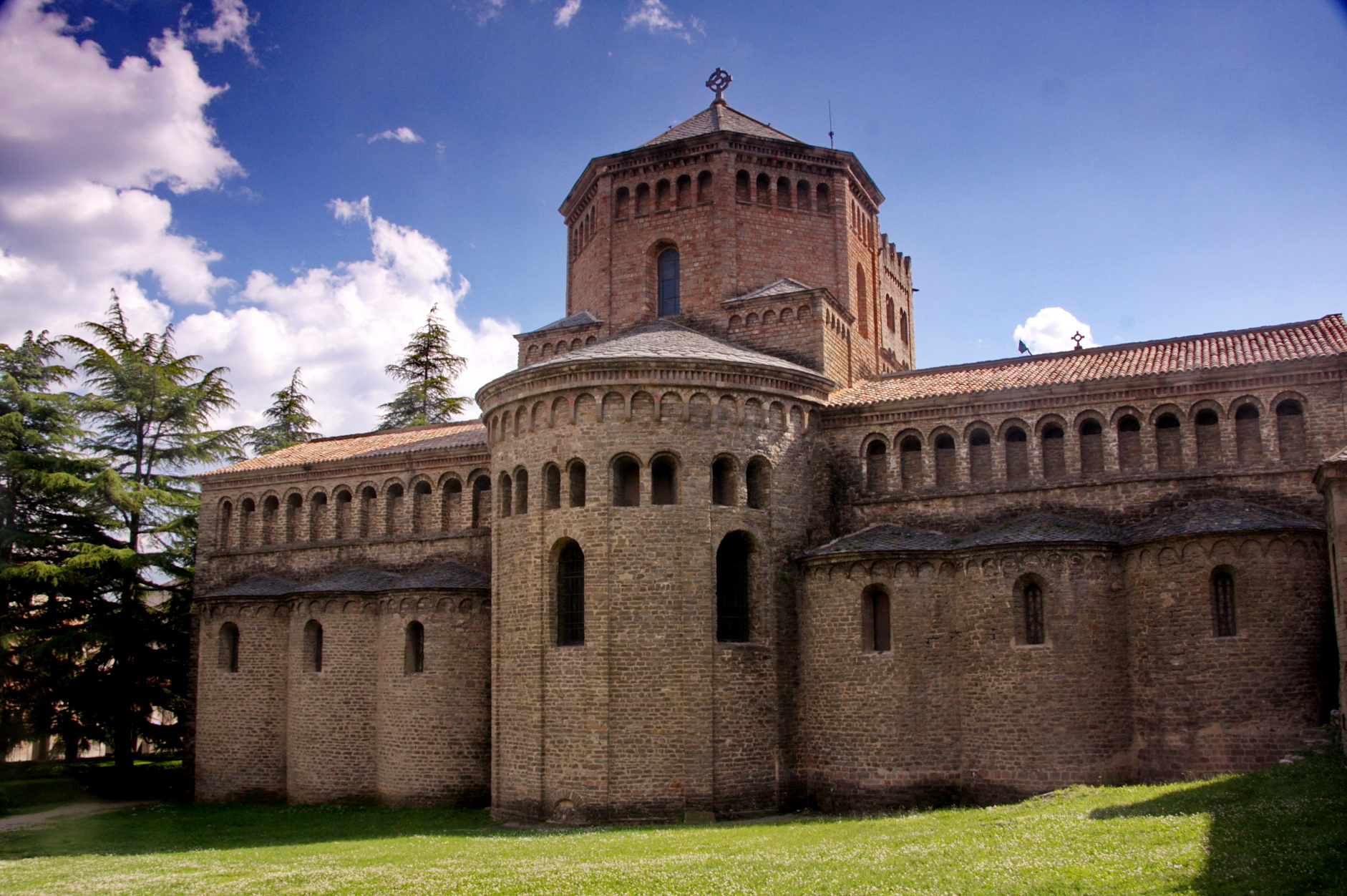
Apses and dome of Ripoll.

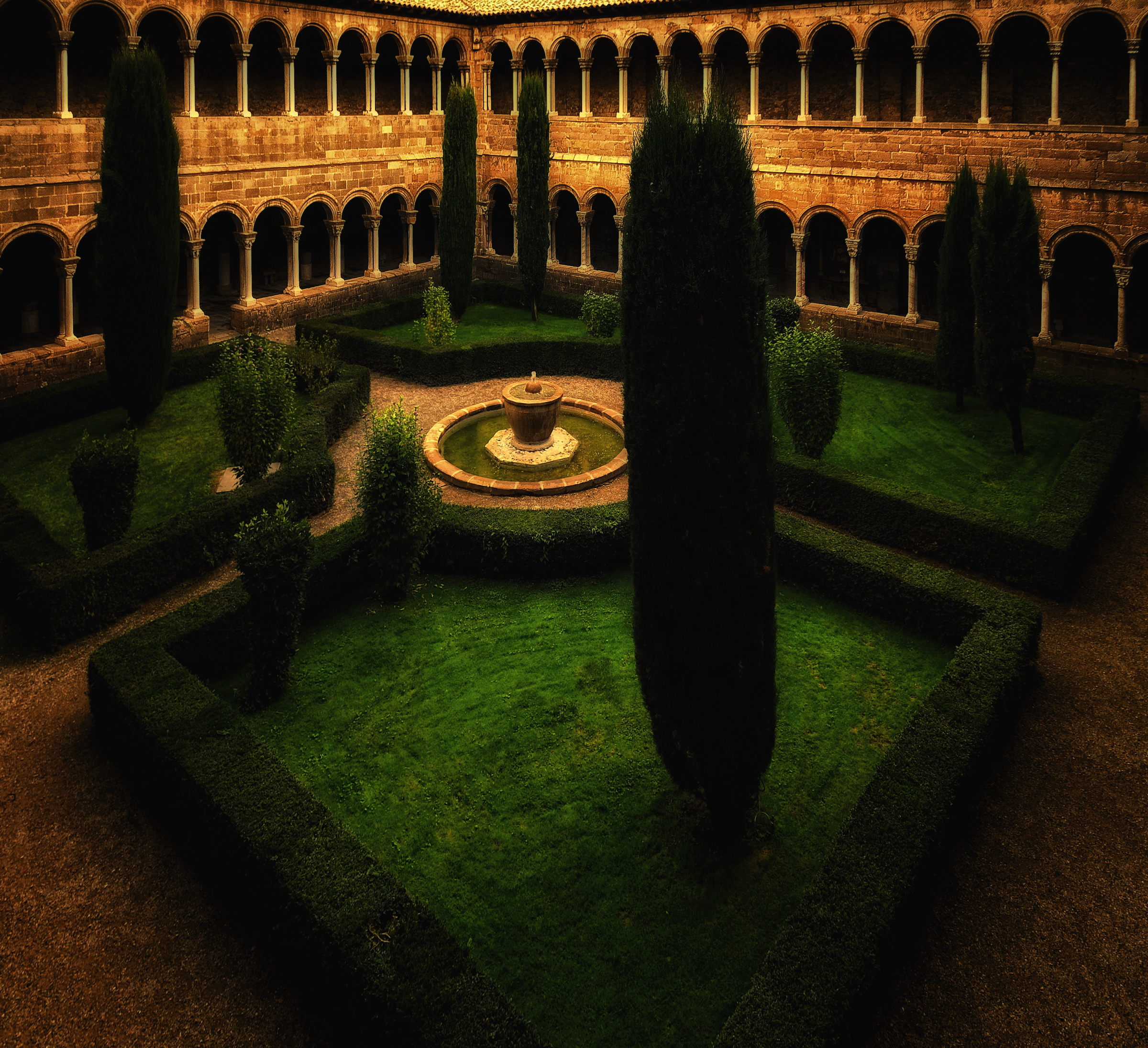
Cloister of Ripoll.

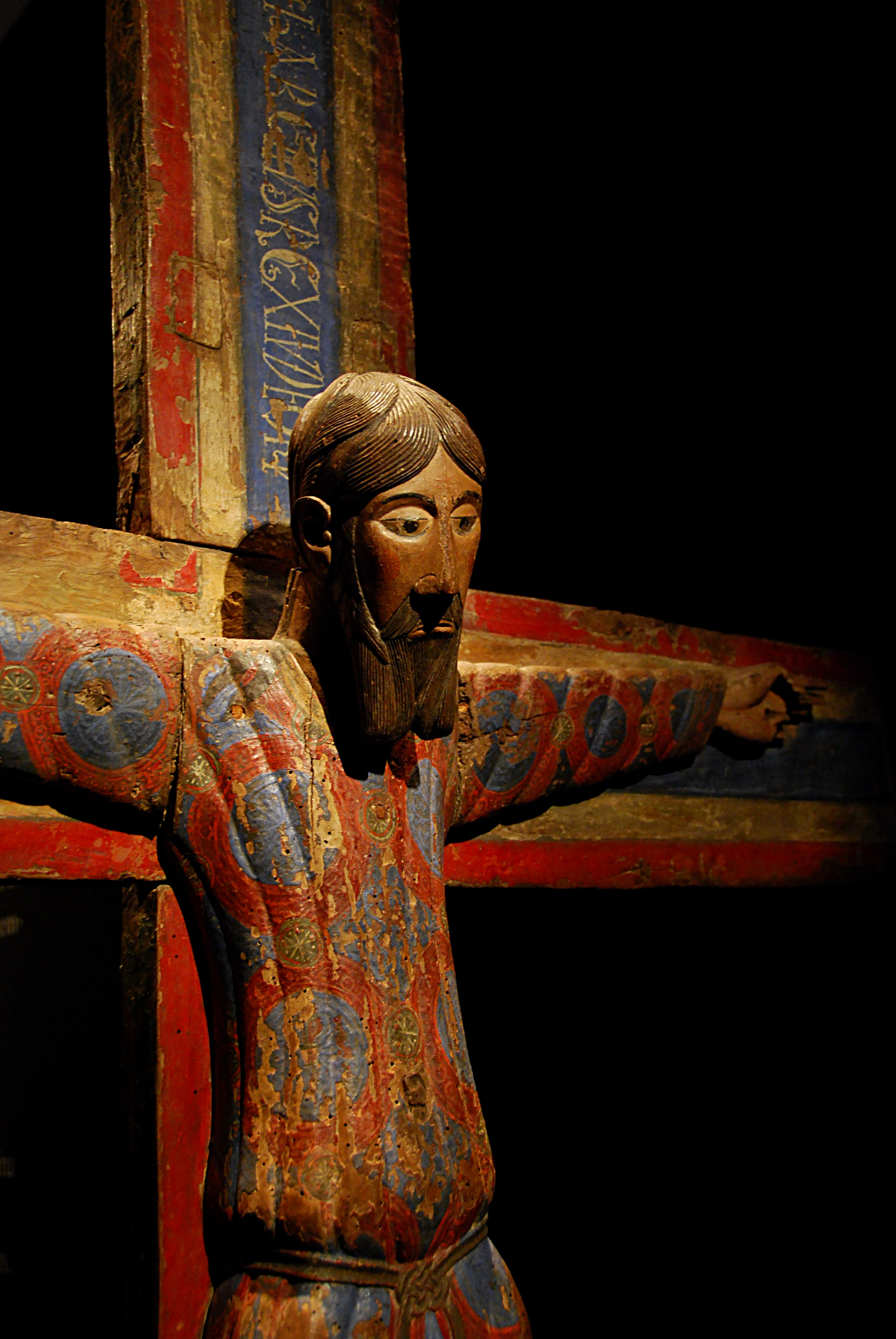
Batlló Majesty.

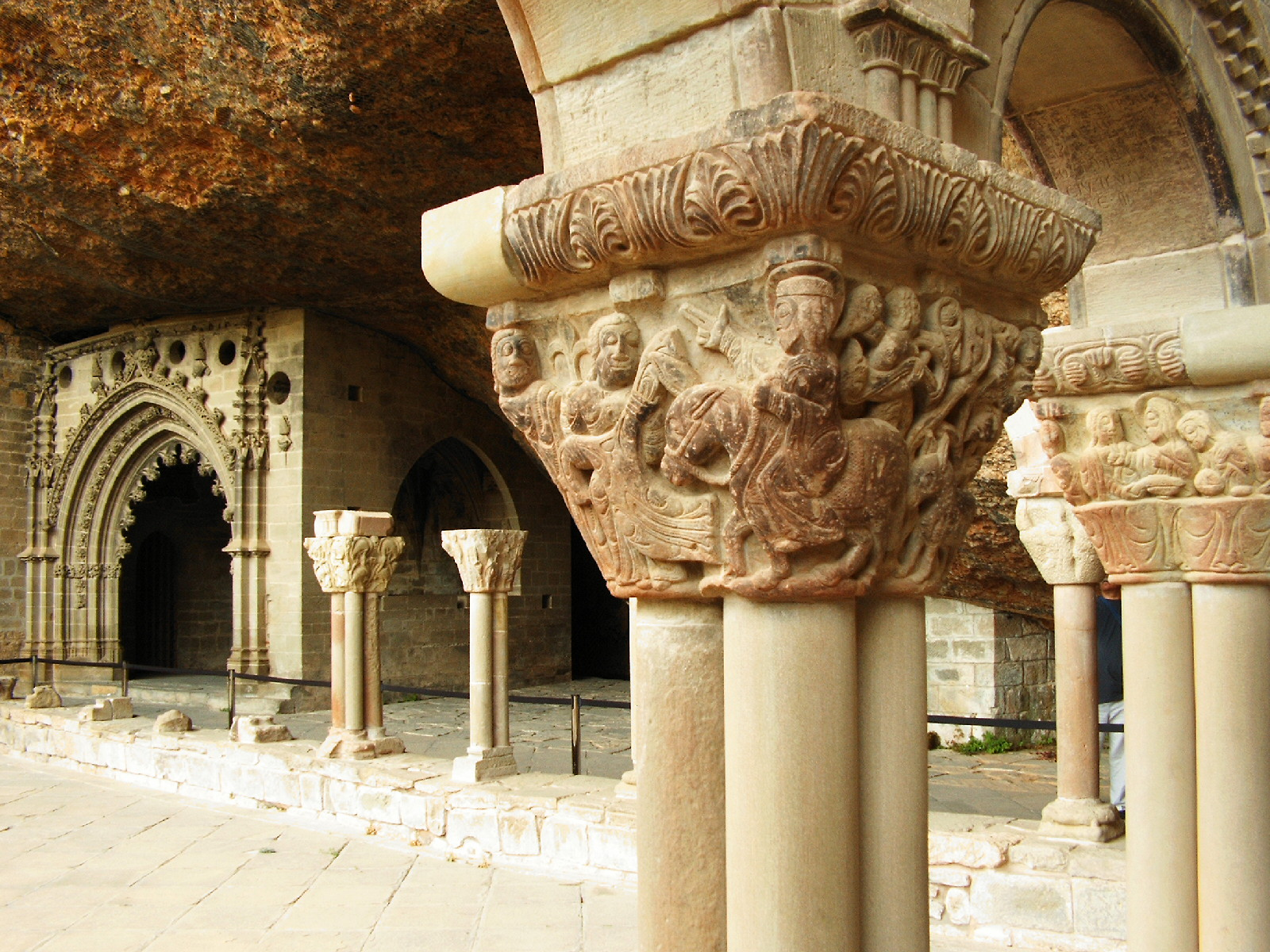
San Juan de la Peña.

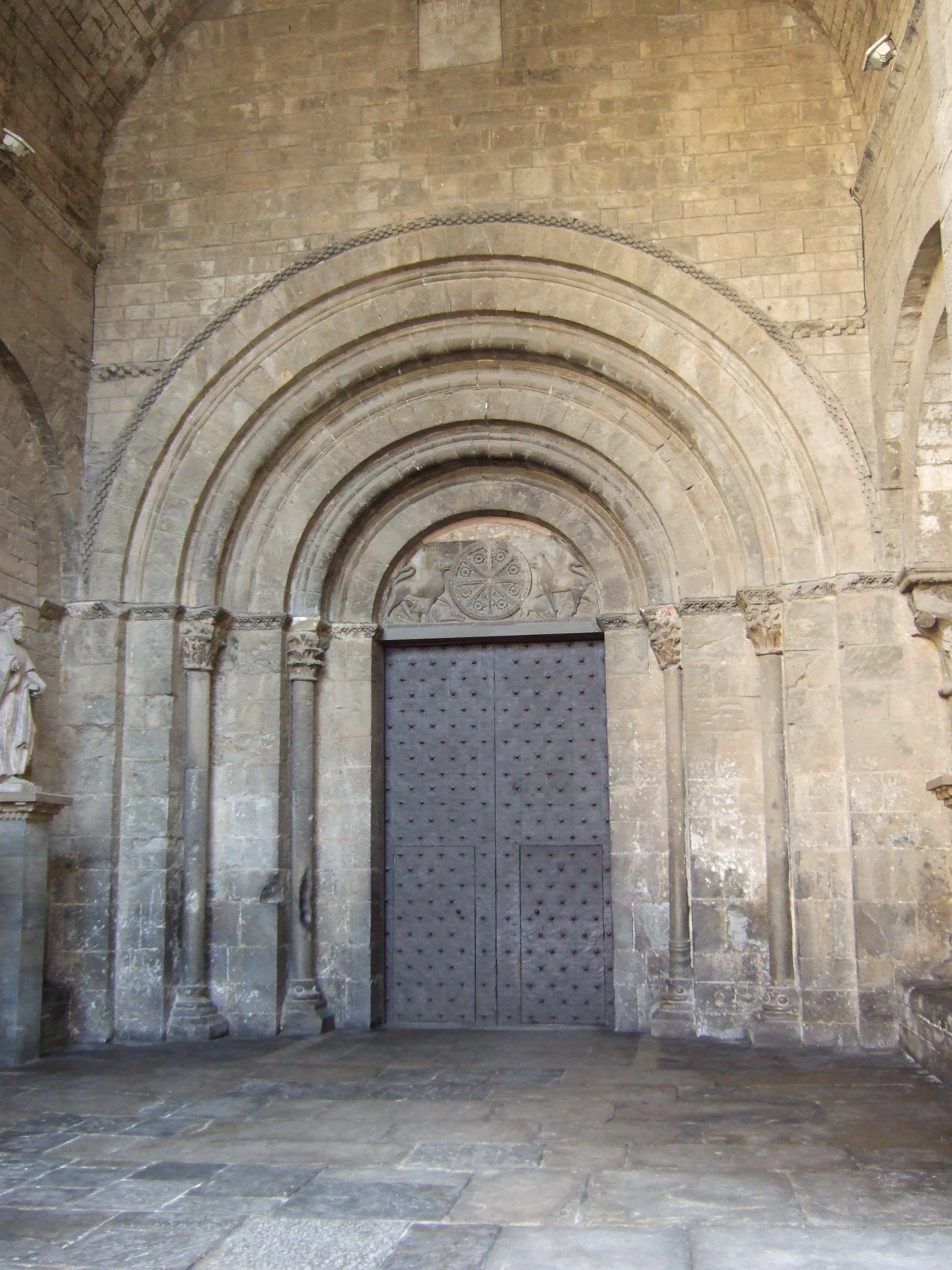
Western Front of the Cathedral of Jaca.

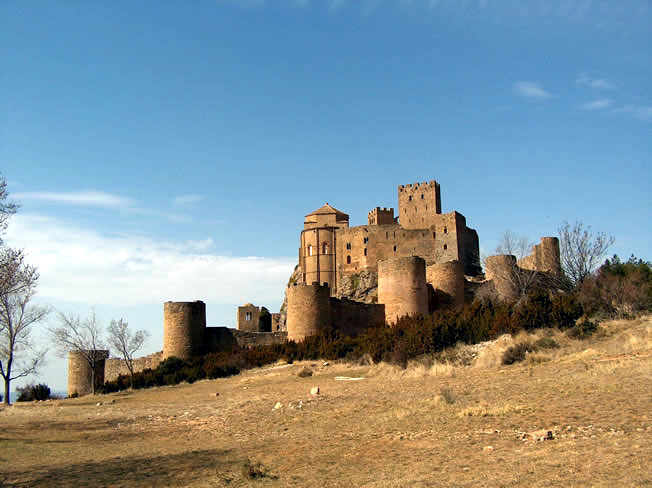
Castle of Loarre.

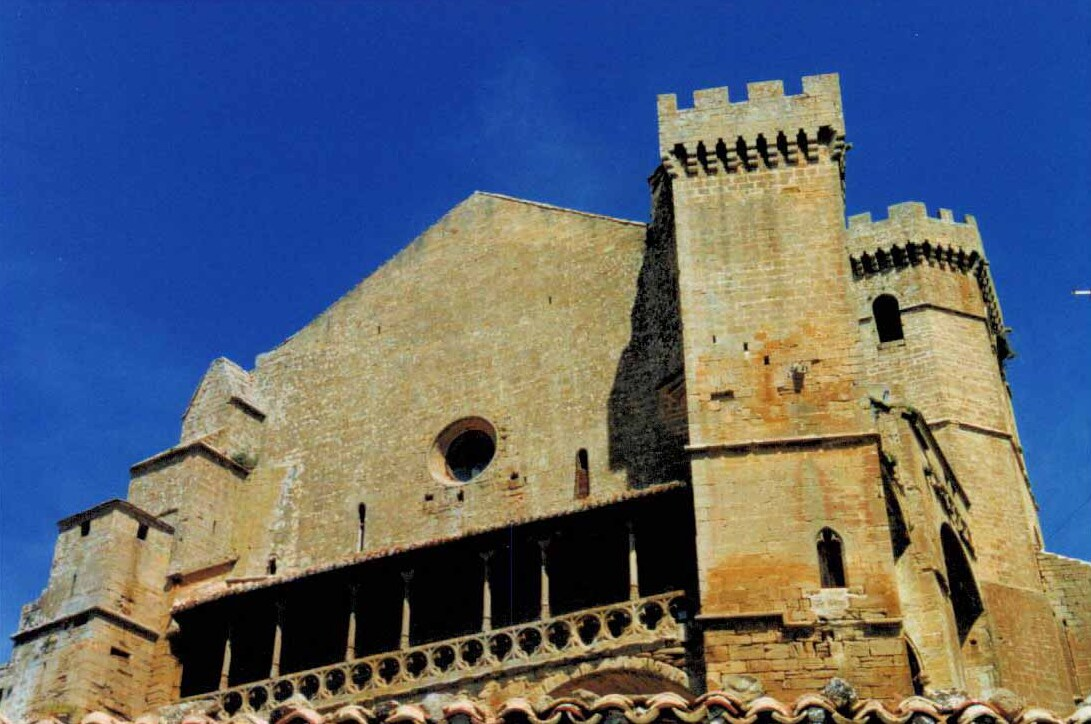
Church-castle of Ujué.

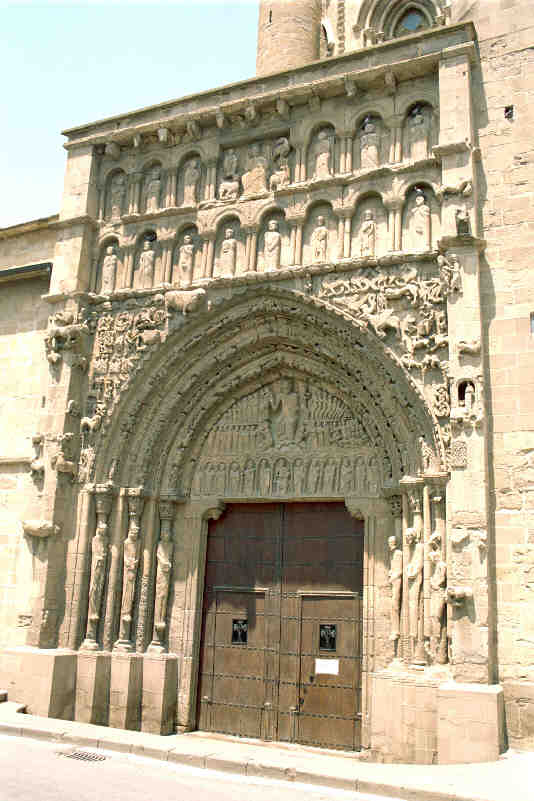
Portal of Andre Maria erreginaren eliza (Zangoza/Sangüesa).

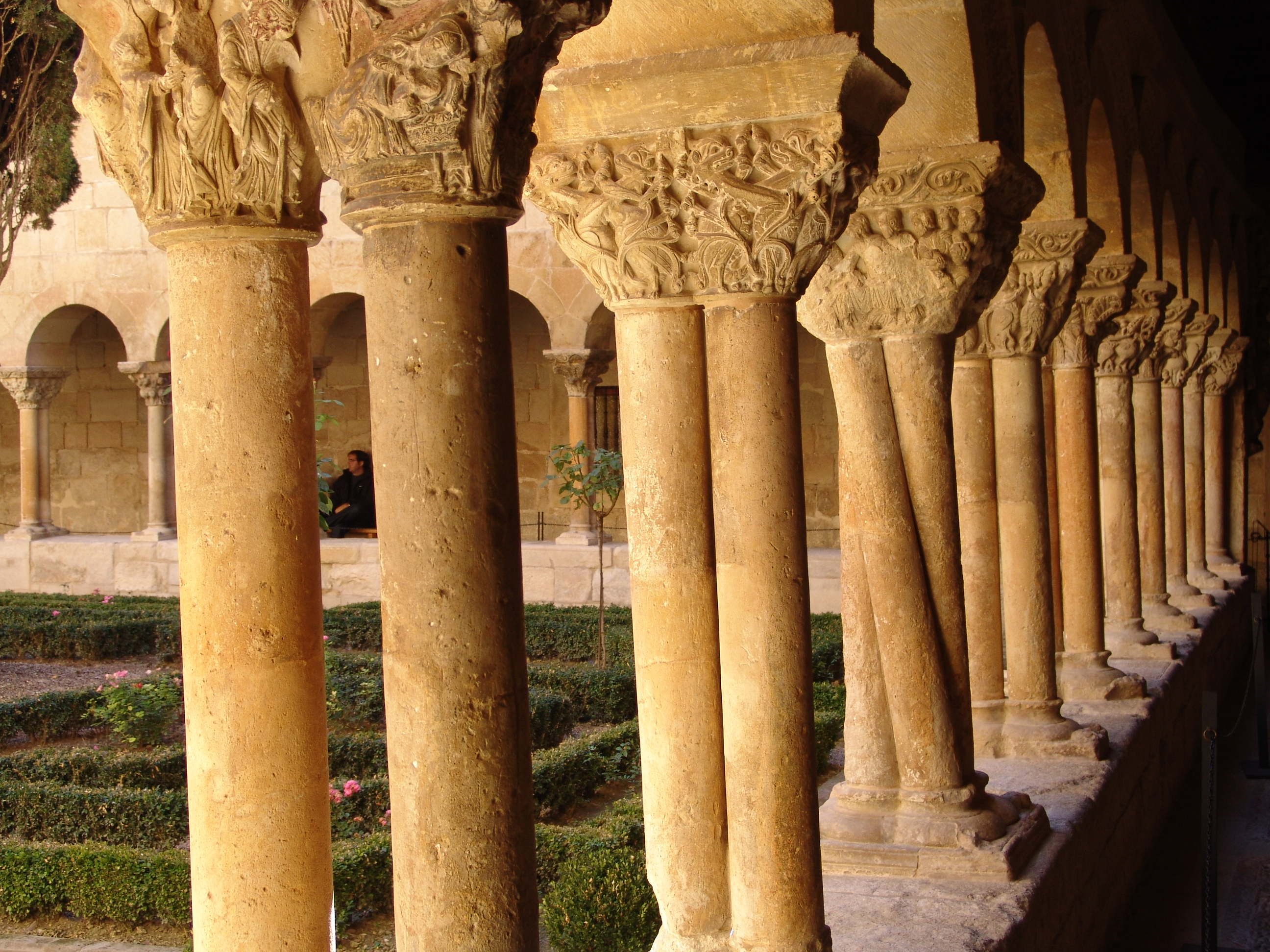
Cloister of Santo Domingo de Silos.

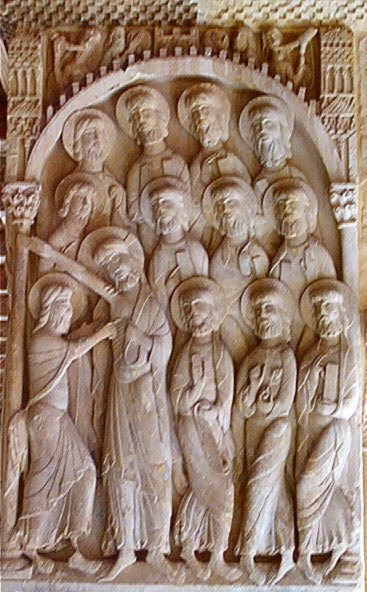
The doubt of St. Thomas, in the cloister of Silos.

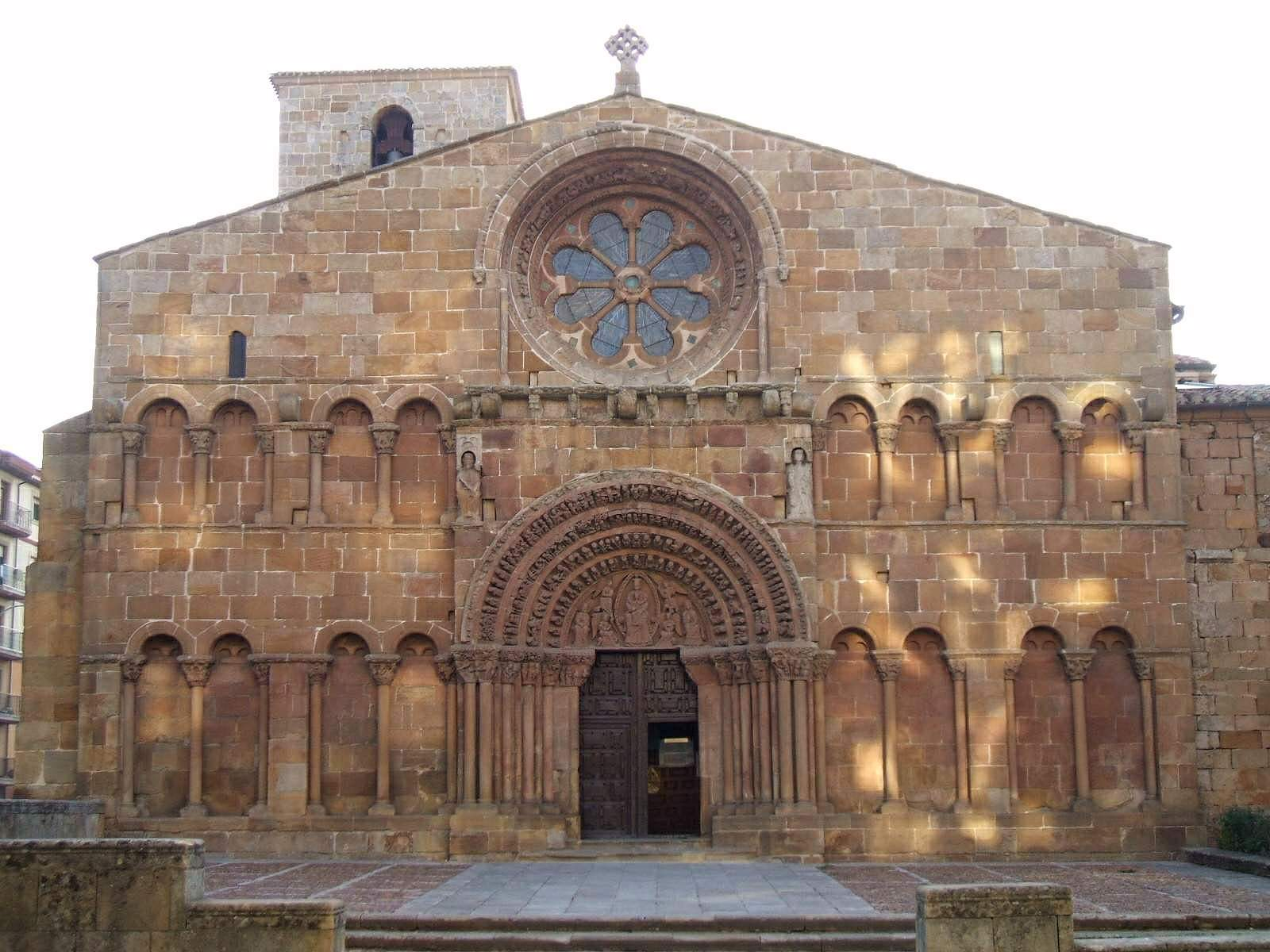
Santo Domingo (Soria).

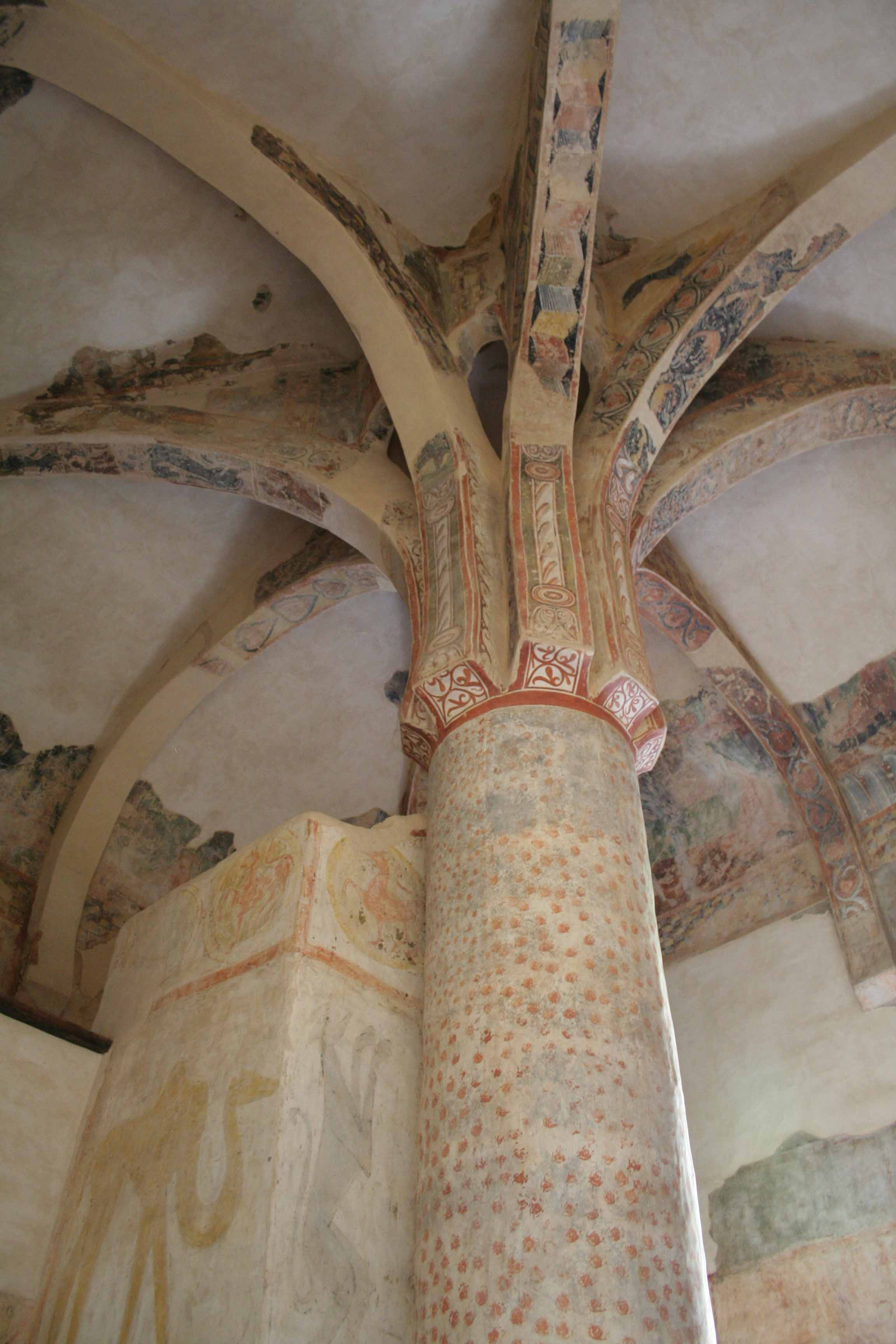
Central column of San Baudelio de Berlanga.

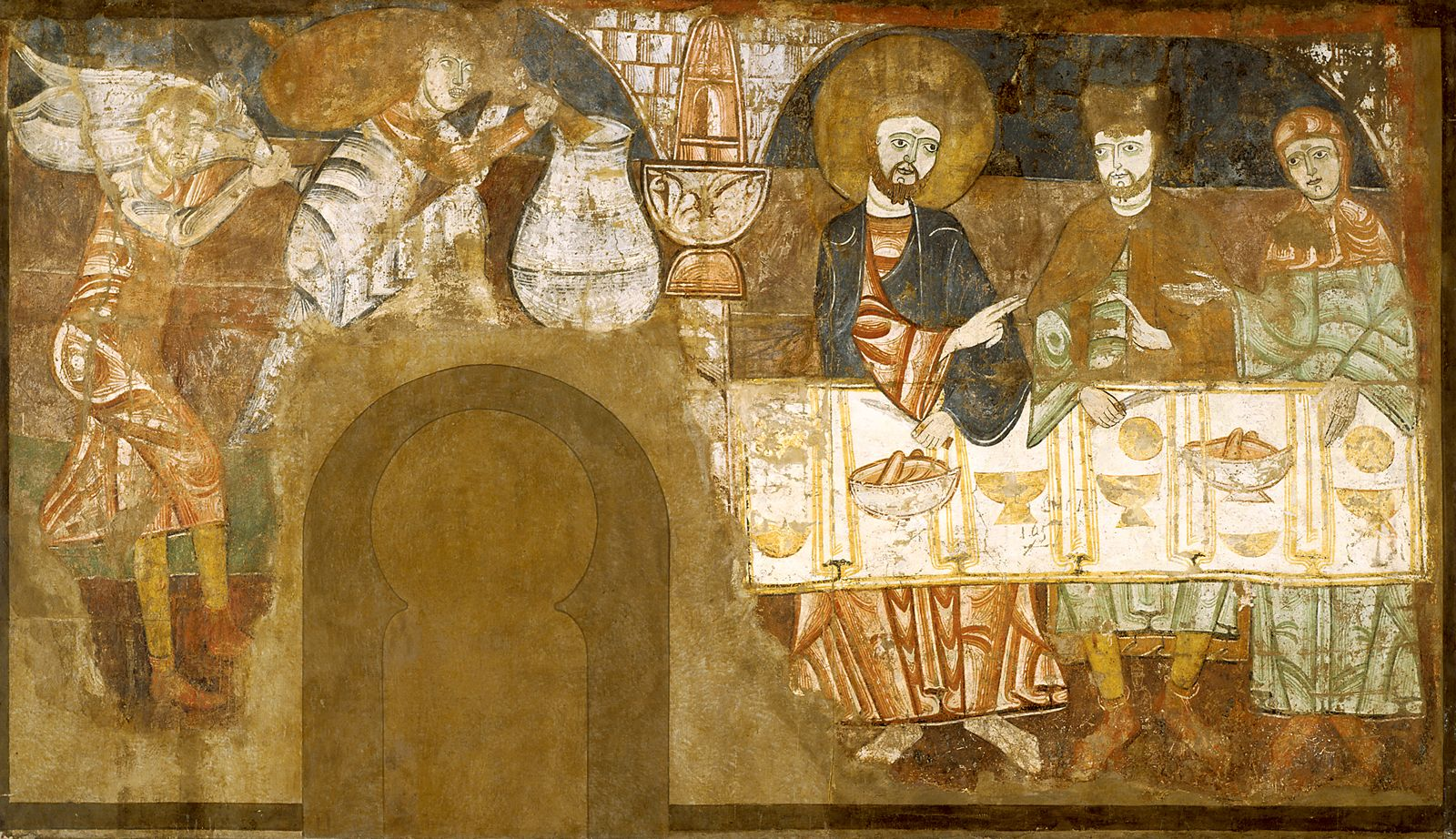
The Weddings at Cana, fresco of San Baudelio de Berlanga.

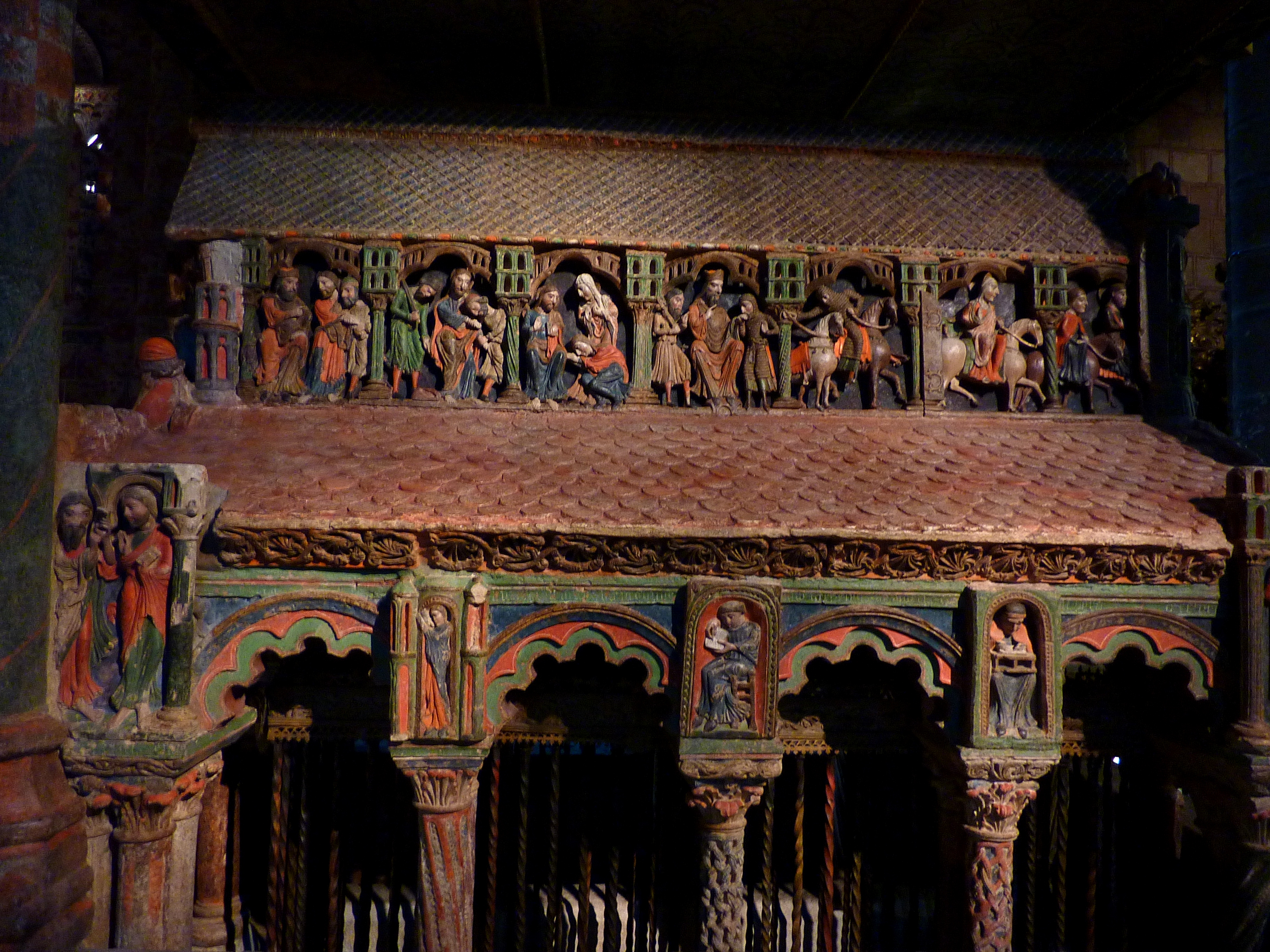
Tomb of the Holy Brothers Martyrs in the basilica of San Vicente (Ávila).

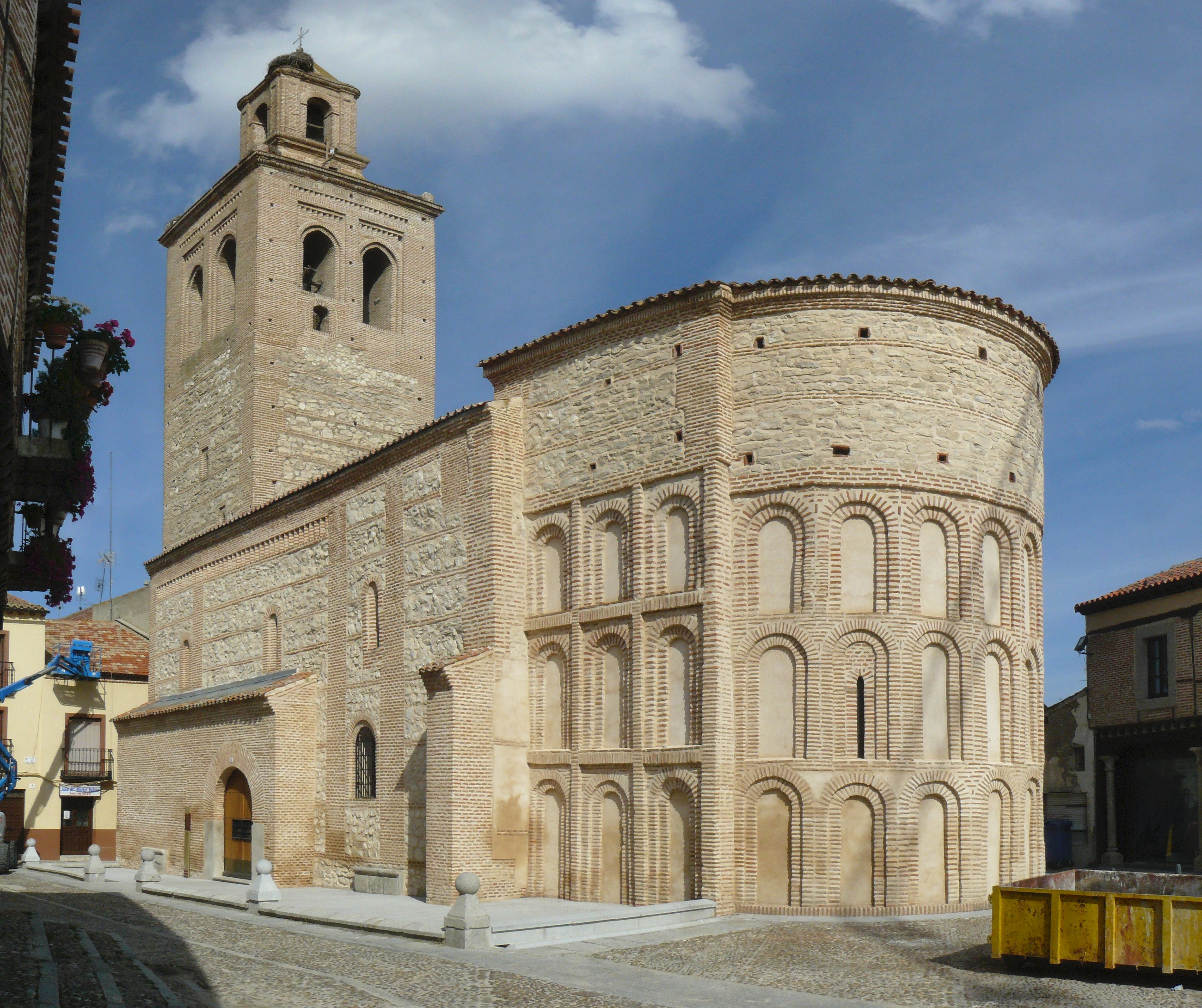
Santa María la Mayor of Arévalo (Romanesque-Mudéjar).

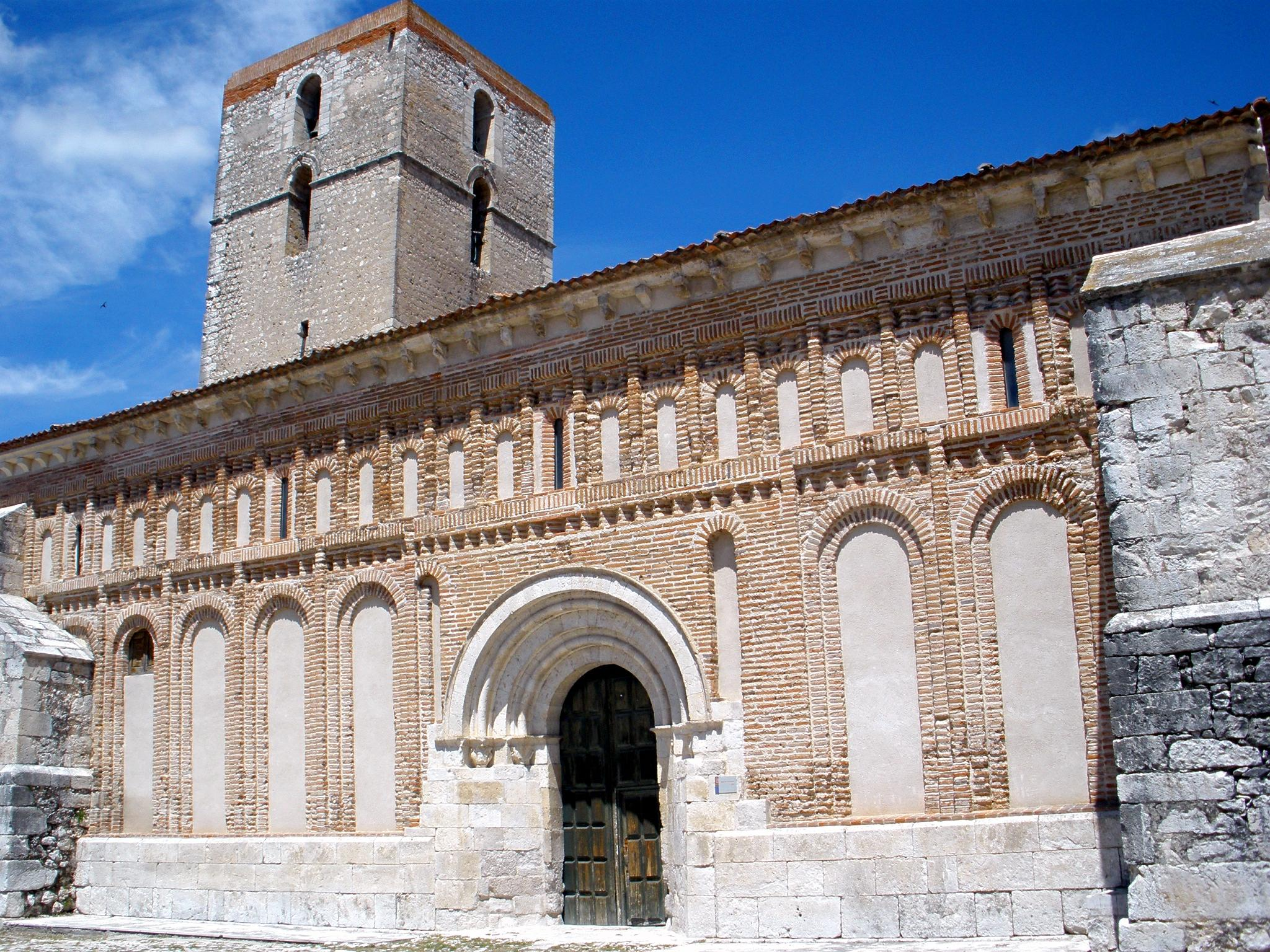
San Andrés de Cuéllar (Romanesque-Mudéjar).

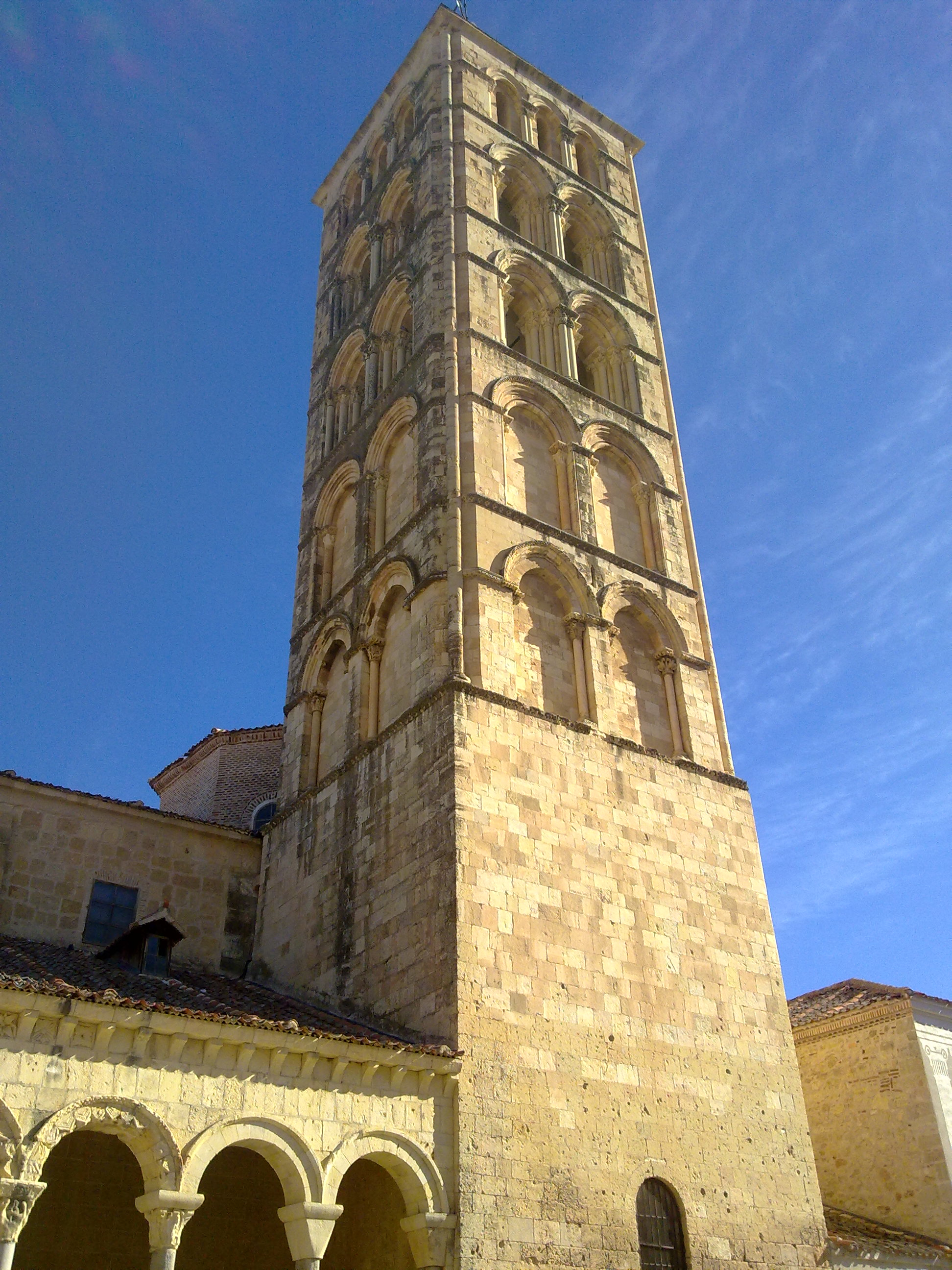
Tower and atrium of San Esteban (Segovia).

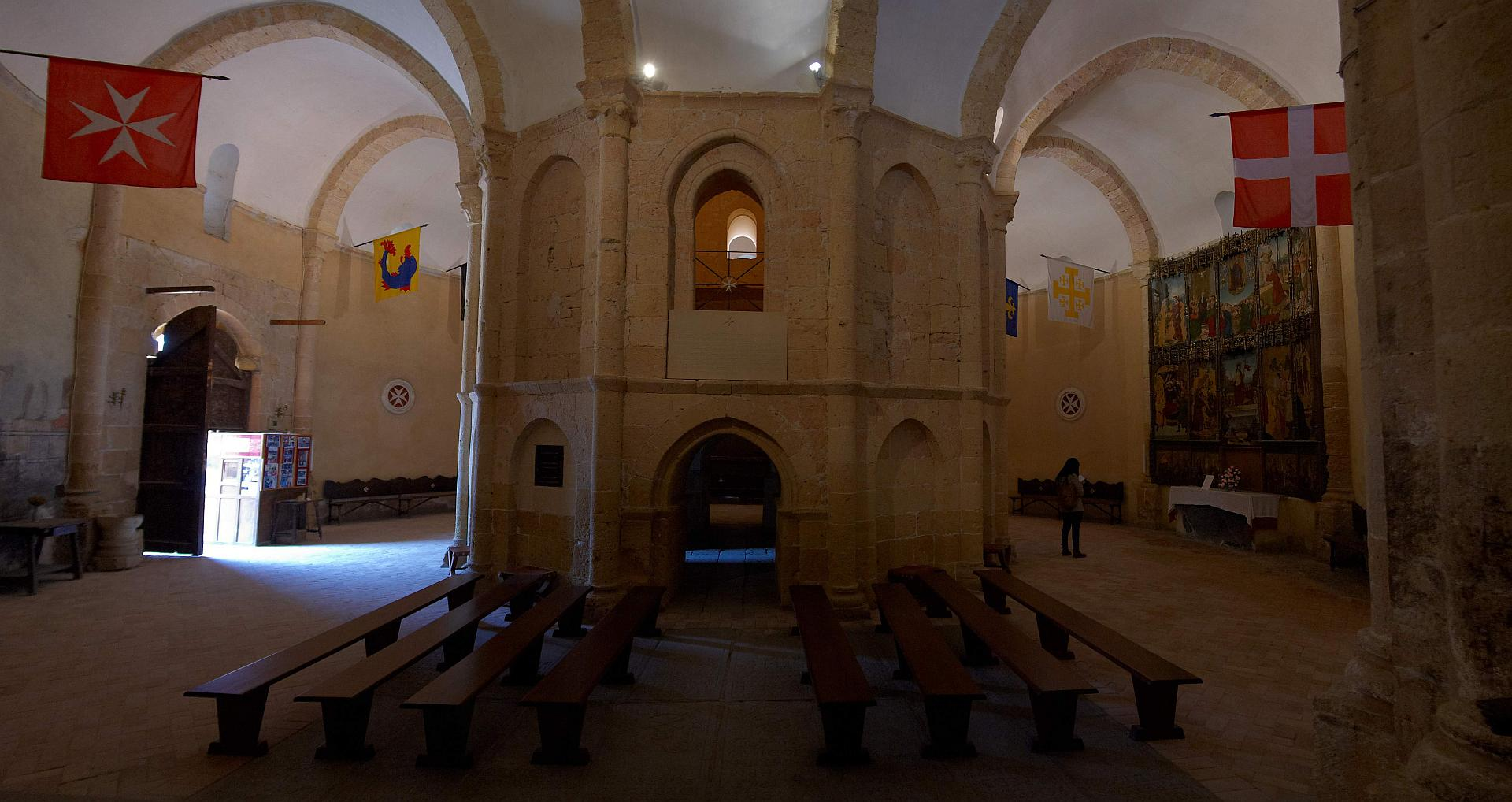
Interior of the Church of la Vera Cruz (Segovia).

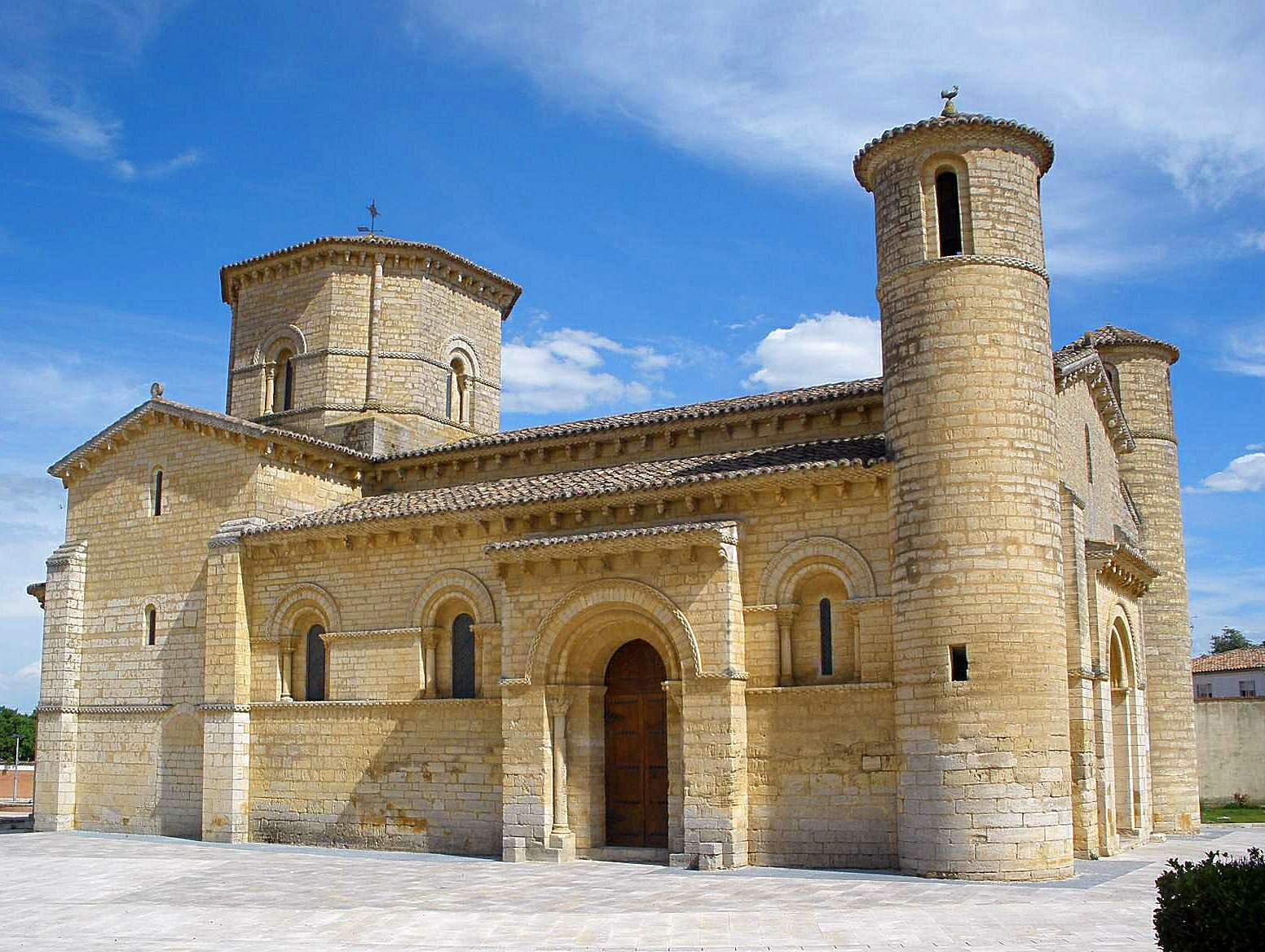
San Martín de Frómista.

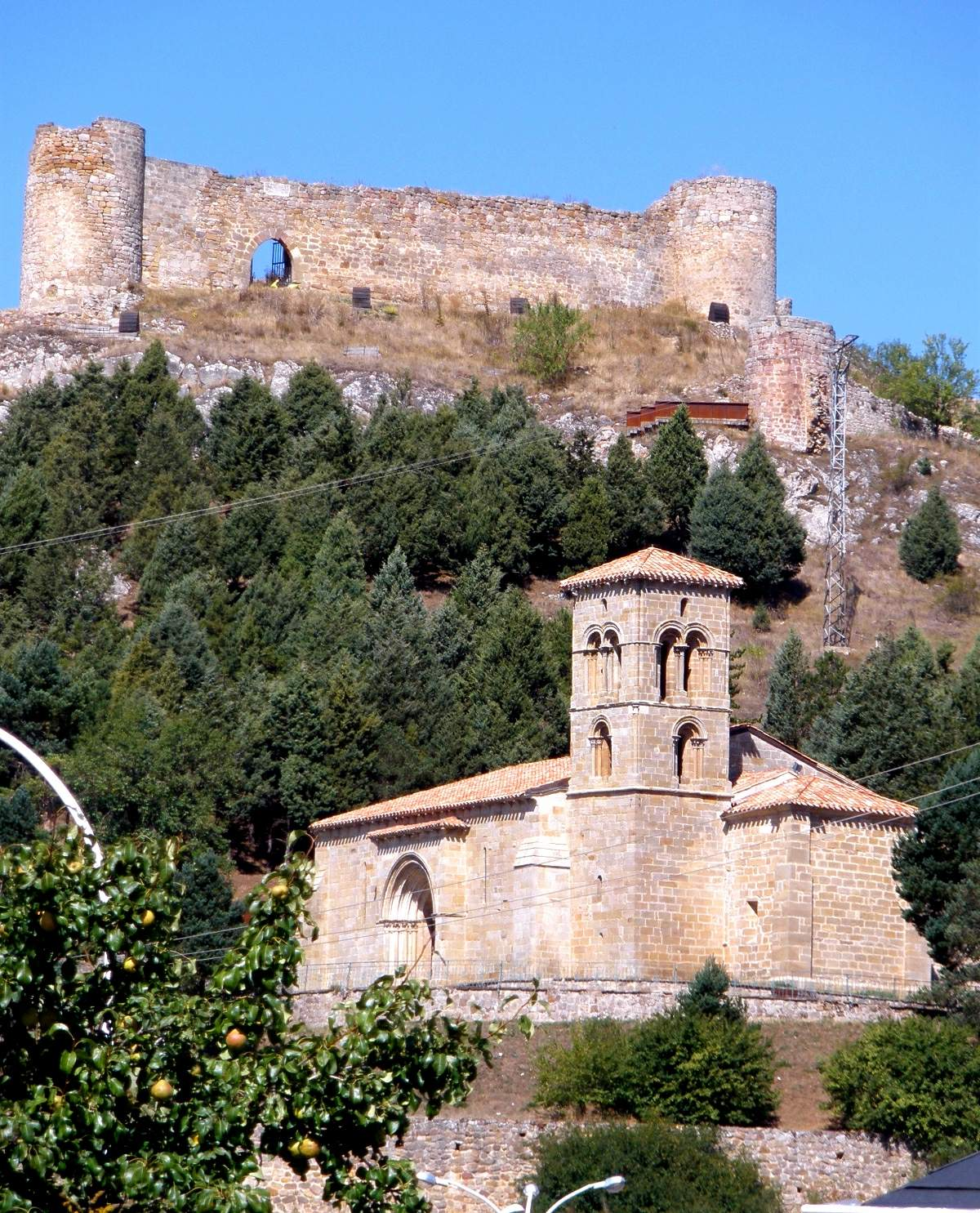
Ermita de Santa Cecilia and castle of Aguilar de Campoo.

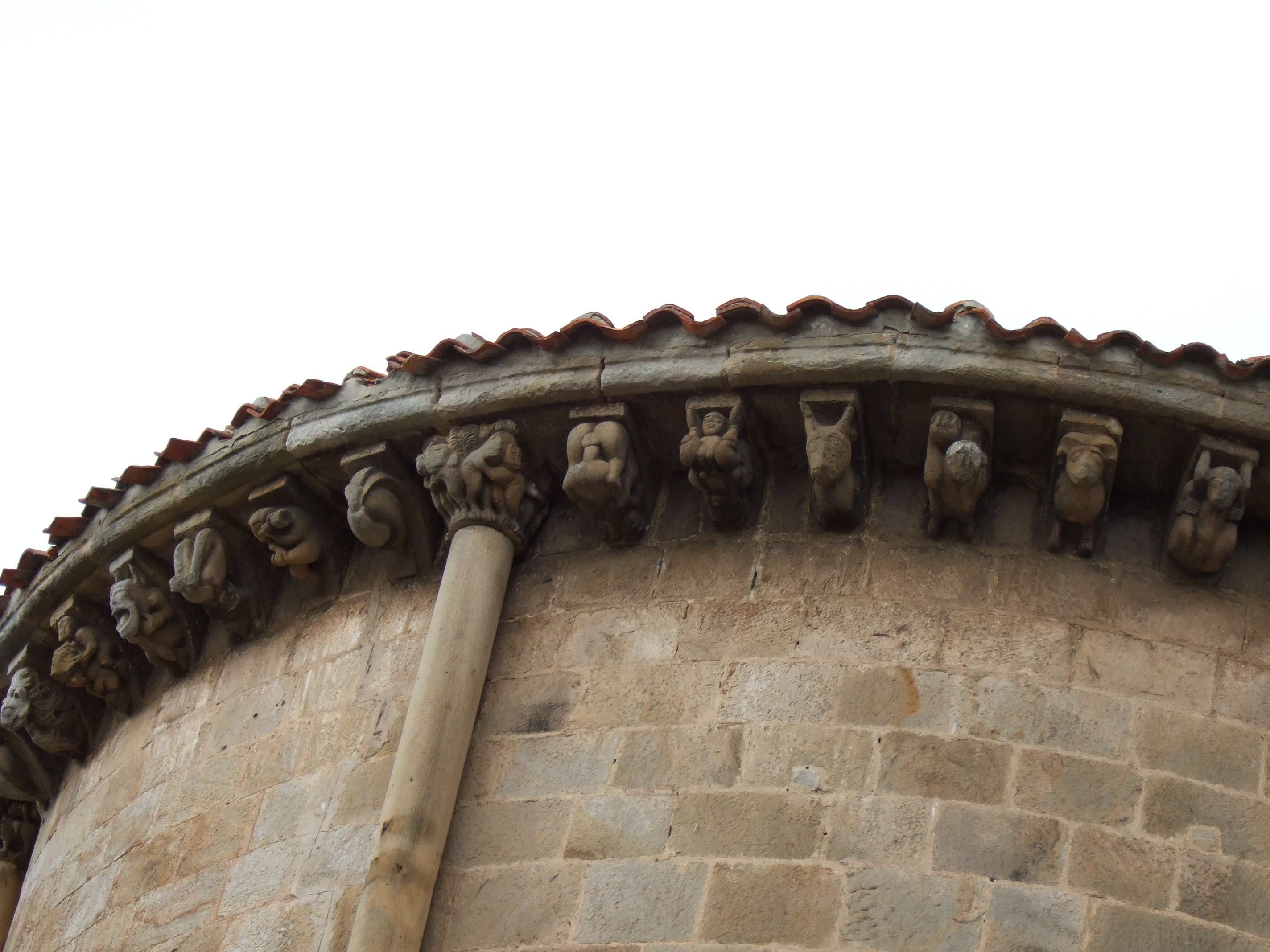
Corbels in the Collegiate of San Pedro de Cervatos.

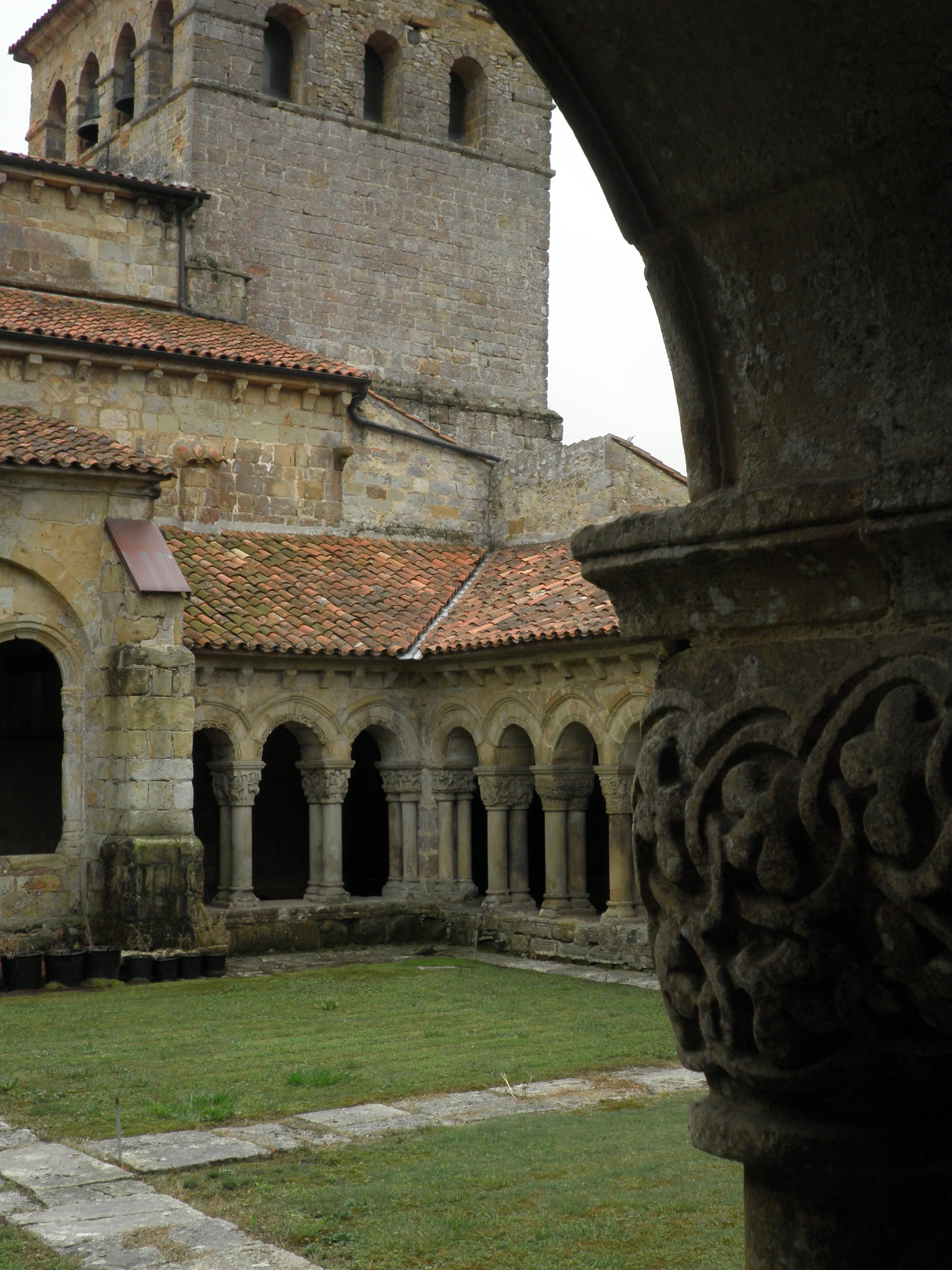
Cloister of the Collegiate church of Santa Juliana (Santillana del Mar).

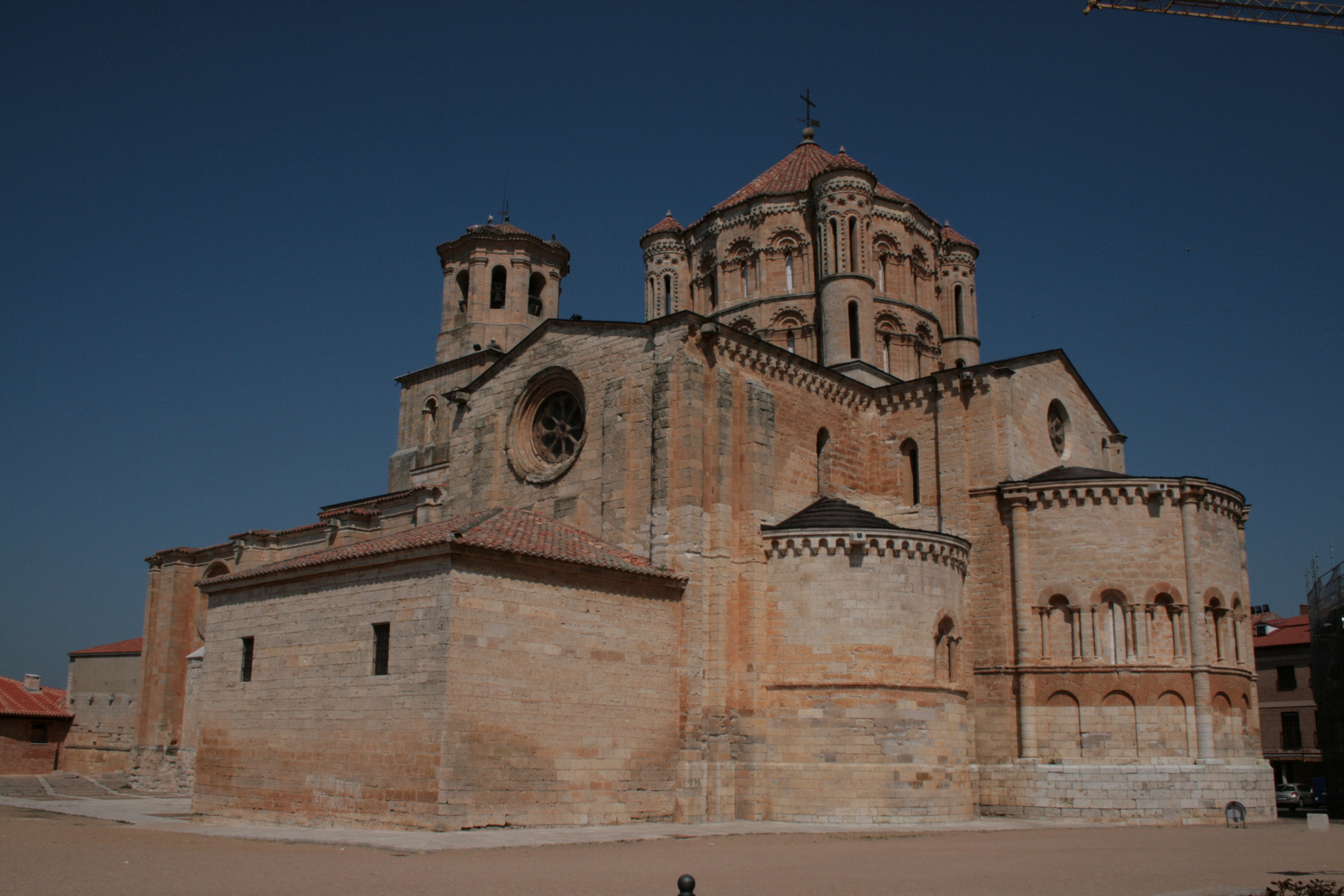
Colegiata de Santa María la Mayor (Toro).

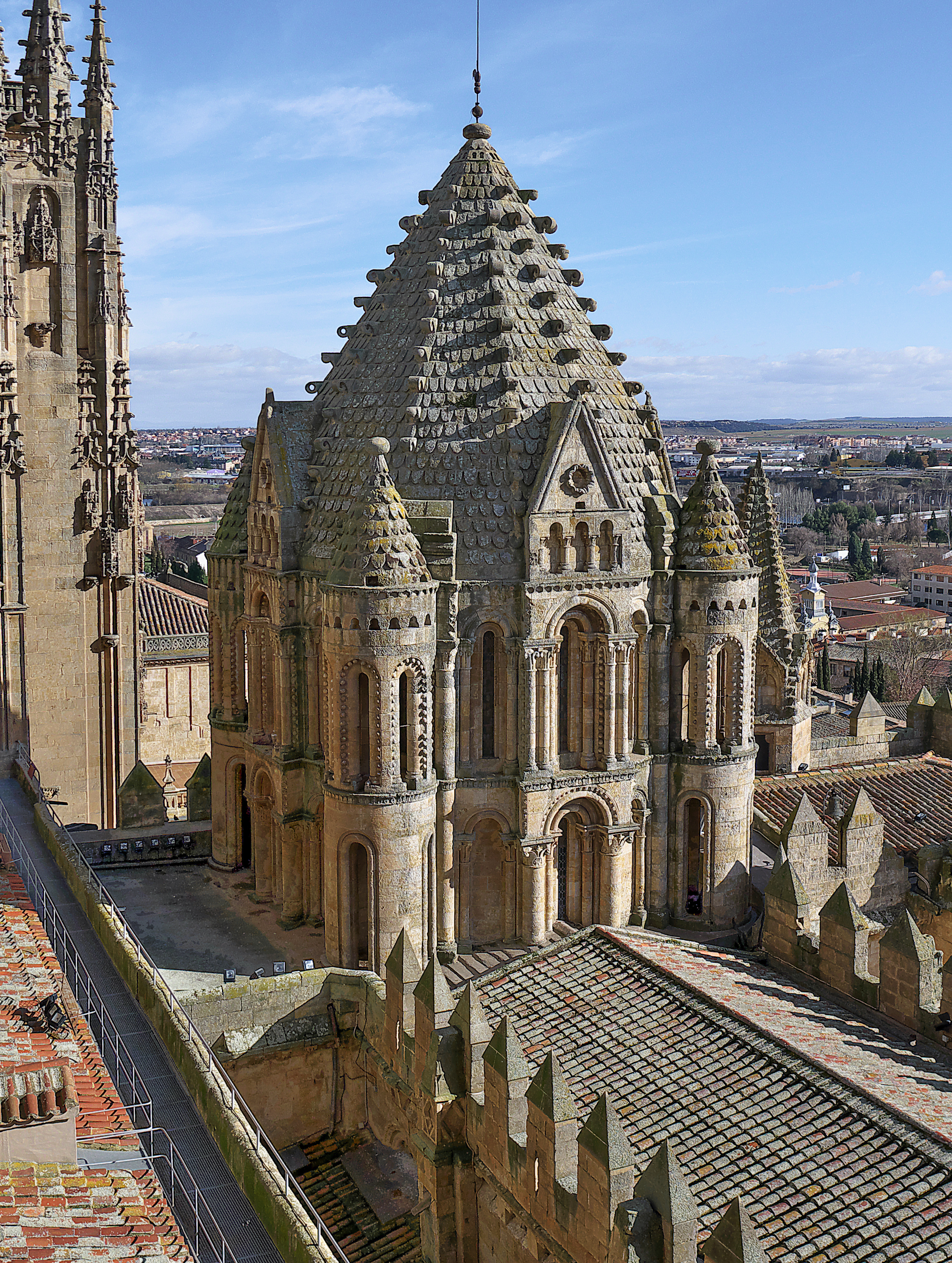
Dome of the Old Cathedral (Salamanca).

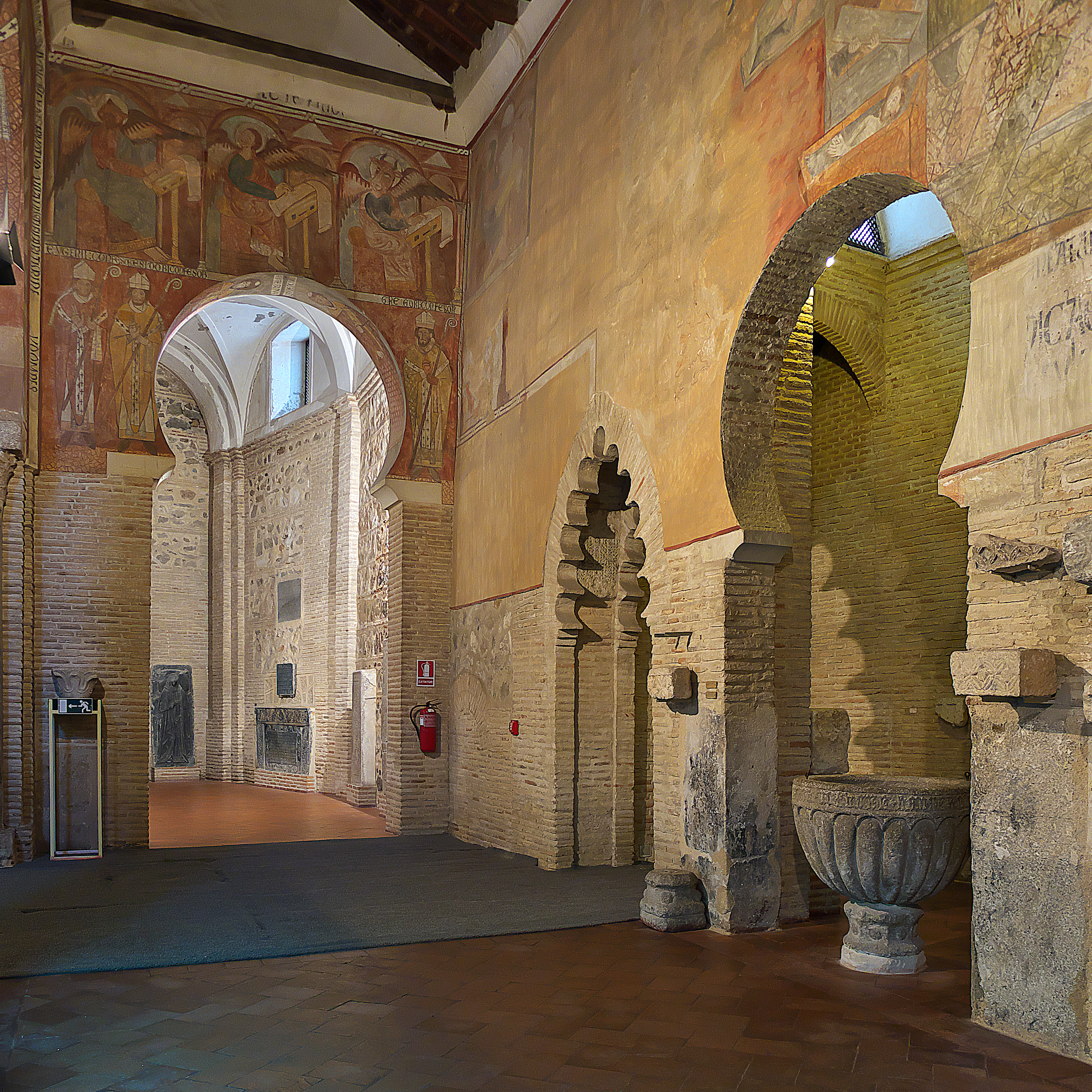
San Román (Toledo) (Romanesque-Mudéjar).

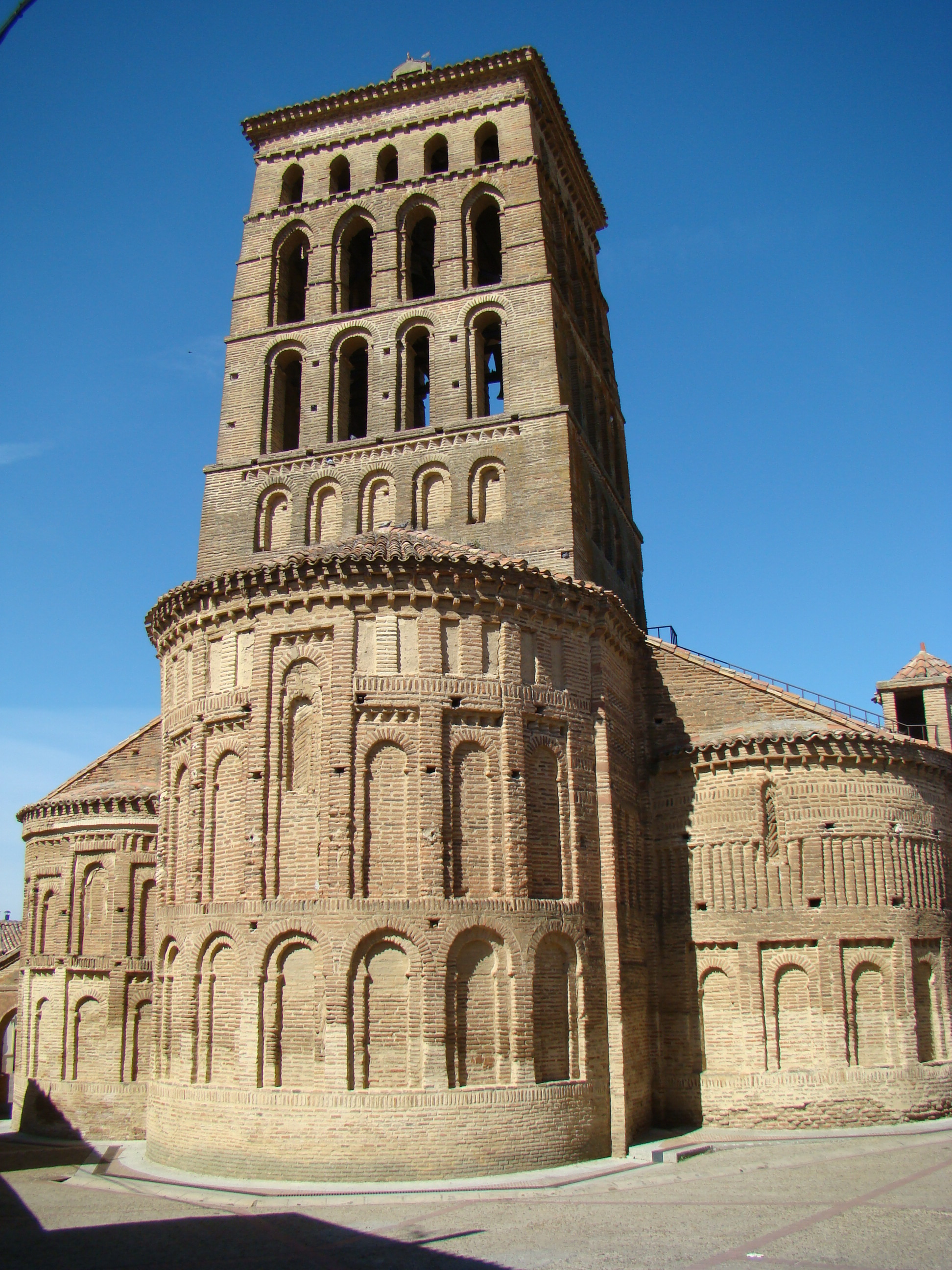
San Lorenzo (Sahagún) (Romanesque-Mudéjar).

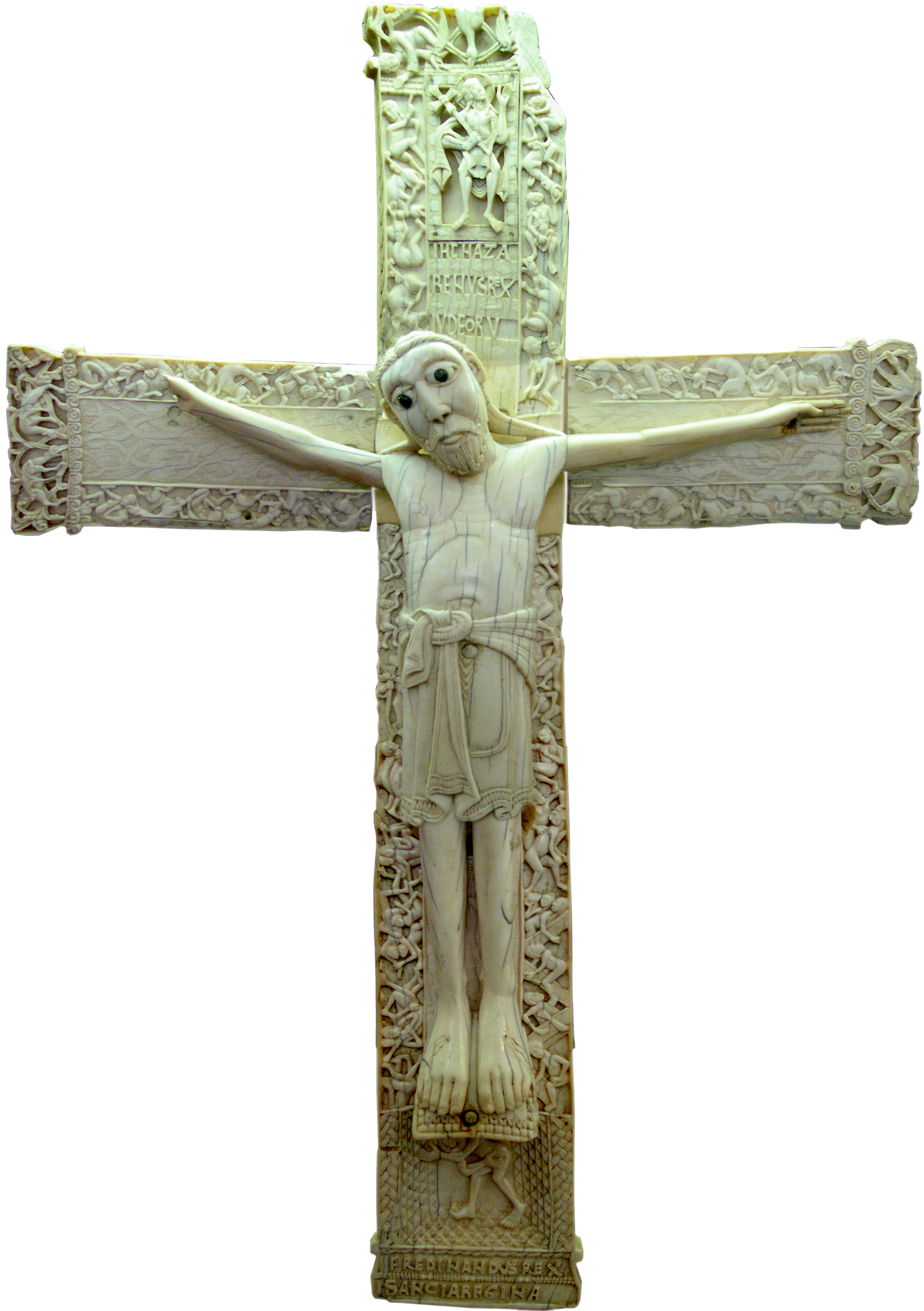
Crucifix of don Fernando and doña Sancha.

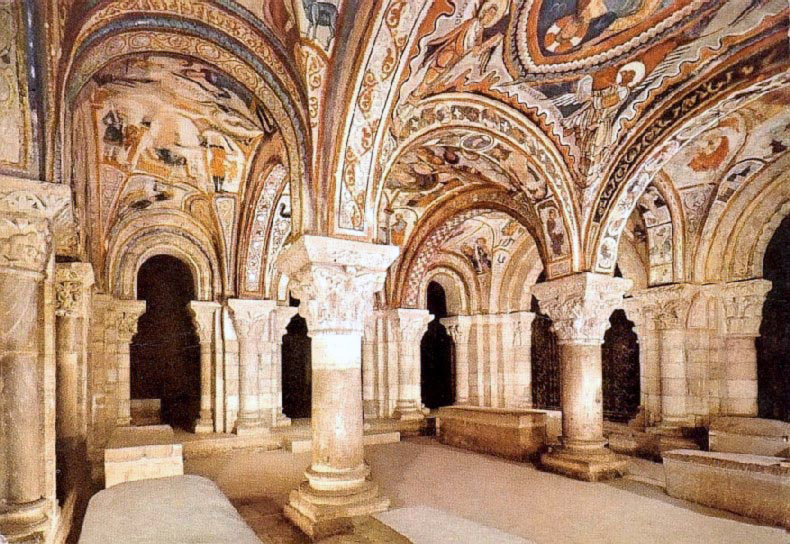
Royal Pantheon of San Isidoro (León).

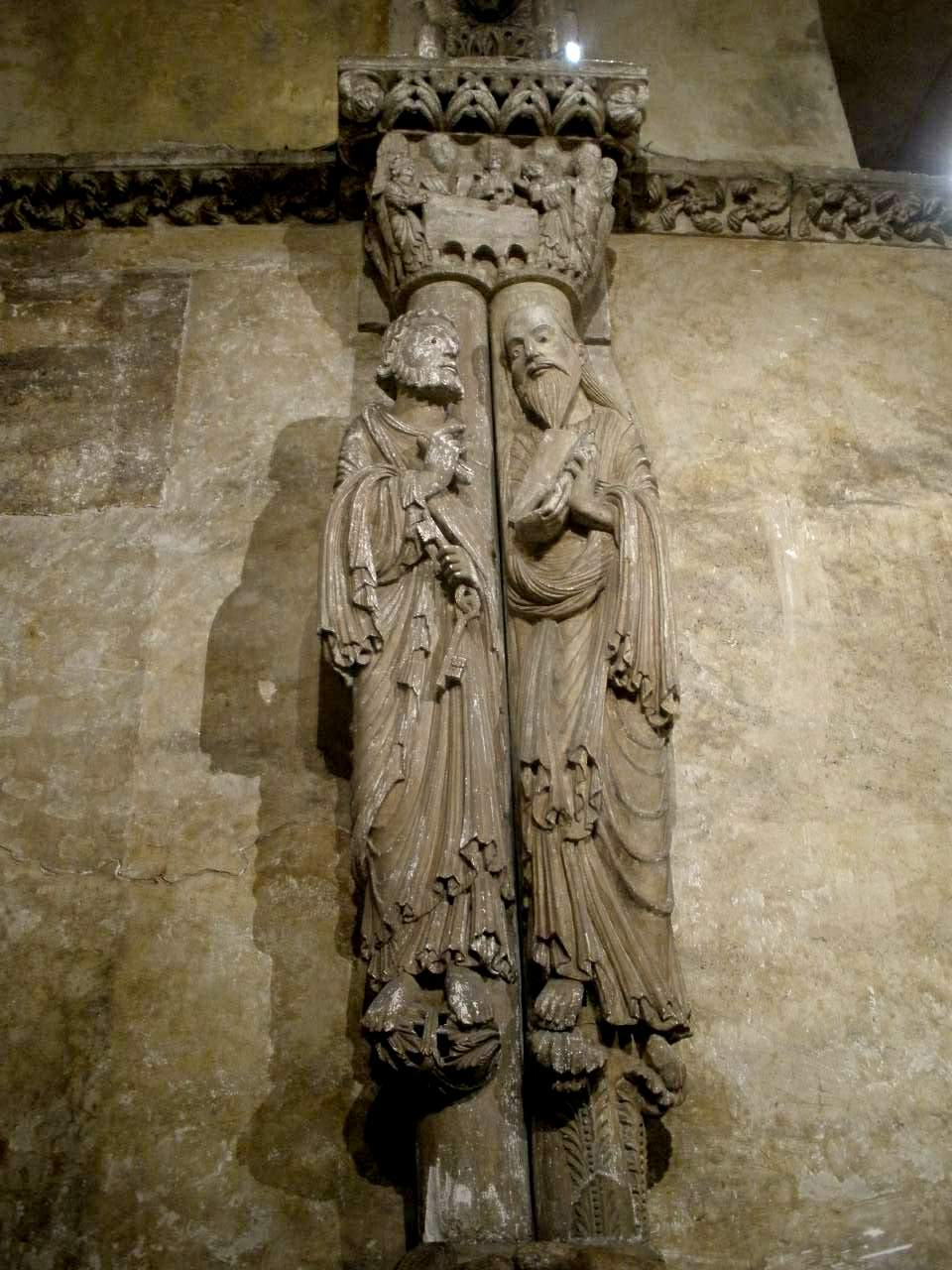
Two of the apostles of the Cámara Santa (Oviedo).

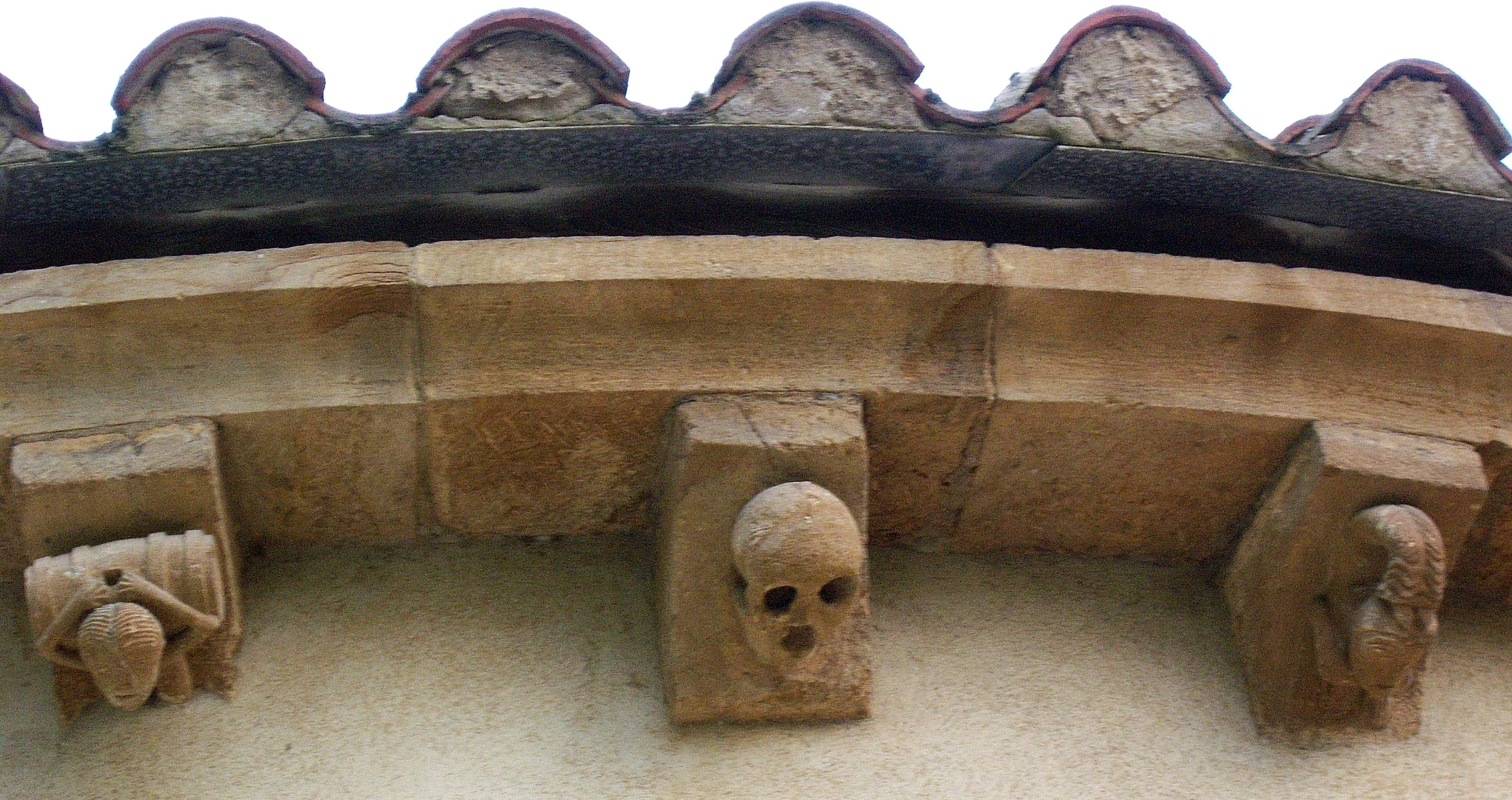
Corbels in San Martino de Villallana. -Church of San Martino de Villallana-

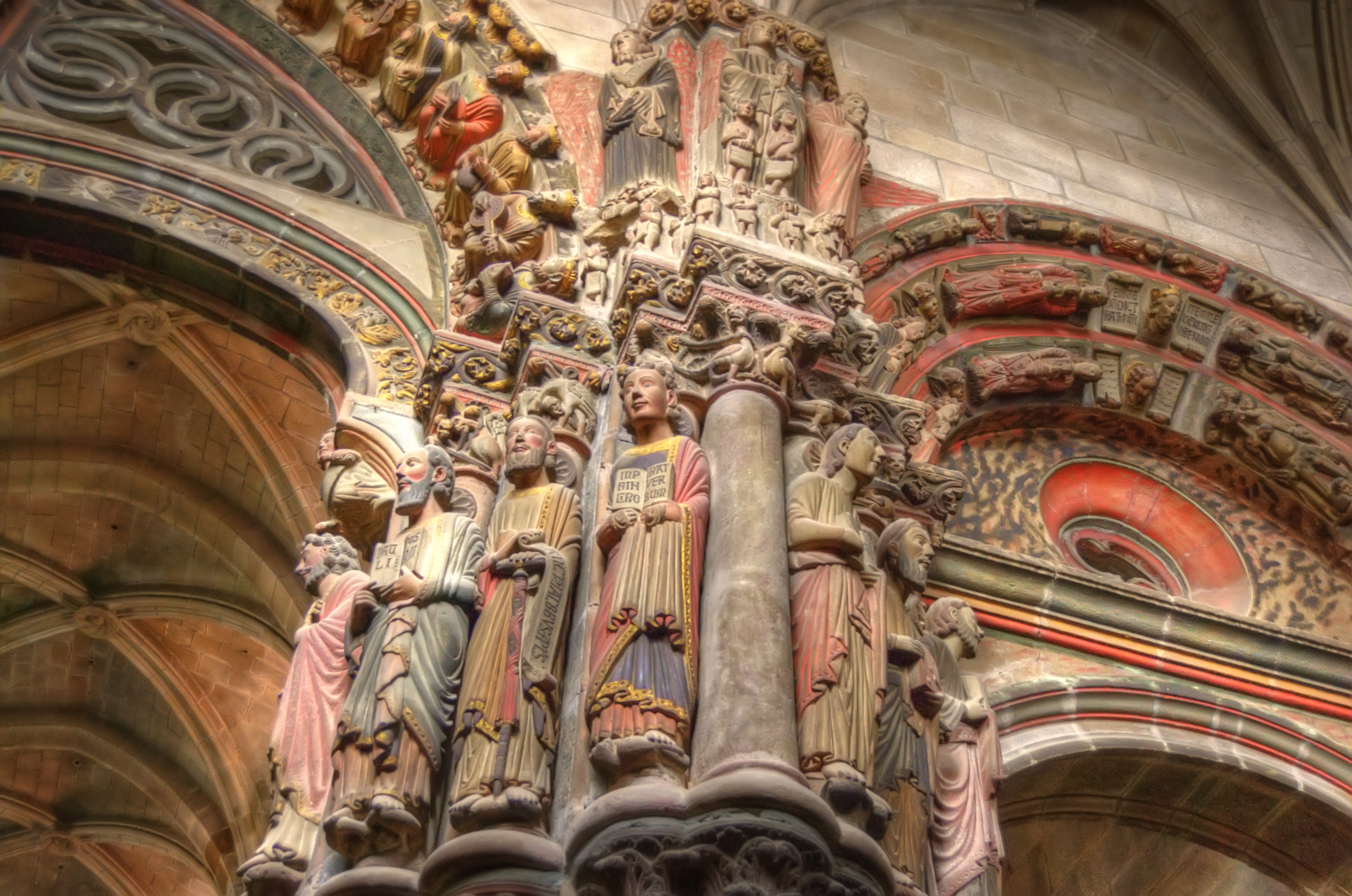
Portico of the Cathedral of Ourense.

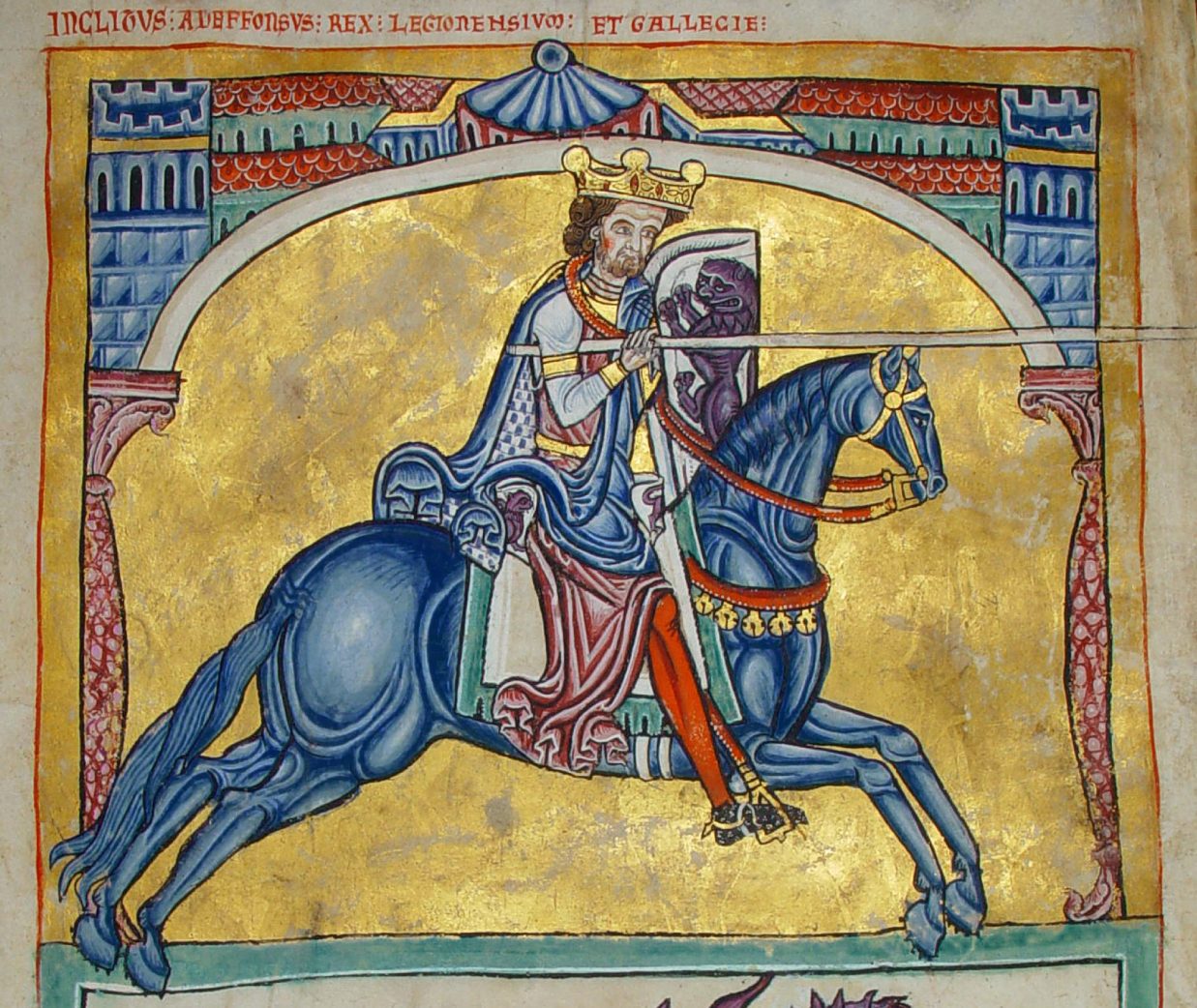
Alfonso IX of León, illustration of the Tumbo A. -Romanesque illuminated manuscripts-

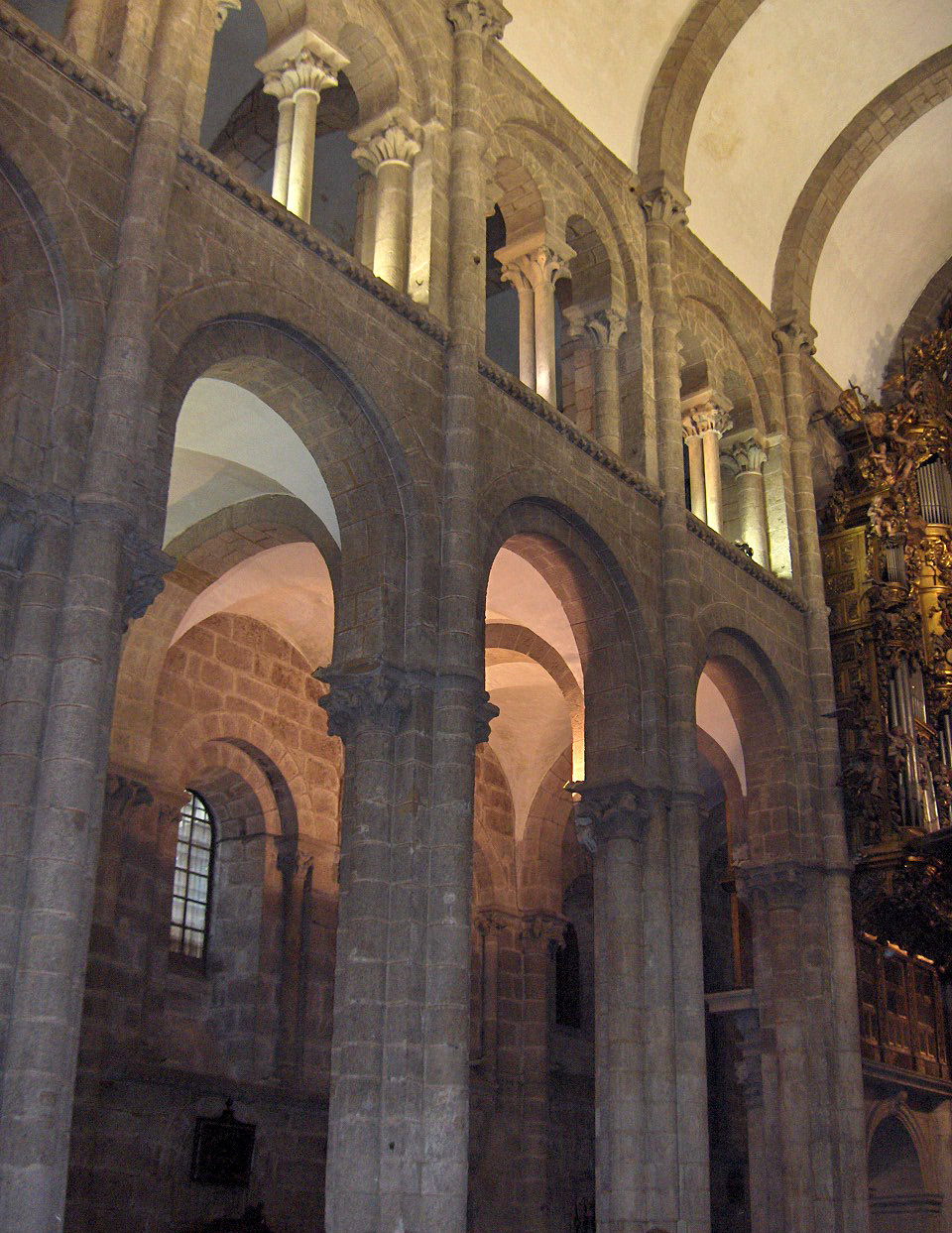
Vault, clerestory and arches of the central nave of the Cathedral of Santiago de Compostela.

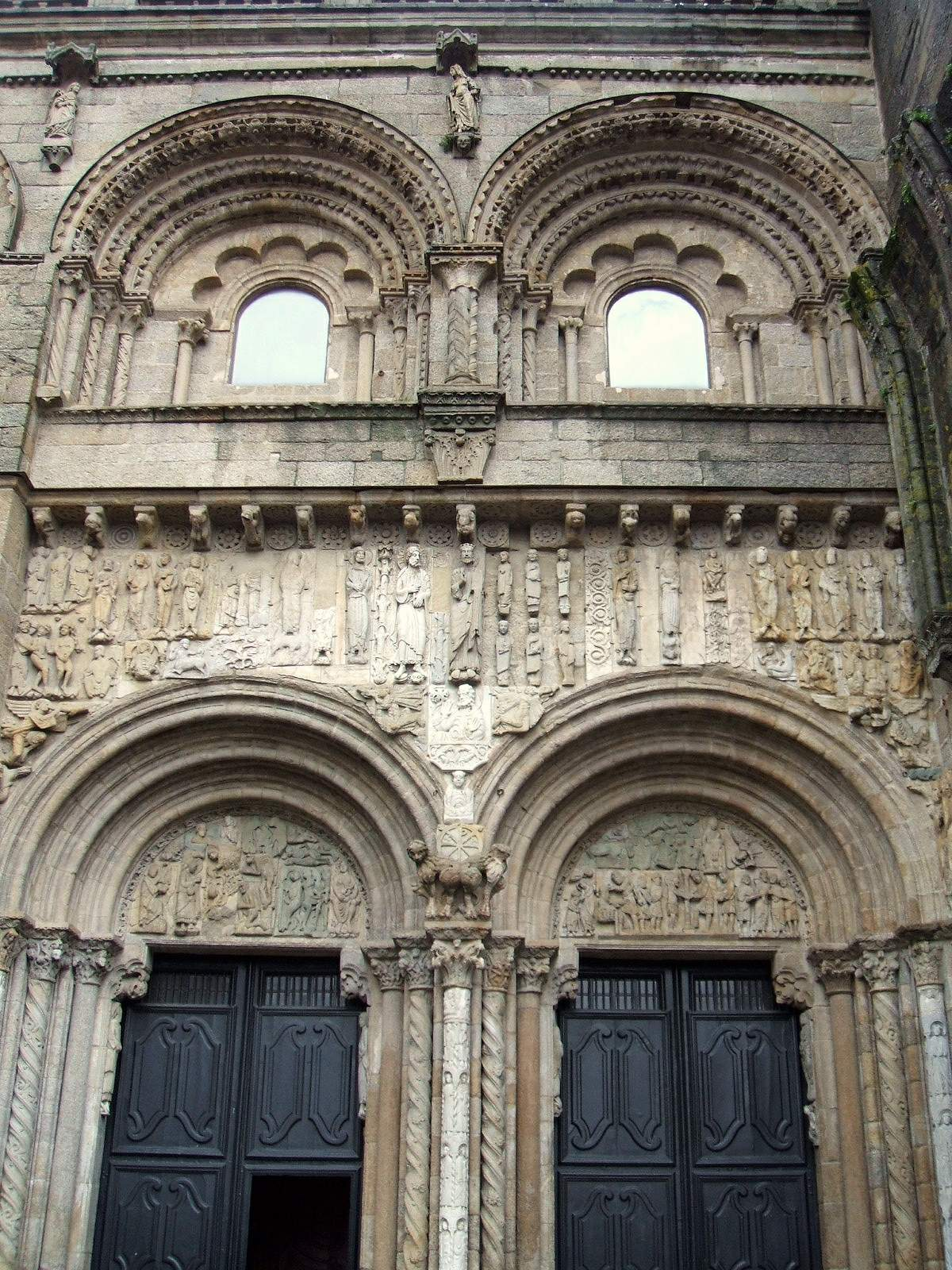
Facade of Pratarías of the Cathedral of Santiago de Compostela.

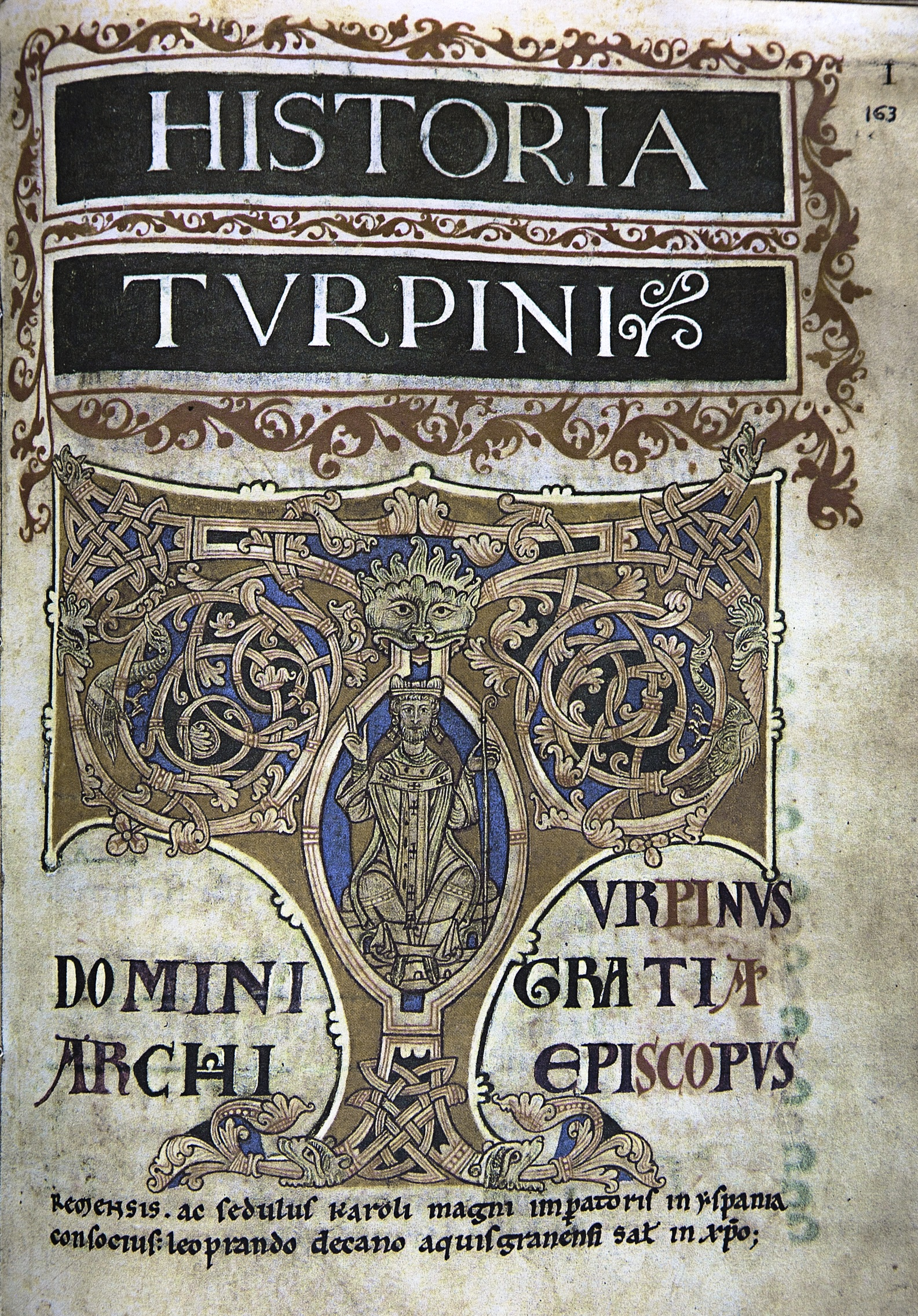
Codex Calixtinus, 1140.

== See also ==
- Romanesque architecture in Spain
- Catalan Romanesque Churches of the Vall de Boí
