= Saint Étienne (disambiguation) =

Saint-Étienne is a French city in the Loire department.

Saint Etienne may also refer to:

== People ==
- Saint Stephen, the first martyred saint
- Jean-Paul Rabaut Saint-Étienne, French revolutionary

== Places ==
=== Canada ===
- Saint-Étienne-de-Beauharnois, Quebec
- Saint-Étienne-de-Bolton, Quebec
- Saint-Étienne-des-Grès, Quebec
- Saint-Étienne-de-Lauzon, Quebec

=== France ===
- Arrondissement of Saint-Étienne, Loire department
- Saint-Étienne-à-Arnes, in the Ardennes department
- Saint-Étienne-au-Mont, in the Pas-de-Calais department
- Saint-Étienne-au-Temple, in the Marne department
- Saint-Étienne-aux-Clos, in the Corrèze department
- Saint-Étienne-Cantalès, in the Cantal department
- Saint-Étienne-d'Albagnan, in the Hérault department
- Saint-Étienne-de-Baïgorry, in the Pyrénées-Atlantiques department
- Saint-Étienne-de-Boulogne, in the Ardèche department
- Saint-Étienne-de-Brillouet, in the Vendée department
- Saint-Étienne-de-Carlat, in the Cantal department
- Saint-Étienne-de-Chigny, in the Indre-et-Loire department
- Saint-Étienne-de-Chomeil, in the Cantal department
- Saint-Étienne-de-Crossey, in the Isère department
- Saint-Étienne-de-Cuines, in the Savoie department
- Saint-Étienne-de-Fontbellon, in the Ardèche department
- Saint-Étienne-de-Fougères, in the Lot-et-Garonne department
- Saint-Étienne-de-Fursac, in the Creuse department
- Saint-Étienne-de-Gourgas, in the Hérault department
- Saint-Étienne-de-Lisse, in the Gironde department
- Saint-Étienne-de-l'Olm, in the Gard department
- Saint-Étienne-de-Lugdarès, in the Ardèche department
- Saint-Étienne-de-Maurs, in the Cantal department
- Saint-Étienne-de-Mer-Morte, in the Loire-Atlantique department
- Saint-Étienne-de-Montluc, in the Loire-Atlantique department
- Saint-Étienne-de-Puycorbier, in the Dordogne department
- Saint-Étienne-de-Saint-Geoirs, in the Isère department
- Saint-Étienne-des-Champs, in the Puy-de-Dôme department
- Saint-Étienne-de-Serre, in the Ardèche department
- Saint-Étienne-des-Guérets, in the Loir-et-Cher department
- Saint-Étienne-des-Oullières, in the Rhône department
- Saint-Étienne-des-Sorts, in the Gard department
- Saint-Étienne-de-Tinée, in the Alpes-Maritimes department
- Saint-Étienne-de-Tulmont, in the Tarn-et-Garonne department
- Saint-Étienne-de-Valoux, in the Ardèche department
- Saint-Étienne-de-Vicq, in the Allier department
- Saint-Étienne-de-Villeréal, in the Lot-et-Garonne department
- Saint-Étienne-d'Orthe, in the Landes department
- Saint-Étienne-du-Bois, Ain, in the Ain department
- Saint-Étienne-du-Bois, Vendée, in the Vendée department
- Saint-Étienne-du-Grès, in the Bouches-du-Rhône department
- Saint-Étienne-du-Gué-de-l'Isle, in the Côtes-d'Armor department
- Saint-Étienne-du-Rouvray, in the Seine-Maritime department
- Saint-Étienne-du-Valdonnez, in the Lozère department
- Saint-Étienne-du-Vauvray, in the Eure department
- Saint-Étienne-du-Vigan, in the Haute-Loire department
- Saint-Étienne-en-Bresse, in the Saône-et-Loire department
- Saint-Étienne-en-Coglès, in the Ille-et-Vilaine department
- Saint-Étienne-en-Dévoluy, in the Hautes-Alpes department
- Saint-Étienne-Estréchoux, in the Hérault department
- Saint-Étienne-la-Cigogne, in the Deux-Sèvres department
- Saint-Étienne-la-Geneste, in the Corrèze department
- Saint-Étienne-l'Allier, in the Eure department
- Saint-Étienne-Lardeyrol, in the Haute-Loire department
- Saint-Étienne-la-Thillaye, in the Calvados department
- Saint-Étienne-la-Varenne, in the Rhône department
- Saint-Étienne-le-Laus, in the Hautes-Alpes department
- Saint-Étienne-le-Molard, in the Loire department
- Saint-Étienne-les-Orgues, in the Alpes-de-Haute-Provence department
- Saint-Étienne-lès-Remiremont, in the Vosges department
- Saint-Étienne-Roilaye, in the Oise department
- Saint-Étienne-sous-Bailleul, in the Eure department
- Saint-Étienne-sous-Barbuise, in the Aube department
- Saint-Étienne-sur-Blesle, in the Haute-Loire department
- Saint-Étienne-sur-Chalaronne, in the Ain department
- Saint-Étienne-sur-Reyssouze, in the Ain department
- Saint-Étienne-sur-Suippe, in the Marne department
- Saint-Étienne-sur-Usson, in the Puy-de-Dôme department
- Saint-Étienne-Vallée-Française, in the Lozère department

=== Rivers ===
- Rivière du Mont Saint-Étienne, Quebec, Canada
- Saint-Étienne River (Saguenay River tributary), Quebec, Canada
- Rivière Saint-Étienne (Réunion)

=== Places of worship ===
==== Cathedrals ====
- Saint-Étienne Cathedral, in Saint-Étienne
- Agde Cathedral (Cathédrale Saint-Étienne d'Agde)
- Auxerre Cathedral (Cathédrale Saint-Étienne d'Auxerre)
- Cathedral of Saint Étienne, Paris
- Châlons Cathedral (Cathédrale Saint-Étienne de Châlons)
- Limoges Cathedral (Cathédrale Saint-Étienne de Limoges)
- Saint-Brieuc Cathedral (Basilique-Cathédrale Saint-Étienne de Saint-Brieuc)
- St. Stephen's Greek Orthodox Cathedral, Paris
- St. Stephen's Basilica, Jerusalem, also known by its French name Saint-Étienne

==== Churches ====
- Saint-Étienne-du-Mont, in Paris
- Saint-Étienne-des-Grès, Paris
- Saint-Étienne Church (Beauvais)
- Saint-Étienne Church (Entrammes)
- Saint-Étienne, Uzès
- Abbey of Saint-Étienne, Caen
- Church of Saint-Étienne, Lille
- Church of Saint-Étienne, Vignory
- Church of Saint-Étienne-le-Vieux, Caen
- Collegiate Church of Saint-Étienne (Troyes)
- Collegiate Church of Saint-Étienne (Hombourg-Haut)
- Église Saint-Martin, Marmoutier, or Abbatiale Saint-Étienne
- Église Saint-Étienne de Boofzheim
- Église Saint-Étienne de Rosheim
- Église Saint-Étienne de Seltz
- Reformed Church of Saint-Étienne, Moudon
- Saint Stephen's Church, Strasbourg
- Temple Saint-Étienne, in Mulhouse

== Other uses ==
- Saint Etienne (band), an English indie dance band
- AS Saint-Étienne, a French football team
- "St. Etienne", a song by Frank Zappa from the 1986 album Jazz from Hell
- St. Étienne Mle 1907, a French machine gun used in World War I

== See also ==
- Étienne (disambiguation)
- St. Stephen (disambiguation)
