= Sankt Stefan =

Sankt Stefan may refer to:

== Localities ==
Austria

- Sankt Stefan am Walde, Upper Austria
- Sankt Stefan im Gailtal, Carinthia
- Sankt Stefan im Rosental, Styria
- Sankt Stefan ob Leoben, Styria
- Sankt Stefan ob Stainz, Styria

Switzerland

- St. Stephan, Switzerland, Canton of Bern, Switzerland

== Churches ==
- St. Štefan Kráľ's Church, Žilina, Slovakia
- St. Stefan's Romanian Orthodox Church, South St. Paul, Minnesota, US

== See also ==
- St. Stephen (disambiguation)
- St. Stephens (disambiguation)
- St. Stephen's Cathedral (disambiguation)
- St. Stephen's Church (disambiguation)
- San Esteban (disambiguation)
- Saint Etienne (disambiguation)
