= Church of San Esteban =

Church of San Esteban may refer to:

- Church of San Esteban (Ábalos)
- Church of San Esteban (Ciaño)
- Church of San Esteban (Fresno del Torote)
- Church of San Esteban (Murillo de Río Leza)
- Church of San Esteban (Segovia)
- Church of San Esteban (Valencia)

== See also ==
- Church of San Esteban de Aramil, a church in Asturias, Spain
