= San Esteban =

San Esteban may refer to:

== Places ==
- San Esteban, Chile
- San Esteban, Olancho, Honduras
- San Esteban Island, Sonora, Mexico
- San Esteban, a barangay in Nabua, Camarines Sur, Philippines
- San Esteban, Ilocos Sur, Philippines
- San Esteban (Morcín), Asturias, Spain
- San Esteban National Park, Venezuela
- Gulf of San Esteban, Western Patagonia

== Buildings ==
- San Esteban, Burgos, a former Catholic church, now museum, in Spain
- San Esteban, San Salvador, a historic Roman Catholic church in El Salvador
- Church of San Esteban (disambiguation)
- Al-Andalusian palatial complex and neighborhood of San Esteban, a Moorish archaeological site in Murcia, Spain

== Ships ==
- San Esteban (1554 shipwreck), a Spanish cargo ship wrecked off the coast of what is now Texas
- San Esteban (1588 shipwreck), a ship of the Spanish Armada wrecked on the west coast of Ireland
- San Esteban (1607 shipwreck), a Spanish galleon wrecked on the coast of France
- San Esteban Apedreado, a Spanish fifth rate frigate launched in 1726 and broken up in 1744

== See also ==
- St. Stephen (disambiguation)
