= St. Stephens =

St. Stephens, St. Stephen's, Saint Stephens, or Saint Stephen's may refer to the following:

== Population centers ==
- St. Stephens, Alabama, a town in the United States
- Saint Stephens, Nebraska, an unincorporated community
- St. Stephen's, Newfoundland and Labrador, Canada
- St. Stephens, North Carolina, a town in the United States
- Saint Stephens, Ohio, an unincorporated community
- St. Stephens, Wyoming, a town in the United States
- St. Stephens Church, Virginia, a town in the United States
- St Stephens by Launceston Rural, a civil parish in Cornwall, England
- St Stephen-in-Brannel, colloquially known as St. Stephens, a village in Cornwall, England
- St Stephens, three locations in England

== Education ==
- St. Stephen's College (disambiguation), a number of colleges
- St. Stephen's School (disambiguation), a number of schools
- St. Stephen's University in New Brunswick, Canada

== Places of worship ==
- St Stephen's Chapel, a chapel in the old Palace of Westminster, London, England
- St. Stephen's Church (disambiguation), a list of churches named after Saint Stephen
- St. Stephen's Cathedral (disambiguation), a list of churches named after Saint Stephen

== Other uses ==
- Saint Stephen's Day, a Christian saint's day celebrated on 26 or 27 December
- St Stephen's Green, a park in Dublin, Ireland
- St Stephen's Hull, a shopping centre in Kingston upon Hull, England

== See also ==
- St. Stephen (disambiguation)
