= Las Caldas Cave =

Cave and archaeological site in Spain

- Cueva de las Caldas
- Location in Spain Las Caldas Cave (Spain)
- 43°19′45″N 5°55′38″W
- Location: Nalón Valley
- Region: Asturias

Las Caldas Cave and the surrounding partial nature reserve (Reserva Natural Parcial de la Cueva de las Caldas) is a protected area covering 45 hectares within the Nalón Valley in the Municipality of Oviedo in the vicinity of the towns of La Piñera and Las Caldas.

The cave itself has a length of about 600 m and has three entrances. The main cavity is around 5 m high and contains a subterranean river. The cave has no particular geological significance but it is important for the wildlife and archaeological sites from the Solutrean and Magdalenian periods located there.

Bats living in the cave include the medium mouse-eared bat, cave bat, greater horseshoe bat, lesser horseshoe bat and Natterer's bat.

Archeological excavations in the cave have become one of the most important Upper Paleolithic sites in the Asturias region. Finds from the cave are of exceptional quality and include amongst others:

- the Venus of Las Caldas, a Magdalenian antler carving with an ibex's head and a woman's legs and genitals, that may be either a Venus figurine or decorated atlatl-type device
- paleolithic rock art
- two stylised overlapping female profiles on an engraved rod dating from the Middle Magdalenian.
- a stone plaque displaying a woman's stylised profile,
- a whale and 2 bisons engraved onto a sperm whale teeth,
- a high quality unused rock-crystal laurel leaf point,
- engraved horse teeth,
- a horse bone carved with bison heads.
