= Santo Estêvão =

Santo Estêvão may refer to:

== Places ==
Brazil

- Santo Estêvão, Bahia

India

- St Estevam, Goa

Portugal

- Santo Estêvão (Alenquer)
- Santo Estêvão (Lisbon)
- Santo Estêvão (Tavira)

== Other uses ==
- Doña Blanca, a wine grape

== See also ==
- St. Stephen (disambiguation)
