= Seltz =

- Commune
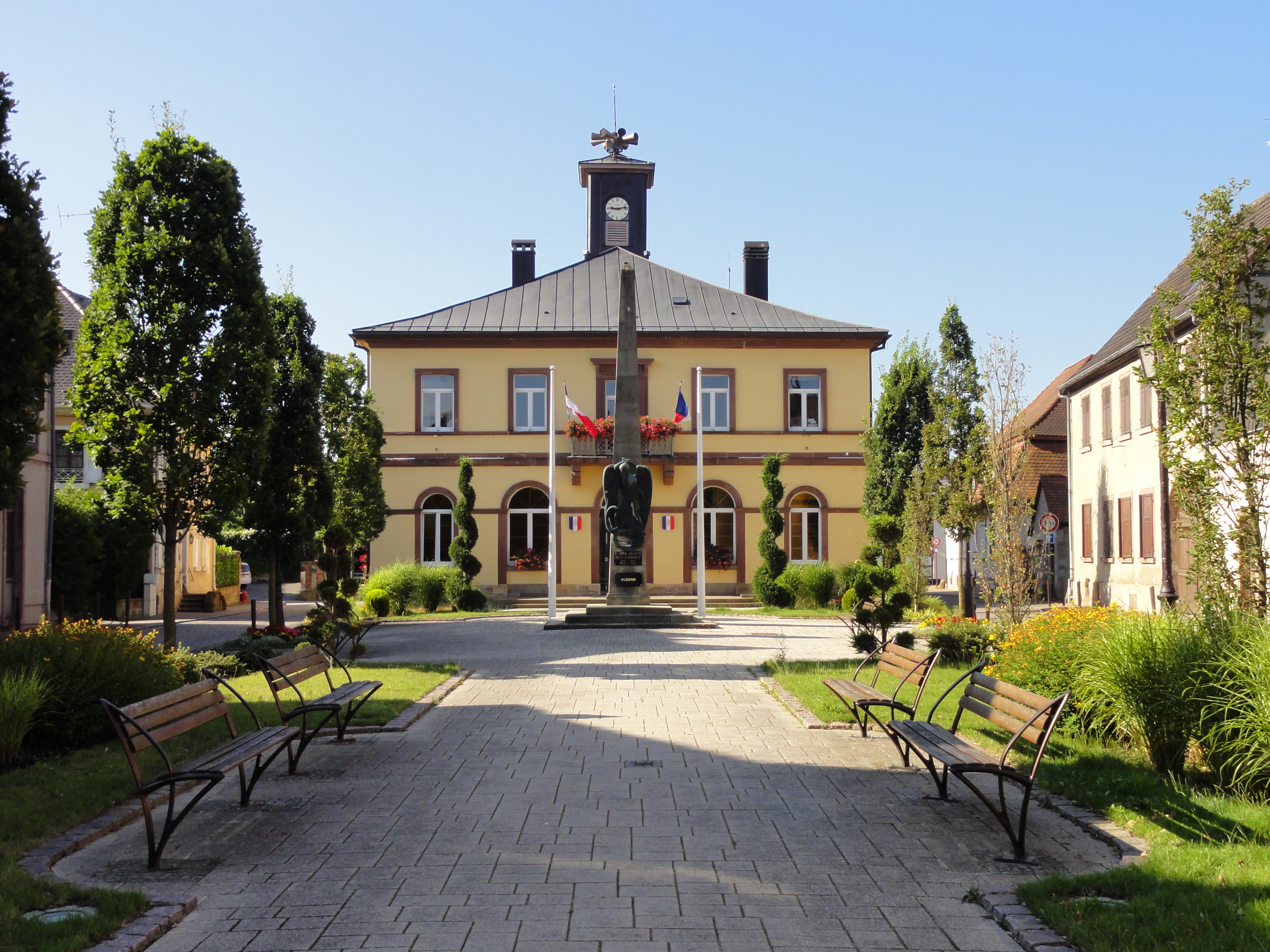
- The town hall in Seltz

- Coat of arms
- Location of Seltz
- Location within France Location within Grand Est
- Coordinates: 48°54′N 8°07′E
- Country: France
- Region: Grand Est
- Department: Bas-Rhin
- Arrondissement: Haguenau-Wissembourg
- Canton: Wissembourg

Government
  - Mayor (2020–2026): Jean-Luc Ball
- Area^{1}: 21 km^{2} (8.1 sq mi)
- Highest elevation: 165 m (541 ft)
- Lowest elevation: 107 m (351 ft)
- Population (2023): 3,204
  - Density: 150/km^{2} (400/sq mi)
- Time zone: UTC+01:00 (CET)
  - Summer (DST): UTC+02:00 (CEST)
- INSEE/Postal code: 67463 /67470
- ^{1} French Land Register data, which excludes lakes, ponds, glaciers > 1 km^{2} (0.386 sq mi or 247 acres) and river estuaries.

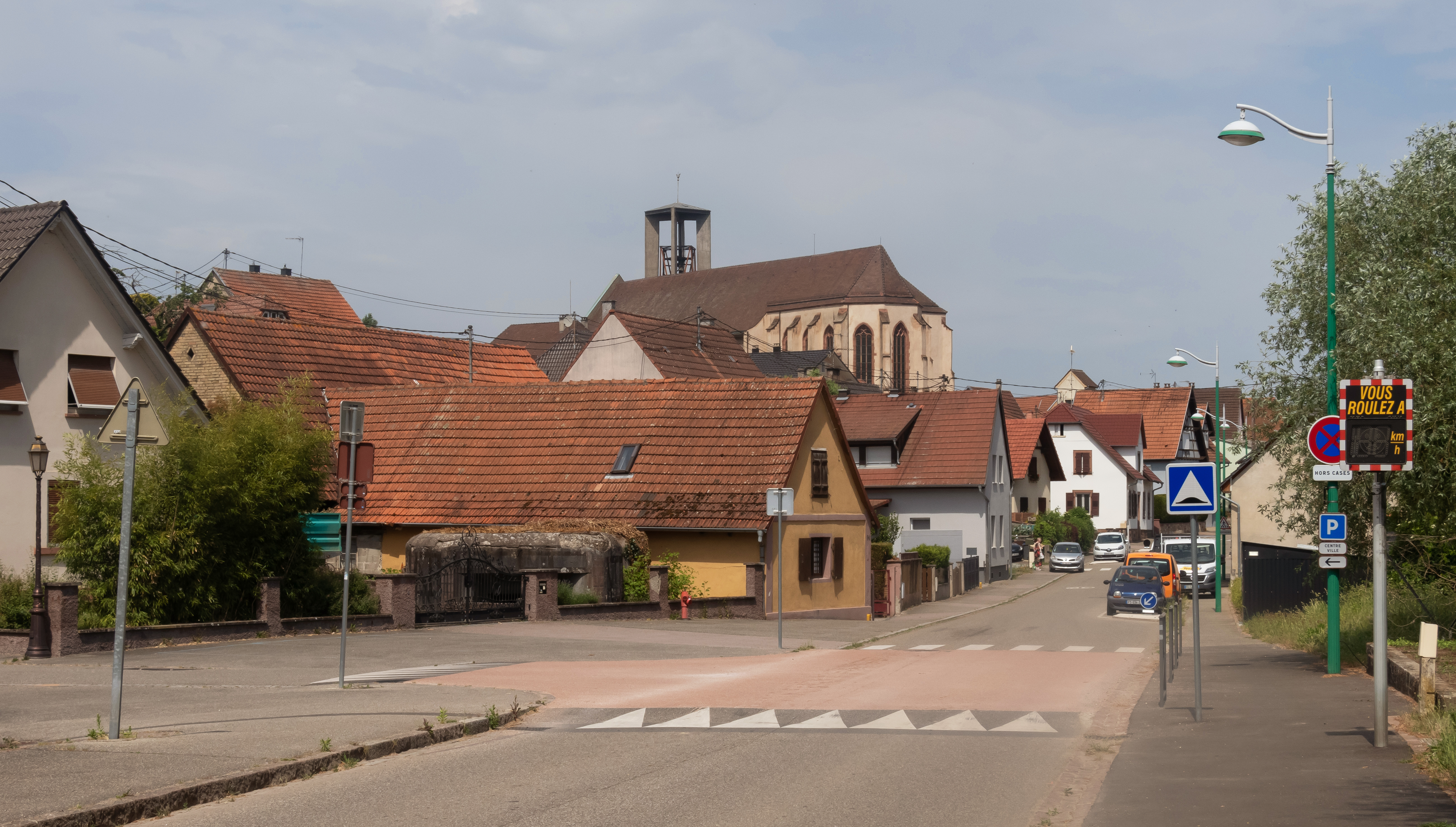
Seltz, view to the village with church (l'église Saint-Etienne) in the background

Seltz (French pronunciation: [sɛlts]; German: Selz) is a commune in the Bas-Rhin department of the Grand Est region in north-eastern France. It is located on the Sauer River near its confluence with the Rhine, opposite the German town of Rastatt.

== History ==
The former Celtic settlement of Saliso near a crossing of the Rhine river was mentioned as the Roman castrum Saletio in the Notitia Dignitatum about 425. Later a part of the German stem duchy of Swabia, Emperor Otto I granted the area to his wife Adelaide of Burgundy in 968. Saint Adelaide established Selz Abbey in 991 and died here eight years later.

In 1357 Emperor Charles IV of Luxembourg raised Selz to an Imperial city, after which the town joined the Alsatian Décapole league. It however lost its immediate status in 1414, when it was mediatised by Elector Palatine Louis III of Wittelsbach. Seltz finally was annexed by France in 1680.

== Population ==
Historical population
Year	Pop.	±% p.a.
1968	2,373	—
1975	2,570	+1.15%
1982	2,637	+0.37%
1990	2,584	−0.25%
1999	2,985	+1.62%
2007	3,189	+0.83%
2012	3,281	+0.57%
2017	3,235	−0.28%
2023	3,204	−0.16%
Source: INSEE

== Landmarks ==
Église Saint-Étienne de Seltz was last built in 1954–6.

Ferry Seltz - Plittersdorf (Germany). The Rhine ferry Seltz - Plittersdorf (in France: Bac Seltz - Plittersdorf or Bac de Seltz) is a reaction (cable) ferry across the Rhine south of Karlsruhe. It connects the French municipality of Seltz in Alsace on the left bank of the Rhine with the German village of Plittersdorf, a part of Rastatt, on the right bank of the Rhine. The operator is the French European Collectivity of Alsace, the use of the ferry is free.

== Twin Towns - Sister Cities ==
Seltz is twinned with:

- Obervellach, Austria
- Santa Adélia, Brazil

== See also ==
- Communes of the Bas-Rhin department
