= Argame =

- Parish
- Location within Spain
- Coordinates: 43.3°N 5.883333°W
- Country: Spain
- Autonomous community: Asturias
- Province: Asturias
- Municipality: Morcín

Population
  - Total: 205

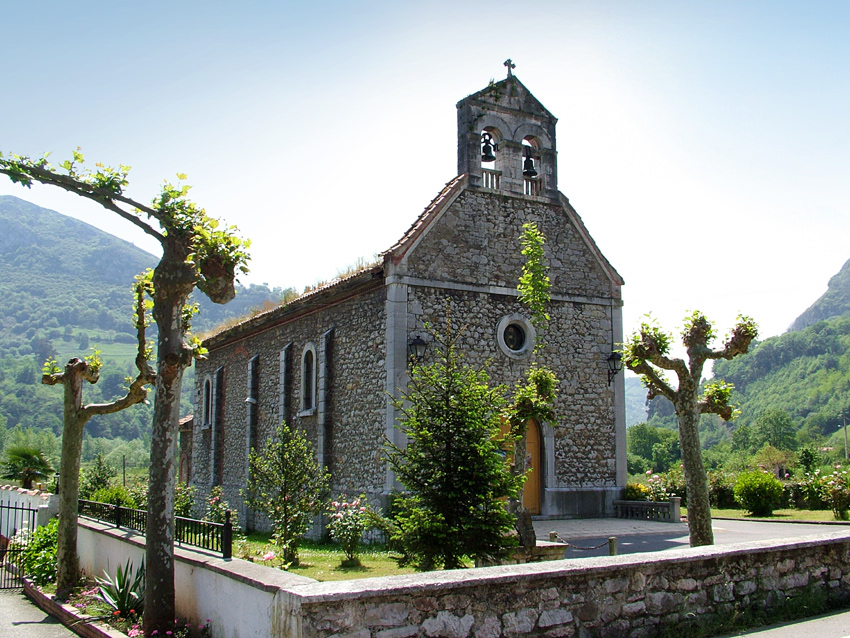
Church of San Miguel de Argame

Argame is one of seven parishes (administrative divisions) in Morcín, a municipality within the province and autonomous community of Asturias, in northern Spain.

== Villages ==
- Argame
- La Carrera de Abajo
- El Collado
- La Rectoría y Roces
