= Rosheim =

- Commune
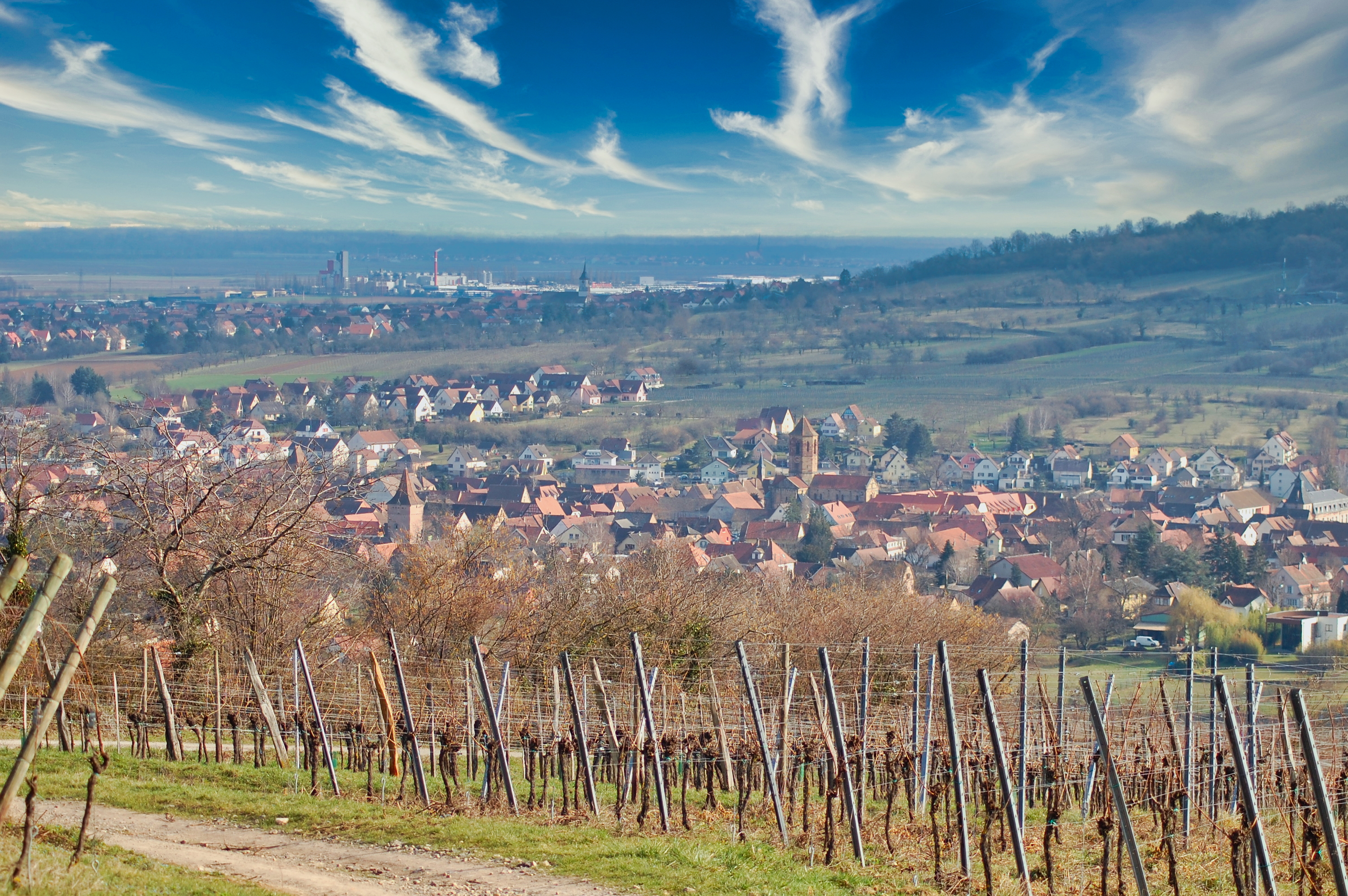
- View of Rosheim and surroundings

- Coat of arms
- Location of Rosheim
- Location within France Location within Grand Est
- Coordinates: 48°30′N 7°28′E
- Country: France
- Region: Grand Est
- Department: Bas-Rhin
- Arrondissement: Molsheim
- Canton: Molsheim

Government
  - Mayor (2026–32): Francis Bachelet
- Area^{1}: 29.55 km^{2} (11.41 sq mi)
- Highest elevation: 842 m (2,762 ft)
- Lowest elevation: 164 m (538 ft)
- Population (2023): 5,457
  - Density: 184.7/km^{2} (478.3/sq mi)
- Time zone: UTC+01:00 (CET)
  - Summer (DST): UTC+02:00 (CEST)
- INSEE/Postal code: 67411 /67560
- ^{1} French Land Register data, which excludes lakes, ponds, glaciers > 1 km^{2} (0.386 sq mi or 247 acres) and river estuaries.

Rosheim (French pronunciation: [ʁo.sajm]; Alsatian: Rose) is a commune in the Bas-Rhin department in Grand Est in north-eastern France.

It lies 25 km (16 mi) southwest of Strasbourg, on the eastern slopes of the Vosges mountains. It is a winemaking town on the tourist "Road of the Wines of Alsace" and the Route Romane d'Alsace ("Romanesque route of Alsace").

== History ==
Rosheim was first mentioned in a document in 778 as Rodasheim. In 1262 it received its town charter, combined with the right to build a town wall. From the 14th to 17th centuries, Rosheim was an Imperial City of the Holy Roman Empire, and founded the Décapole confederation with nine other Alsatian Imperial Cities in 1354, the goal was to maintain their rights. Like the other Decapolitan cities, it was awarded to France by the Peace of Westphalia and finally lost its independence under the Treaties of Nijmegen and was annexed by France.

== Population ==
Historical population
Year	Pop.	±% p.a.
1968	3,291	—
1975	3,499	+0.88%
1982	3,766	+1.06%
1990	4,016	+0.81%
1999	4,548	+1.39%
2007	4,721	+0.47%
2012	4,891	+0.71%
2017	5,149	+1.03%
2023	5,457	+0.97%
Source: INSEE

== Sights ==
- Church Saint-Pierre-et-Paul (building 12th century, tower 14th century, organ 18th century)
- Church Saint-Etienne (18th century, belltower 12th century)
- Maison païenne (“pagan house”, 12th century)
- City Hall (18th century)
- Old well (Puits aux six seaux) (17th century)
- Four fortified tower-gates (13th and 14th century)
- Half-timbered houses (16th century)

== Notable people ==
- Heinrich Eggestein (ca. 1415–88), pioneering book printer
- Jean-Marie Lehn (born 1939), Nobel Prize 1987
- Claude Vasconi (born 1940), architect

== See also ==
- Communes of the Bas-Rhin department
