= Plaine-d'Argenson =

- Commune
- Location of Plaine-d'Argenson
- Location within France Location within Nouvelle-Aquitaine
- Coordinates: 46°09′15″N 0°29′05″W
- Country: France
- Region: Nouvelle-Aquitaine
- Department: Deux-Sèvres
- Arrondissement: Niort
- Canton: Mignon-et-Boutonne
- Intercommunality: CA Niortais

Government
  - Mayor (2020–2026): Jean-François Salanon
- Area^{1}: 44.93 km^{2} (17.35 sq mi)
- Population (2023): 1,006
  - Density: 22.39/km^{2} (57.99/sq mi)
- Time zone: UTC+01:00 (CET)
  - Summer (DST): UTC+02:00 (CEST)
- INSEE/Postal code: 79078 /79360
- ^{1} French Land Register data, which excludes lakes, ponds, glaciers > 1 km^{2} (0.386 sq mi or 247 acres) and river estuaries.

Plaine-d'Argenson (French pronunciation: [plɛn daʁʒɑ̃sɔ̃]) is a commune in the department of Deux-Sèvres, western France. The municipality was established on 1 January 2018 by merger of the former communes of Prissé-la-Charrière (the seat), Belleville, Boisserolles and Saint-Étienne-la-Cigogne.

== See also ==
- Communes of the Deux-Sèvres department
