= Belleville, Deux-Sèvres =

Belleville
- Part of Plaine-d'Argenson
- Coat of arms
- Location of Belleville
- Location within France Location within Nouvelle-Aquitaine
- Coordinates: 46°07′37″N 0°29′53″W
- Country: France
- Region: Nouvelle-Aquitaine
- Department: Deux-Sèvres
- Arrondissement: Niort
- Canton: Mignon-et-Boutonne
- Commune: Plaine-d'Argenson
- Area^{1}: 11.53 km^{2} (4.45 sq mi)
- Elevation: 52 m (171 ft)
- Highest elevation: 82 m (269 ft)
- Lowest elevation: 36 m (118 ft)
- Population (2019): 129
  - Density: 11.2/km^{2} (29.0/sq mi)
- Time zone: UTC+01:00 (CET)
  - Summer (DST): UTC+02:00 (CEST)
- Postal code: 79360
- ^{1} French Land Register data, which excludes lakes, ponds, glaciers > 1 km^{2} (0.386 sq mi or 247 acres) and river estuaries.

Belleville (French pronunciation: [bɛlvil]) is a former commune in the Deux-Sèvres department in the Nouvelle-Aquitaine region in western France. On 1 January 2018, it was merged into the new commune of Plaine-d'Argenson.

== See also ==
- Communes of the Deux-Sèvres department
