= Romano-Gallic Baths of Entrammes =

Gallo-Roman thermal baths in Entrammes, France

Coordinates: 48°01′23″N 00°46′11″W

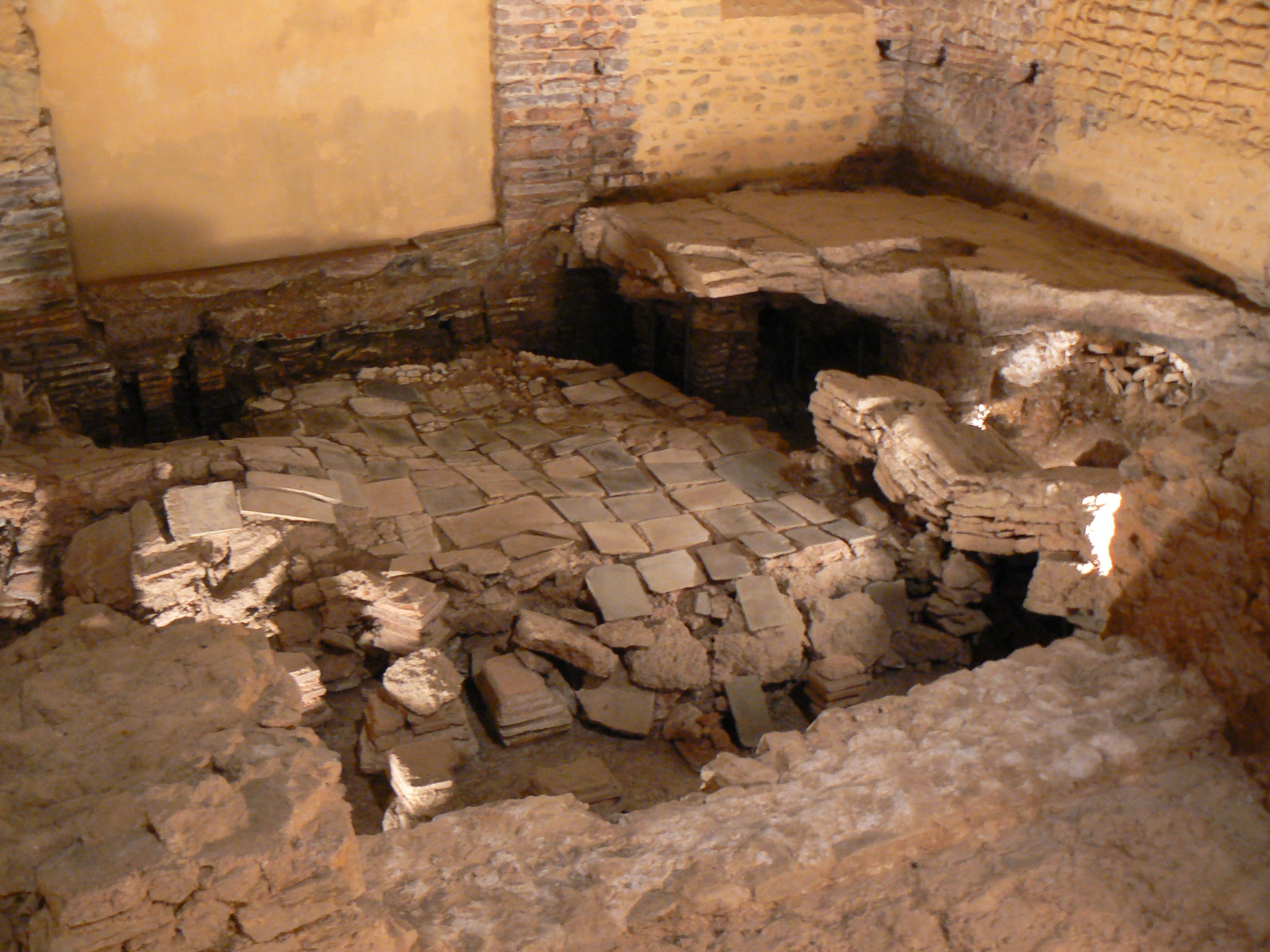
The caldarium (hot water room)

The Roman-Gaul Baths of Entrammes (Thermes gallo-romains d'Entrammes in French) is a complex of Gallo-Roman thermal baths (thermae) in Entrammes, Mayenne, France. The baths were partially incorporated into a church with the hypocaust surviving below the new structure. The remains were discovered in 1987.

== History ==
The thermal site was discovered in 1987. Archaeological surveys were done to reassess the church of Saint-Étienne, a building which dates back to Roman times. A hypocaust in good condition was found below the church, confirming the presence of a thermal site of the 2nd century.

== Access and conservation ==
Since 1 September 1988 the baths have been classified as a historical monument by the Ministry of Culture. Tours are organised by the local tourism office.

== Gallery ==
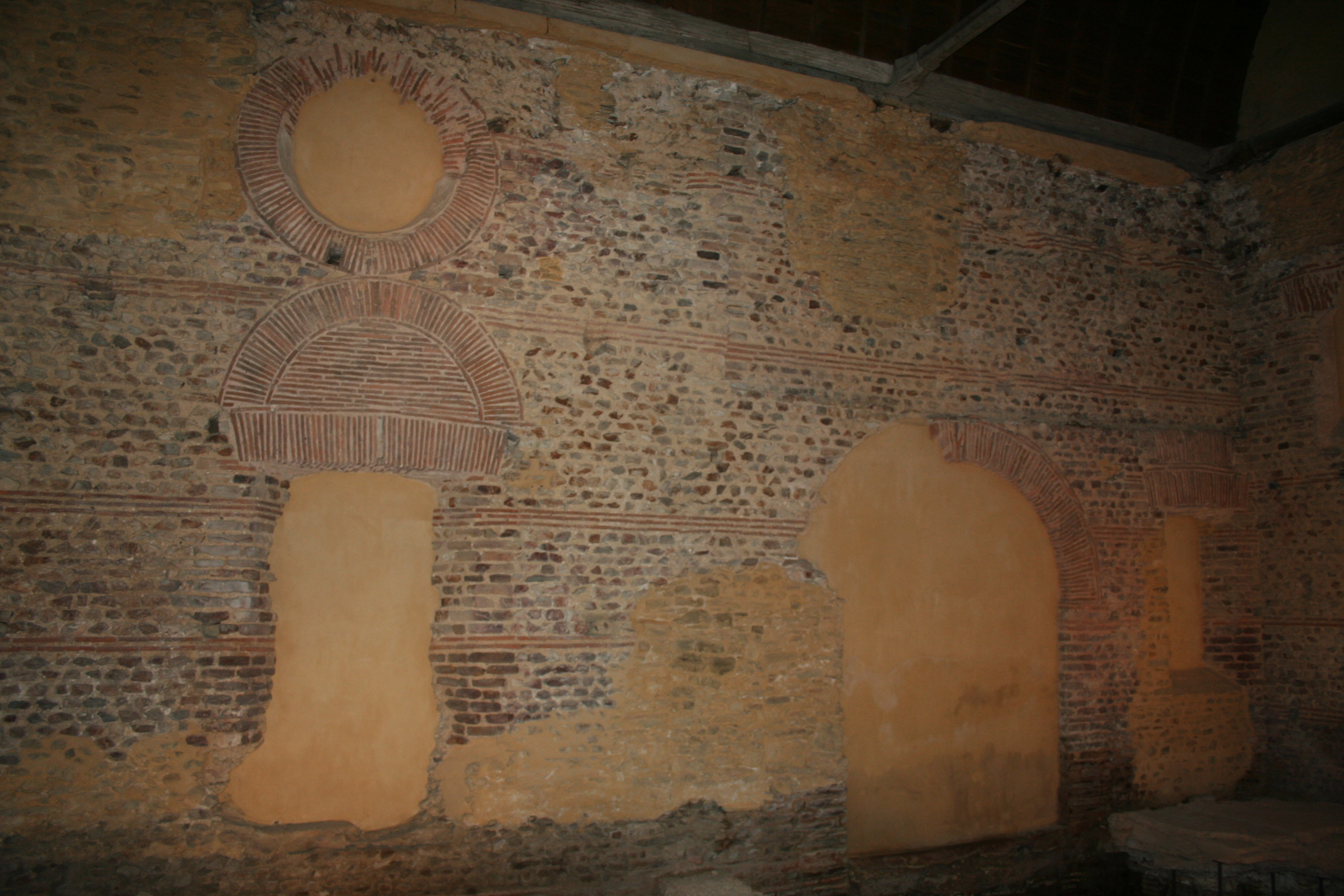
The entrance's wall

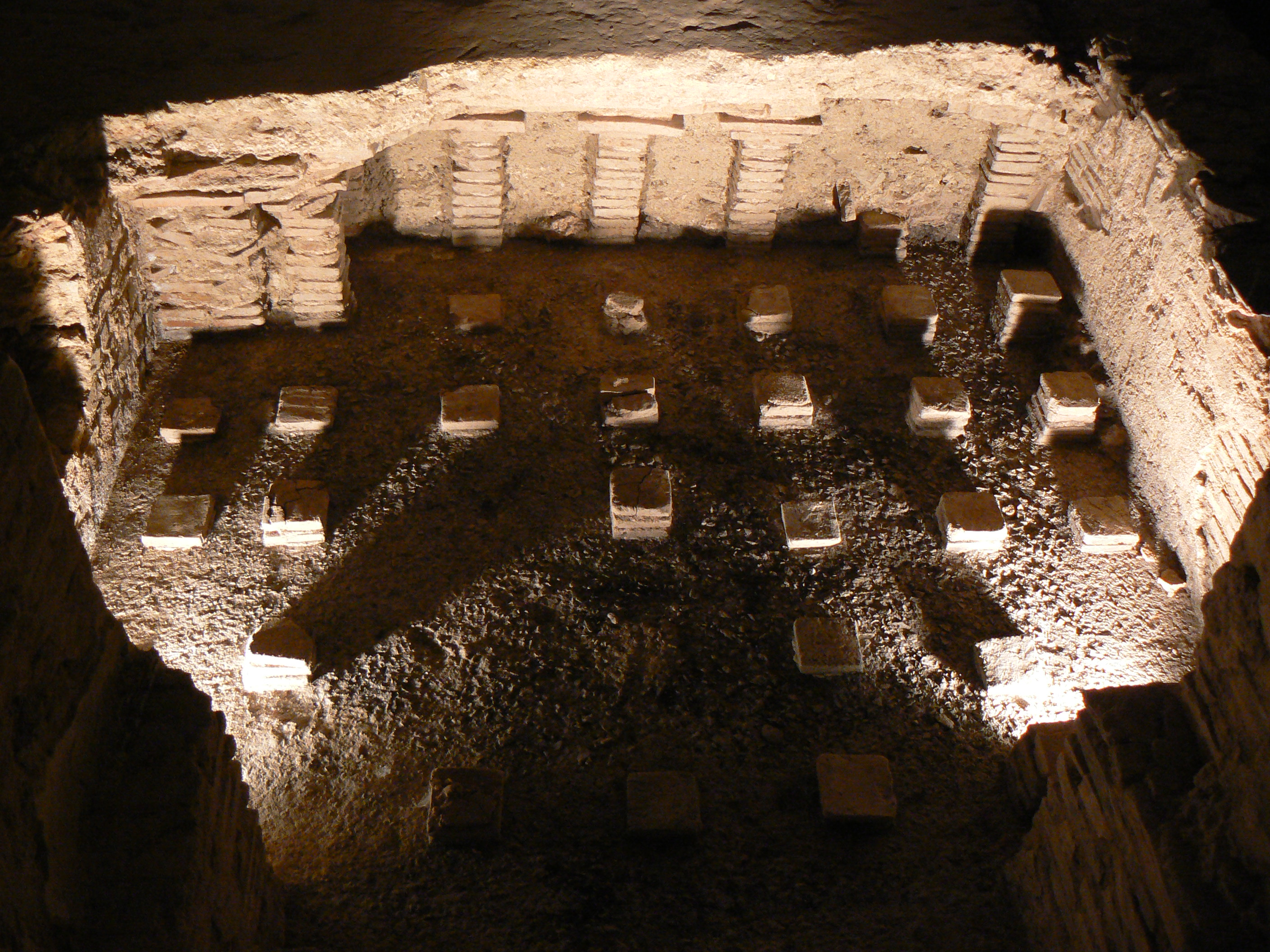
The hypocaust

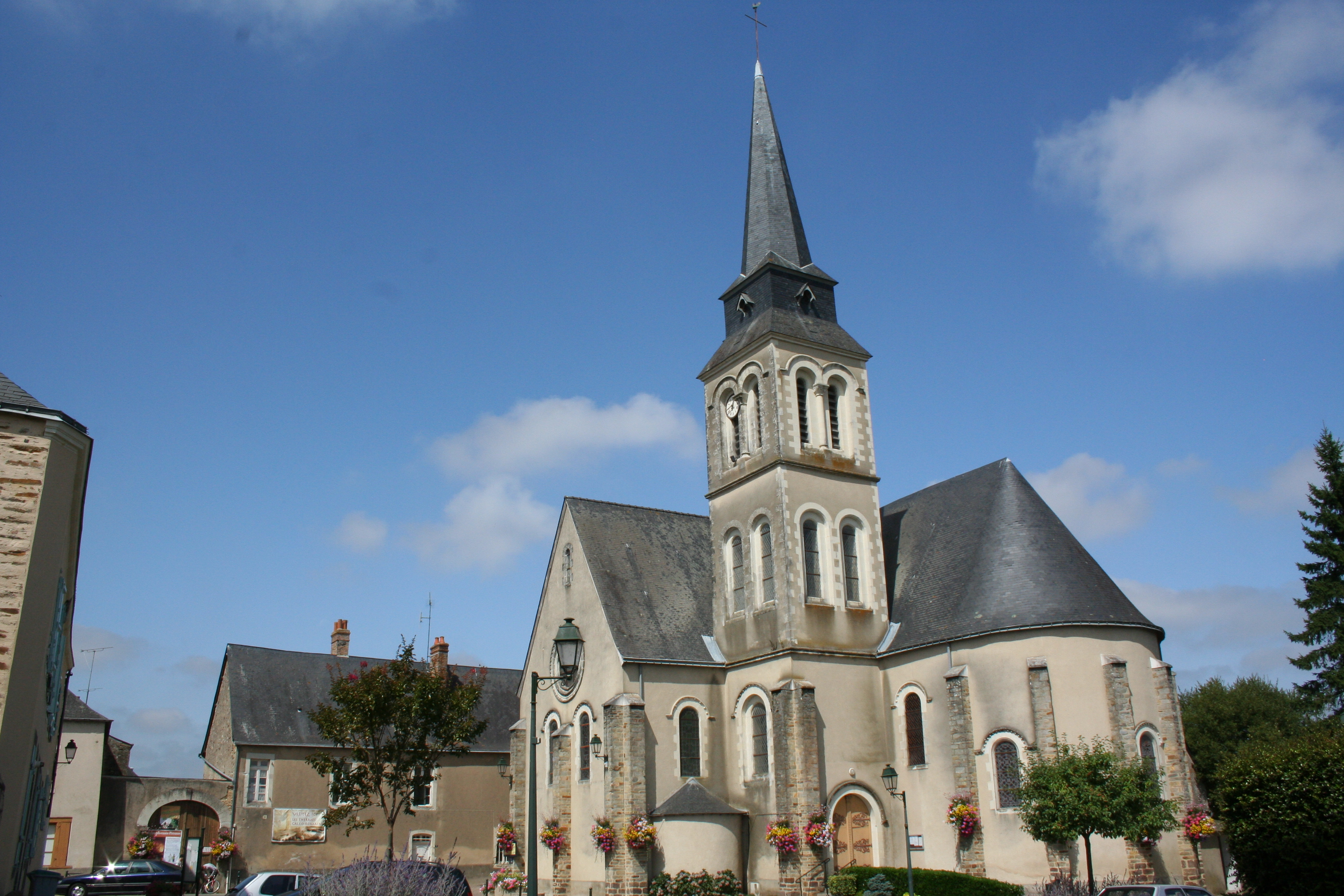
Parish Church

== Bibliography ==
- Jacques Naveau (2002). Entrammes, Mayenne, les thermes gallo-romains in "Arts, Recherches et créations" (published by Revue 303)
- Jacques Naveau (1992). La Mayenne, 53: carte archéologique de la Gaule (ISBN 2877540154)
- Jacques Naveau (1991); Les thermes romains d'Entrammes; Société d'archéologie et d'histoire de la Mayenne. Laval
