= Peñerúes =

Peñerudes
- Parish
- Location within Spain
- Coordinates: 43.283333°N 5.933333°W
- Country: Spain
- Autonomous community: Asturias
- Province: Asturias
- Municipality: Morcín

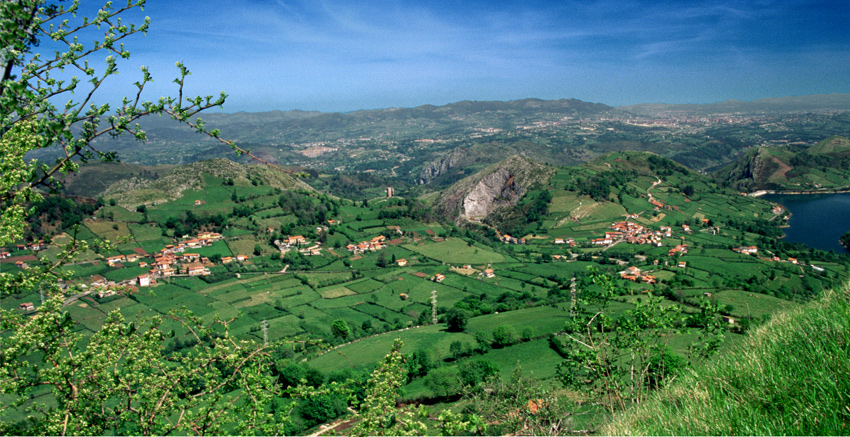
Panorama of Peñerúes.

Peñerúes is one of seven parishes (administrative divisions) in Morcín, a municipality within the province and autonomous community of Asturias, in northern Spain.

== Villages ==
- L'Artusu
- Barrea
- La Roza
- Campo
- La Cotina
- La Gantal
- El Palacio
- Requexo

Small population entities

- El Caleyón
- La Casona
- La Escalera
- El Fontán
- El Navalón
- El Recuestru
- La Roza
- Treslafonte
