= Morcín =

- Municipality
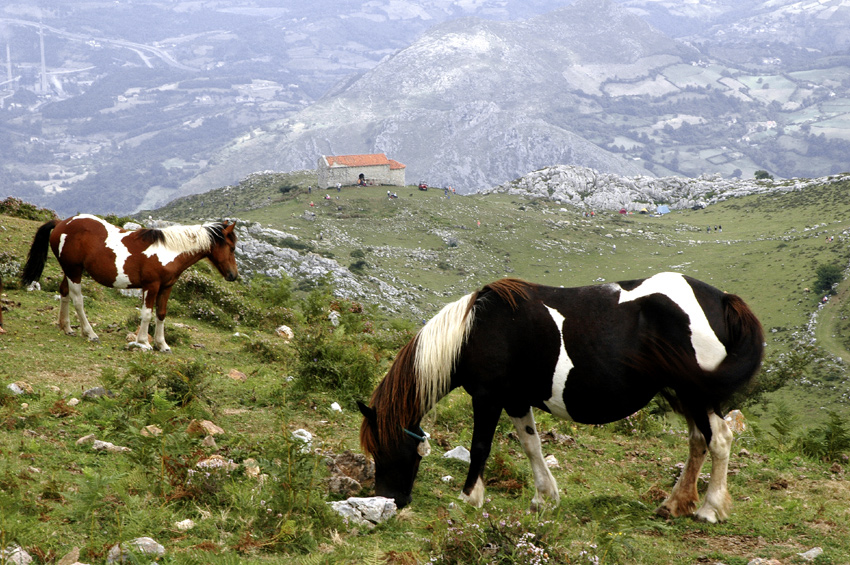
- Asturcones in the Morcín landscape

- Flag Coat of arms

- Location in Spain
- Coordinates: 43°17′N 5°53′W
- Country: Spain
- Autonomous community: Asturias
- Province: Asturias
- Comarca: Oviedo
- Judicial district: Mieres
- Capital: Santa Eulalia de Morcín

Government
  - Mayor: Maximino García Suárez ( iU)

Area
  - Total: 50.05 km^{2} (19.32 sq mi)
- Highest elevation: 1,712 m (5,617 ft)

Population (2025-01-01)
  - Total: 2,460
  - Density: 49.2/km^{2} (127/sq mi)
- Demonym: morciniego/a
- Time zone: UTC+1 (CET)
  - Summer (DST): UTC+2 (CEST)
- Postal code: 33161 a 33163
- Official language(s): Asturian, Spanish
- Website: Official website

Morcín is a municipality in the Autonomous Community of the Principality of Asturias, Spain. It is bordered on the north by Santo Adriano and Ribera de Arriba, on the east by Ribera and Mieres, on the south by Riosa on the west by Quirós.

== Parishes ==
- Argame
- La Foz de Morcín
- La Piñera
- Peñerudes
- San Esteban
- San Sebastián
- Santa Eulalia

== Twin towns ==
- Arroyo Naranjo, Cuba
- Bir Enzaran, Western Sahara
- Lécousse, France

== Gallery ==
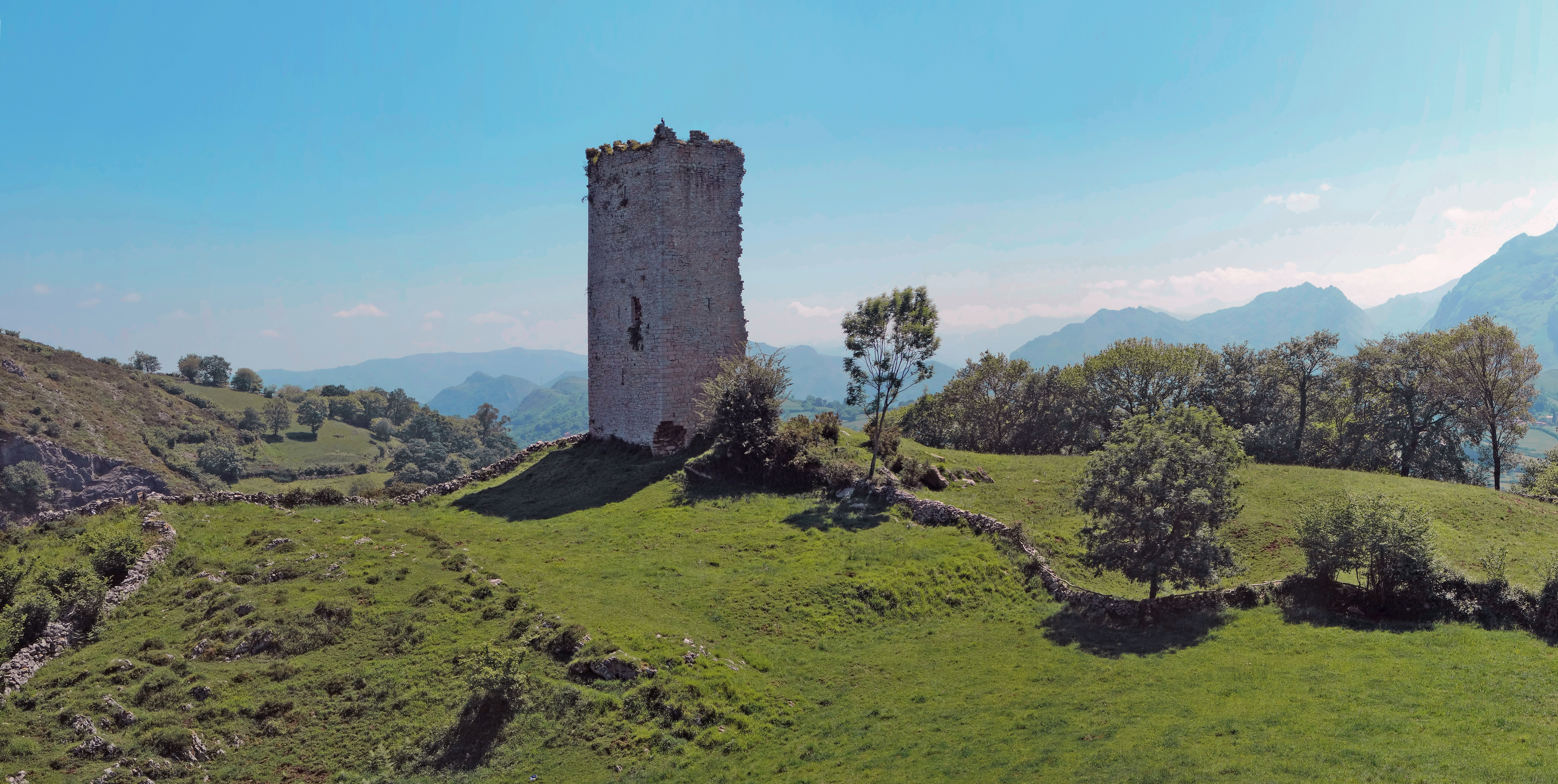
Torreón de Peñerudes

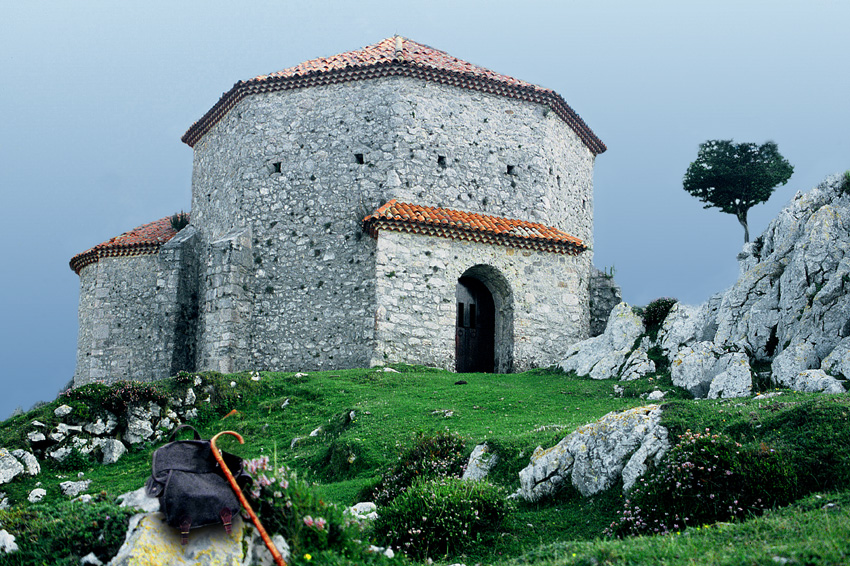
Hermitage of Santiago, in the Monsacro mountain; Morcín, Asturias

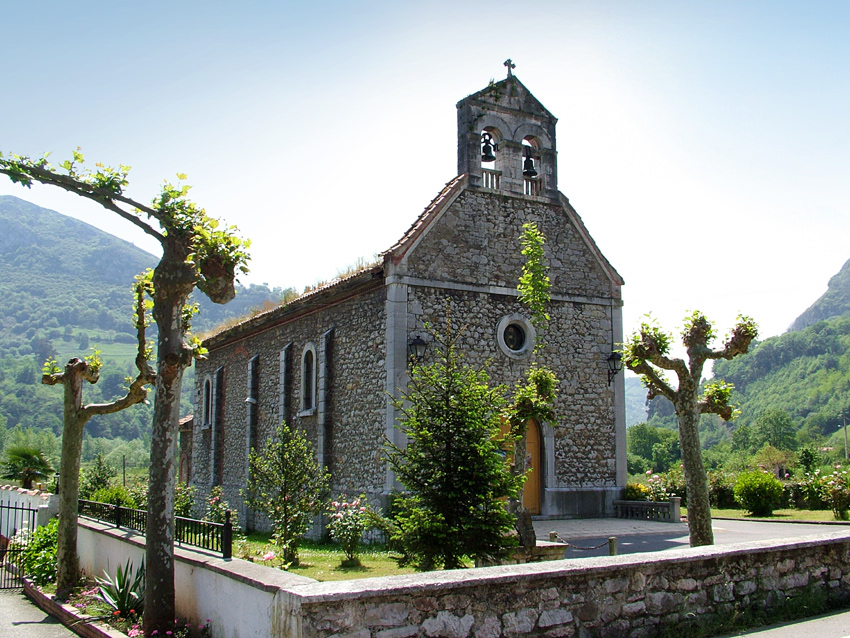
Church of the parish of San Miguel de Argame

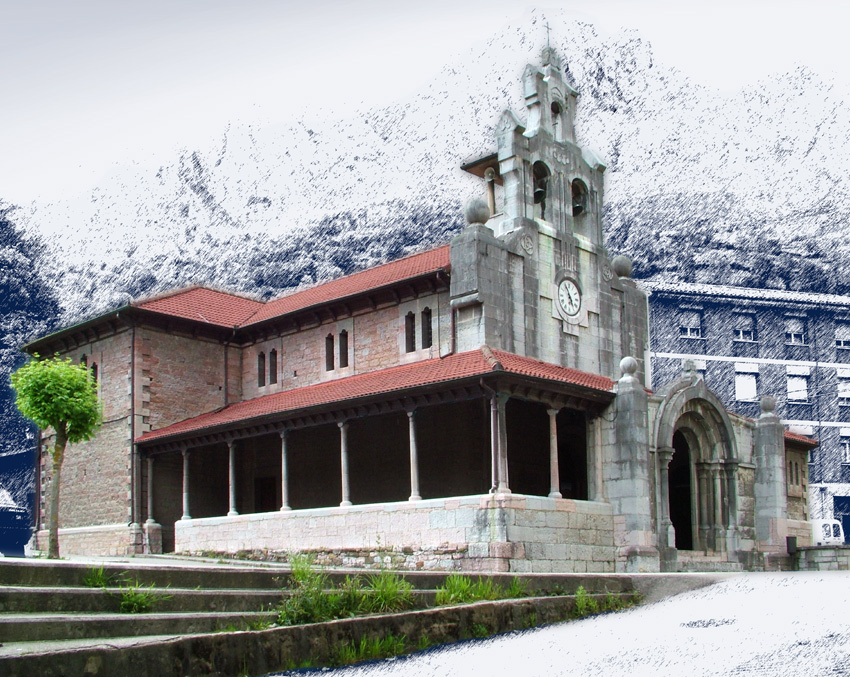
Church of the parish of San Antonio de la Foz; La Foz de Morcín

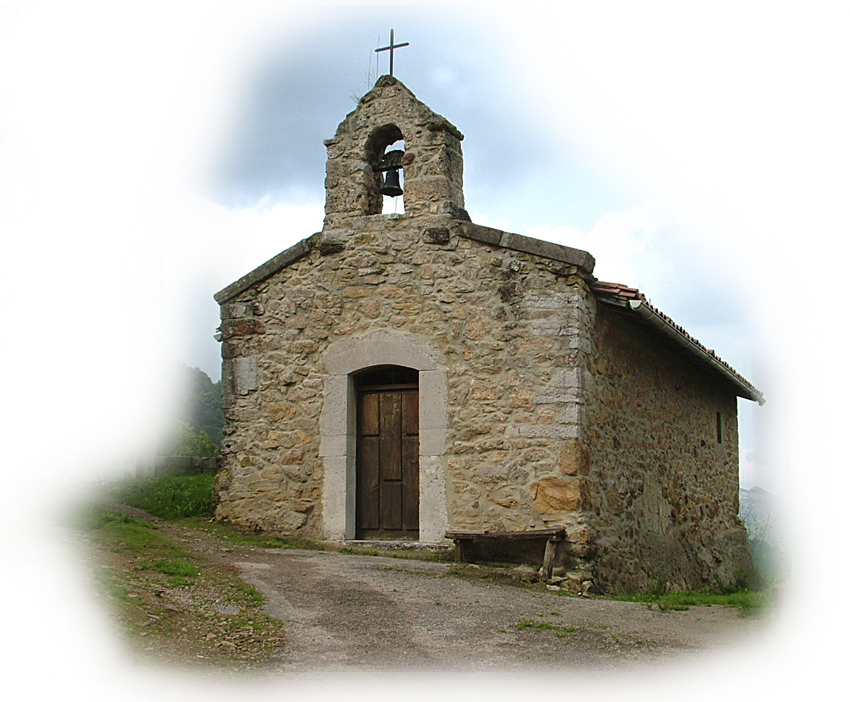
Hermitage of Santa Cecilia en el Vallín

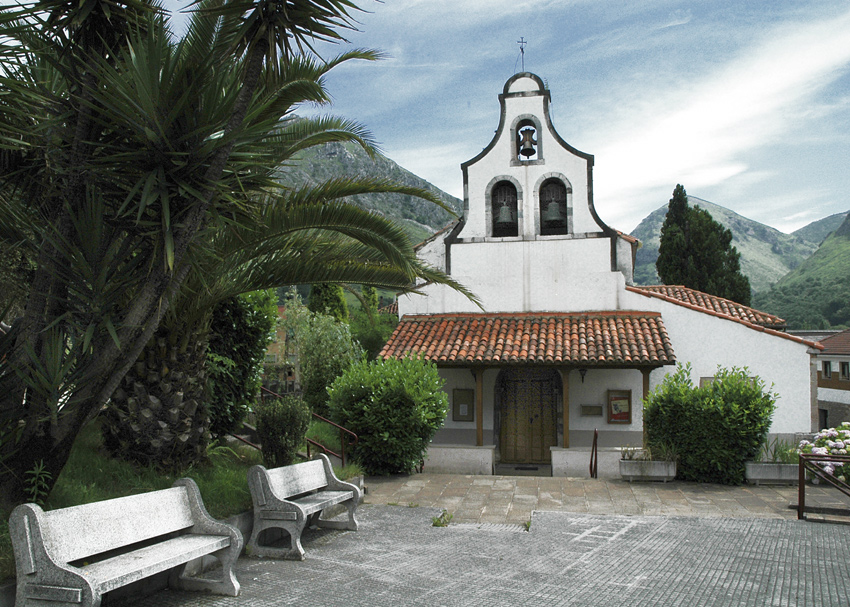
Church of the parish of Santa Eulalia de Morcín

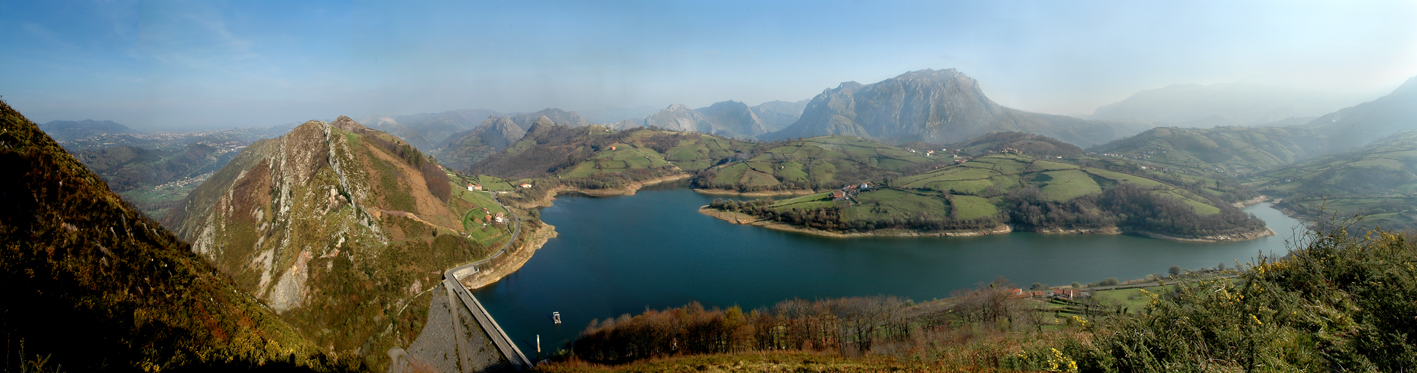
Embalse de Alfilorios

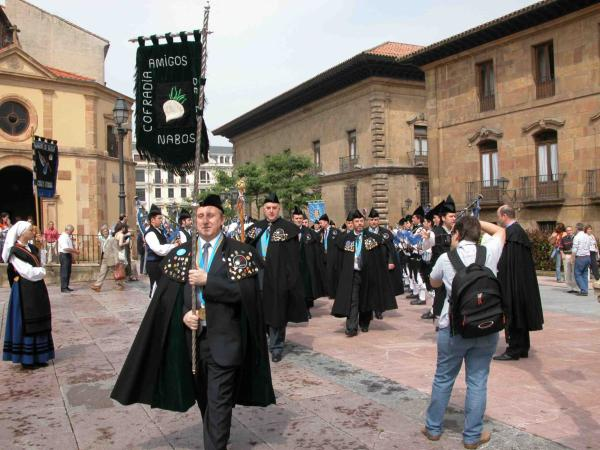
Cofradía Amigos de los Nabos

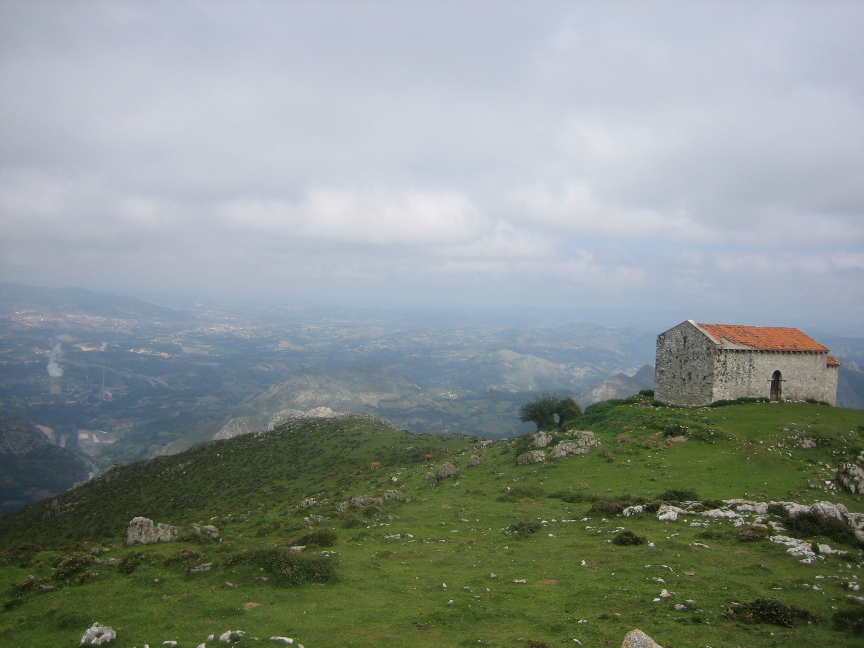
Medieval chapel in Monsacro mountain

== See also ==
- List of municipalities in Asturias
