= Boofzheim =

Boofzheim Boofze
- Commune
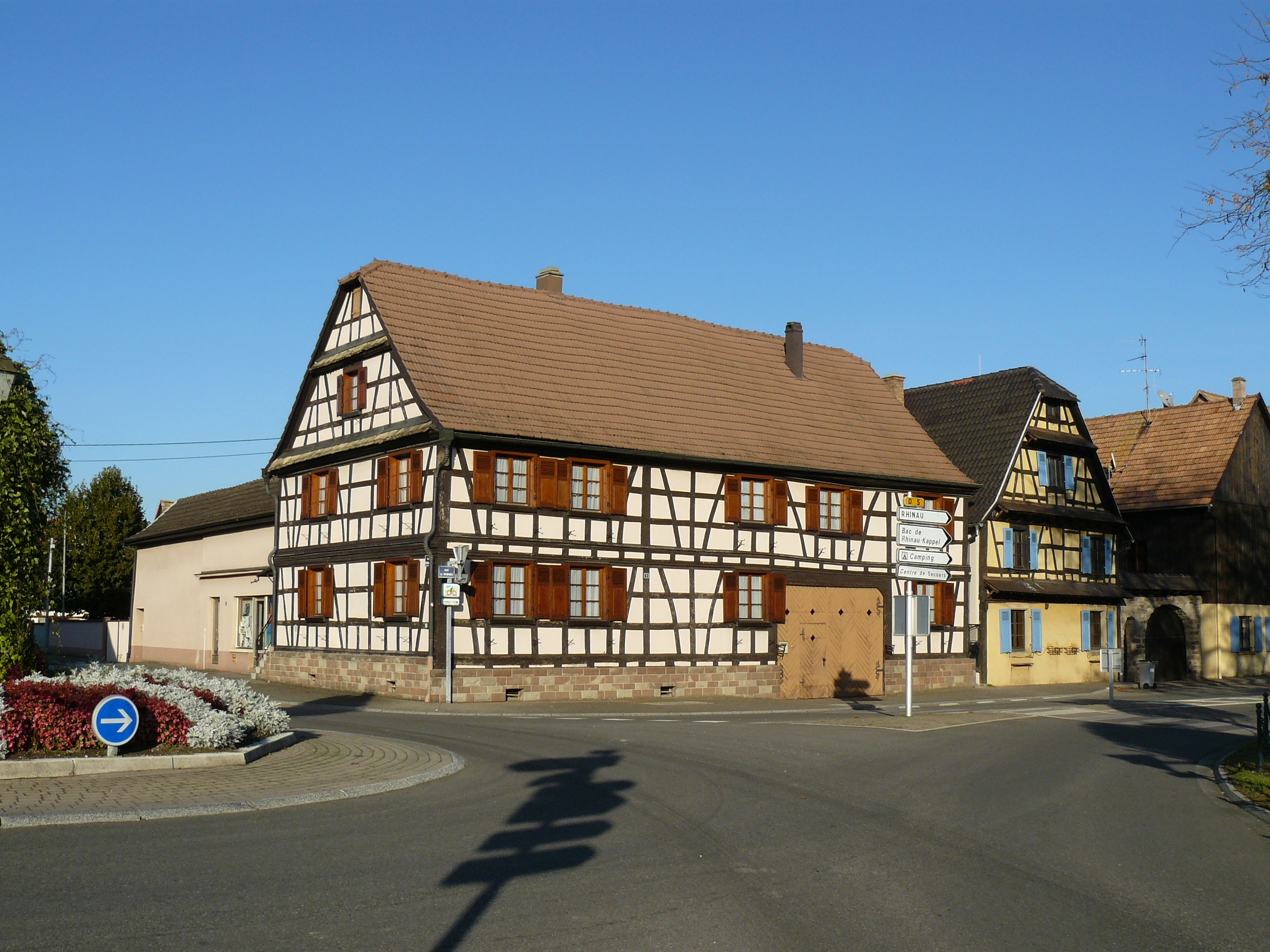
- A house in Boofzheim

- Coat of arms
- Location of Boofzheim
- Location within France Location within Grand Est
- Coordinates: 48°19′57″N 7°40′54″E
- Country: France
- Region: Grand Est
- Department: Bas-Rhin
- Arrondissement: Sélestat-Erstein
- Canton: Erstein
- Intercommunality: CC du Canton d'Erstein

Government
  - Mayor (2020–2026): Eric Klethi
- Area^{1}: 11.94 km^{2} (4.61 sq mi)
- Highest elevation: 161 m (528 ft)
- Lowest elevation: 155 m (509 ft)
- Population (2023): 1,379
  - Density: 115.5/km^{2} (299.1/sq mi)
- Time zone: UTC+01:00 (CET)
  - Summer (DST): UTC+02:00 (CEST)
- INSEE/Postal code: 67055 /67860
- ^{1} French Land Register data, which excludes lakes, ponds, glaciers > 1 km^{2} (0.386 sq mi or 247 acres) and river estuaries.

Boofzheim is a commune in the Bas-Rhin department in Grand Est in north-eastern France. Its name is probably derived from the personal name Boffi or Boofo. Variants of the name include Boofi - Boffesheim - Bofftsheim - Boffsheim - Bototzheim - Booftzheim - Booffzheim.

== History ==
It is said that from the fifteenth century the village belonged to the Mieg family. In 1545, they introduced the Protestant Reformation into the village and the village church of St Etienne was turned into a Protestant chapel.

According to another source, Sebastian Mieg (Mueg), from a Strasbourg merchant family, bought half of Boofzheim in 1567 from the Abbess of St Etienne and built a castle on the land. This castle was burnt down by the Swedes in 1636 and was rebuilt in 1642. It was to the east of the Catholic Church, but no trace remains today. Église Saint-Étienne de Boofzheim was last built in 1684.

From 1687 to 1854, the Church was shared by Protestants and Catholics, after which the Protestants built their own church and St Etienne's was given back to the Catholics. In 1852, there were 953 Protestants and 200 Catholics in the village.

== See also ==
- Communes of the Bas-Rhin department
