= Prissé-la-Charrière =

- Part of Plaine-d'Argenson
- Location of Prissé-la-Charrière
- Location within France Location within Nouvelle-Aquitaine
- Coordinates: 46°09′12″N 0°28′59″W
- Country: France
- Region: Nouvelle-Aquitaine
- Department: Deux-Sèvres
- Arrondissement: Niort
- Canton: Mignon-et-Boutonne
- Commune: Plaine-d'Argenson
- Area^{1}: 19.94 km^{2} (7.70 sq mi)
- Elevation: 69 m (226 ft)
- Highest elevation: 73 m (240 ft)
- Lowest elevation: 30 m (98 ft)
- Population (2015): 646
  - Density: 32.4/km^{2} (83.9/sq mi)
- Time zone: UTC+01:00 (CET)
  - Summer (DST): UTC+02:00 (CEST)
- Postal code: 79360
- ^{1} French Land Register data, which excludes lakes, ponds, glaciers > 1 km^{2} (0.386 sq mi or 247 acres) and river estuaries.

Prissé-la-Charrière (French pronunciation: [pʁise la ʃaʁjɛʁ]) is a former commune in the Deux-Sèvres department in western France. On 1 January 2018, it was merged into the new commune of Plaine-d'Argenson.

== Geography ==
Is located in Deux-Sèvres in the Nouvelle-Aquitaine region of France. The closest airport to Prissé-la-Charrière is La Rochelle Airport (56 km).

== See also ==
- Communes of the Deux-Sèvres department
