= San Sebastián (Morcín) =

- Parish
- Location within Spain
- Coordinates: 43.566667°N 5.9°W
- Country: Spain
- Autonomous community: Asturias
- Province: Asturias
- Municipality: Morcín

San Sebastián is one of seven parishes (administrative divisions) in Morcín, a municipality within the province and autonomous community of Asturias, in northern Spain.

== Villages ==
- Busloñe
- La Caleya
- La Carbayosa
- Cardeo
- La Enseca
- Melandrera
- Mellampo
- El Pareo
- El Pumar
- El Tejo
- La Vara
- El Pereo
- San Sebastián
