= St. Stephen's School, Chandigarh =

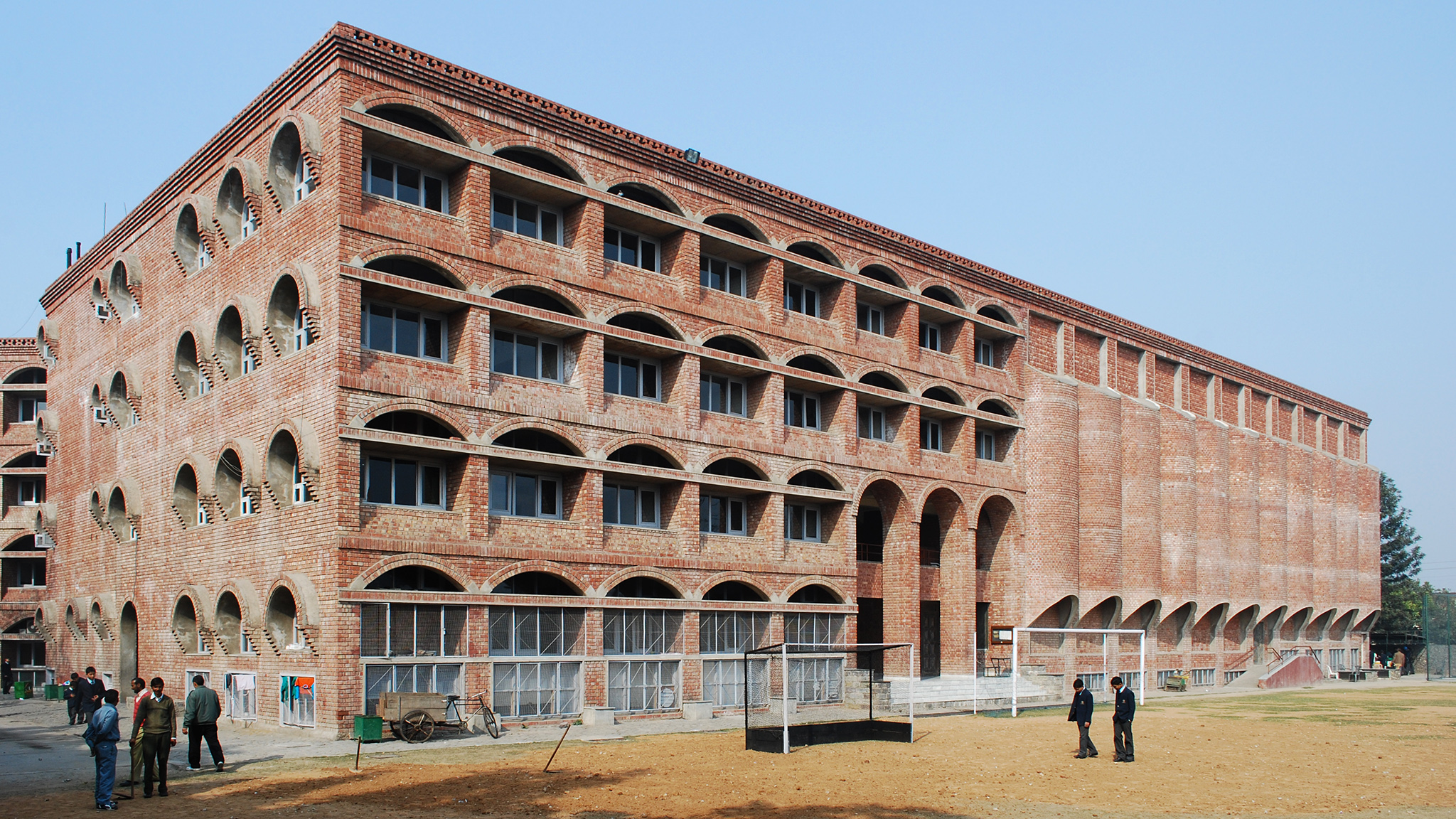

Location
- Sector – 45B; Chandigarh, 160047; India; 30.7084°N 76.7659°E

Information
- Type: Private school
- Motto: Semper Sursum – Always Aim Higher
- Established: 12 April 1982; 44 years ago
- Founder: Harold Anthony Patrick Carver
- Principal: Barry Francis
- Staff: 165
- Grades: Lower Five – Upper Five
- Enrollment: 2400
- Houses: 4 (Jupiter, Mars, Neptune, Saturn)
- Colours: Blue and grey
- Affiliation: ICSE
- Alumni: Old Stephenians
- Website: www.stephenschandigarh.com

St. Stephen's School is a Roman Catholic school located in Chandigarh, India.

The school was founded by an Anglo-Indian Catholic Principal Harold Anthony Patrick Carver in 1982. The school is affiliated to the Indian Certificate of Secondary Education (ICSE) board.

== History ==
The school was founded in 1982 by an Anglo-Indian Catholic Principal, Harold Carver. He was previously a teacher in St. Joseph's College, Allahabad and St. John's High School, Chandigarh run by the Christian Brothers.

The school was started on 12 April 1982, as a primary school from nursery to class five with a staff of twelve members. Located in three bungalows in sector eight, arrangements were later made in sectors nine and eleven until land was allotted in Sector 45 by the UT Administration. When the first batch of Class ten passed out in 1988, the school was upgraded to senior secondary level in 1997.

In October 2010, Camilla, Duchess of Cornwall, from the United Kingdom, visited the school. She viewed an exhibition of models on environmental issues and another about festivals and cuisine, which was organized by the UK-India Education and Research Initiative (UKIERI). She also spoke to students at Park View Academy in Haringey, London, which is twinned with St. Stephen's, via a video link.

The school is housed in its own four-story building with over 2400 students and 165 staff members.

== Sports ==
Teams represent the school in state and national level competitions. Sports and games include cricket, association football, carrom, gymnastics, judo, karate and soft tennis. The school also runs a cricket academy.

=== Facilities ===
Sports facilities include:

- Multi-purpose Hall with a gymnasium and facilities for indoor badminton, basketball, and table tennis
- 1 pitches
- 1 Basketball Court
- 4 cricket Nets
- 1 field for Field Hockey and Association Football, which can be converted to four cricket pitches to accommodate seasonal sports, and a pavilion

== Notable alumni ==
A student attending the school or an alumnus is termed a "Stephenian". There is an alumni association called as The Old Stephenian Society (TOSS).

- Abhinav Bindra – Gold medalist for India in the 10 metre air rifle event at the 2008 Summer Olympics.
- Uday Singh Taunque – First soldier of Sikh descent to die in Iraq War while serving the United States Army. A memorial has also been constructed in Uday's memory at the school.
- Gurpreet Singh Sandhu – Indian professional football goalkeeper, played for Norwegian club Stabæk.

== See also ==
- St. Stephen's School (disambiguation) – List of schools named after Saint Stephen.
- Council for the Indian School Certificate Examinations (CISCE), India
- Indian School Certificate (ISC), India
