= La Piñera =

- Parish
- Location within Spain
- Coordinates: 43.366667°N 5.266667°W
- Country: Spain
- Autonomous community: Asturias
- Province: Asturias
- Municipality: Morcín

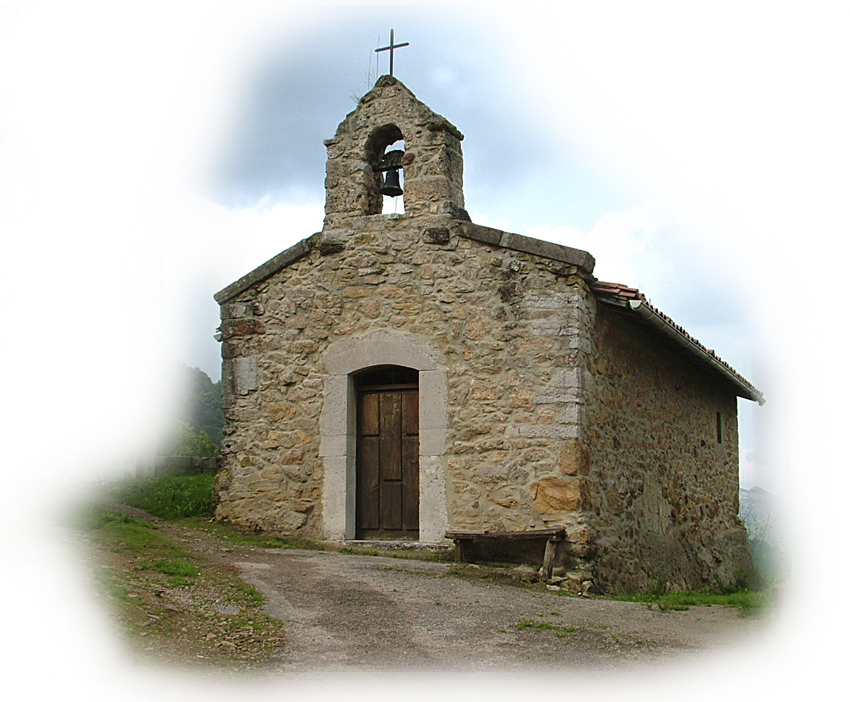
Hermitage of Santa Cecilia in El Vallin

La Piñera is one of seven parishes (administrative divisions) in Morcín, a municipality within the province and autonomous community of Asturias, in northern Spain.

== Villages ==
- El Ablanedo
- Afilorio de Abajo
- Afilorio de Arriba
- Afilorio del Medio
- La Alguera
- Campo de la Iglesia
- El Cogollo
- Las Cortes
- La Cuesta
- Los Duernos
- Los González
- Lavandera
- Otero
- El Río
- El Vallín
- La Piñera
