= Église Saint-Étienne de Rosheim =

Church in Bas-Rhin, France

Coordinates: 48°29′44″N 7°28′0″E

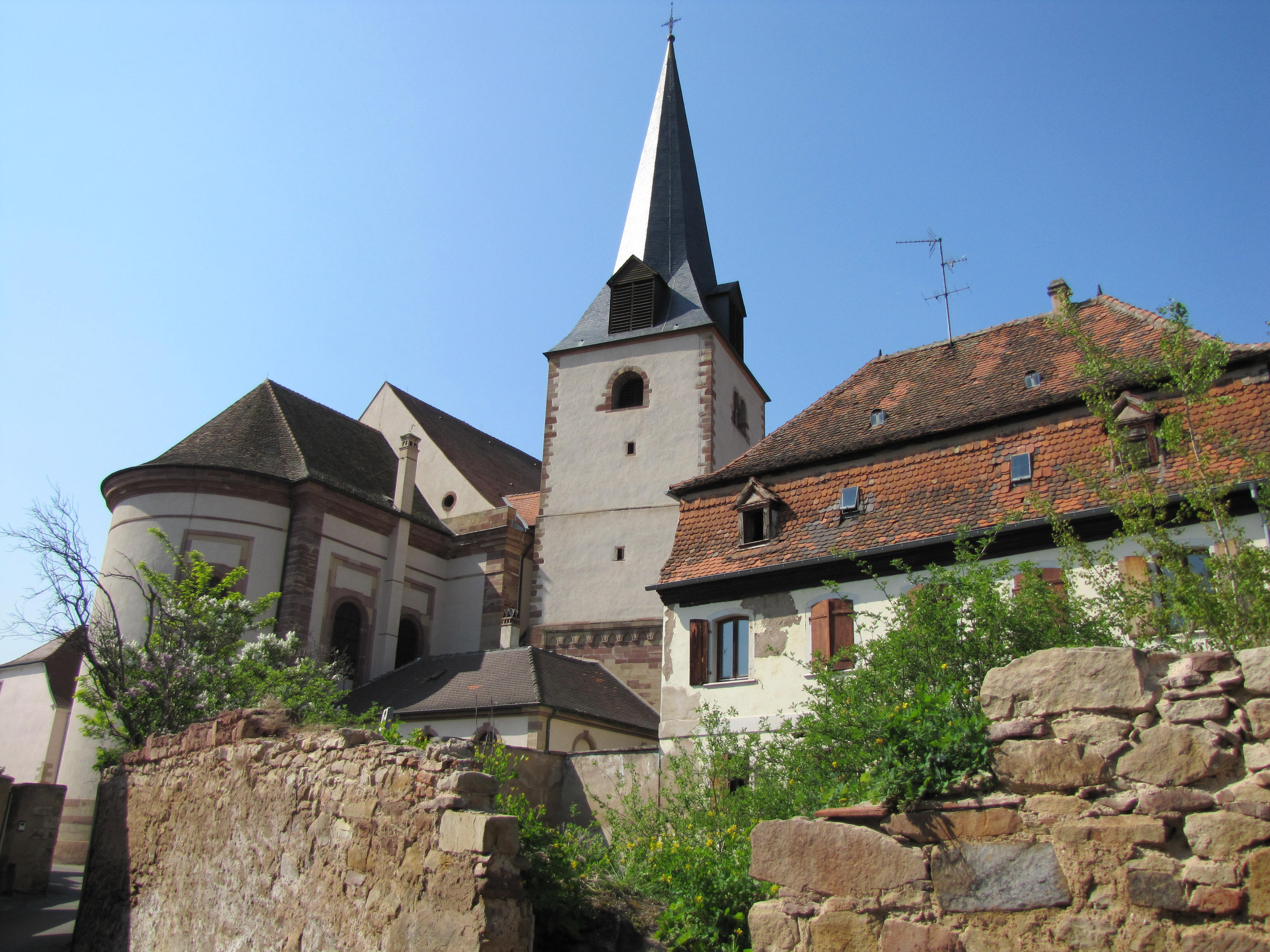
Église Saint-Étienne de Rosheim

Église Saint-Étienne de Rosheim is a church in Rosheim, Bas-Rhin, Alsace, France. Originally built in the 13th century, it was last built in 1788. It became a registered Monument historique in 1990.
