= St. Stephen's School =

St. Stephen's School may refer to one of the following schools or colleges:

== Secondary schools ==
- St. Stephen's School, Chandigarh, India
- St. Stephen's School Rome, Italy
- Saint Stephen's High School, Manila, Philippines
- St. Stephens High School, Hickory, North Carolina, United States
- St. Stephen's Episcopal School (Austin, Texas), United States
- St. Stephen's Episcopal School (Bradenton, Florida), United States
- Tīpene / St Stephen's School, Auckland, New Zealand

== K–12 schools ==
=== Australia ===
- St Stephens School, Brisbane
- St Stephen's School, Perth

=== India ===
- St. Stephen's School, Chandigarh

=== United States ===
- St. Stephen's School, which merged into St. Stephen's & St. Agnes School, Alexandria, Virginia
- St. Stephen's Armenian Elementary School, Watertown, Massachusetts
- St. Stephen's Episcopal School (Austin, Texas)
- Saint Stephen's Episcopal School (Bradenton, Florida)
- St. Stephen's Episcopal School Houston, Texas

== Primary schools ==
=== England ===
- St Stephen's School, Twickenham
- St Stephen's School (Shepherd's Bush)

=== Elsewhere ===
- St. Stephen's Elementary School, Halifax, Nova Scotia, Canada
- Saint Stephen's School, Singapore

== See also ==
- St. Stephen's College (disambiguation)
- Stephens High School, Arkansas, U.S.
