= Santo Estêvão, Bahia =

Municipality of Bahia State, Brazil

Santo Estêvão, Bahia, Brazil
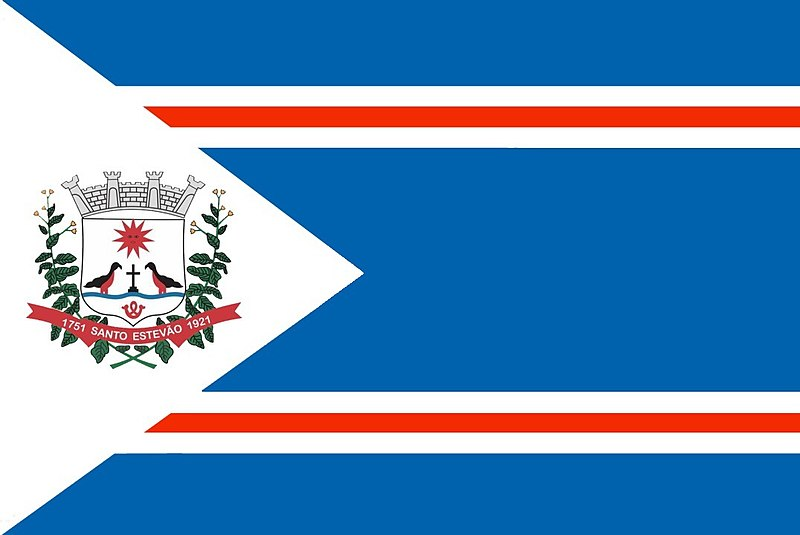
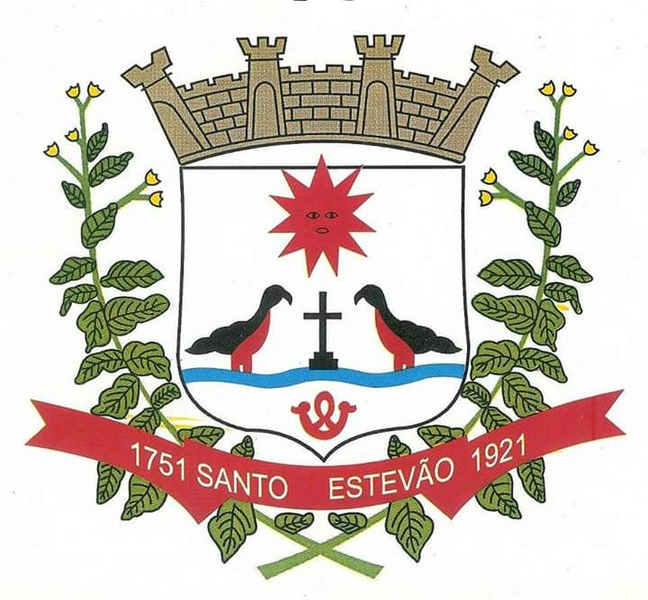
- Flag Seal

- Coordinates: 12°25′48″S 39°15′03″W
- Region: Nordeste
- State: Bahia
- Founded: 12 July 1921
- Elevation: 242 m (794 ft)

Population (2020)
  - Total: 53,269
- Time zone: UTC−3 (BRT)
- Postal code: 2928802

Santo Estêvão is a municipality in the state of Bahia in the North-East region of Brazil.

== See also ==
- List of municipalities in Bahia
