= Église Saint-Étienne de Seltz =

Church in Bas-Rhin, France

Coordinates: 48°53′37″N 8°6′28″E

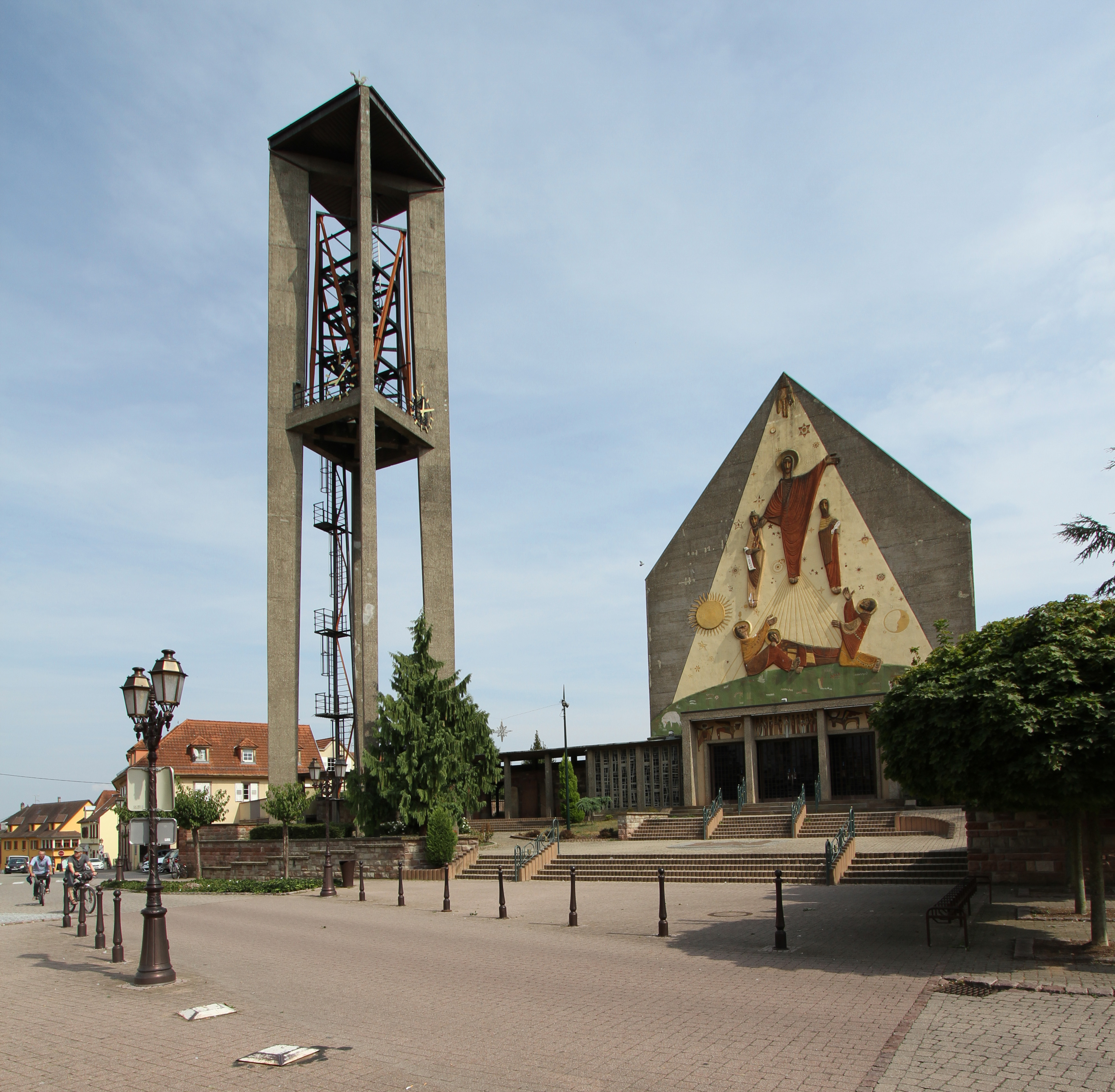
Église Saint-Étienne de Seltz

Église Saint-Étienne de Seltz is a church in Seltz, Bas-Rhin, Alsace, France. Originally built in the late 15th century, it was bombed during World War II and subsequently built between 1954 and 1956. It became a registered Monument historique in 1990.

== History ==
The parish of Saint-Étienne dates from the Merovingian period. The church was built in the 14th century to replace the first one, built in the plain on the banks of the Sauer, which had been washed away by a flood. The new church was built on a rocky promontory above the Rhine Valley. It was subsequently reworked in the 15th, 16th, 19th and 20th centuries and retains some medieval features including the choir, the sacristy and two chapels. The nave, which was destroyed in 1940, was probably built in the 14th century. During the reconstruction of the nave after World War II, Romanesque foundations were discovered.

In 1481, Pope Sixtus IV had the property of the former abbey of Saints Peter and Paul transferred to the parish church of Saint Stephen, which then housed a college of twelve canons. The building undergoes transformations at the end of the 15th - early 16th century. The sacristy probably dates from this period, as does the choir. The chapel of Sainte-Adélaïde probably dates from the first quarter of the 16th century; the Fleckenstein funeral chapel from the first half of the 16th century.

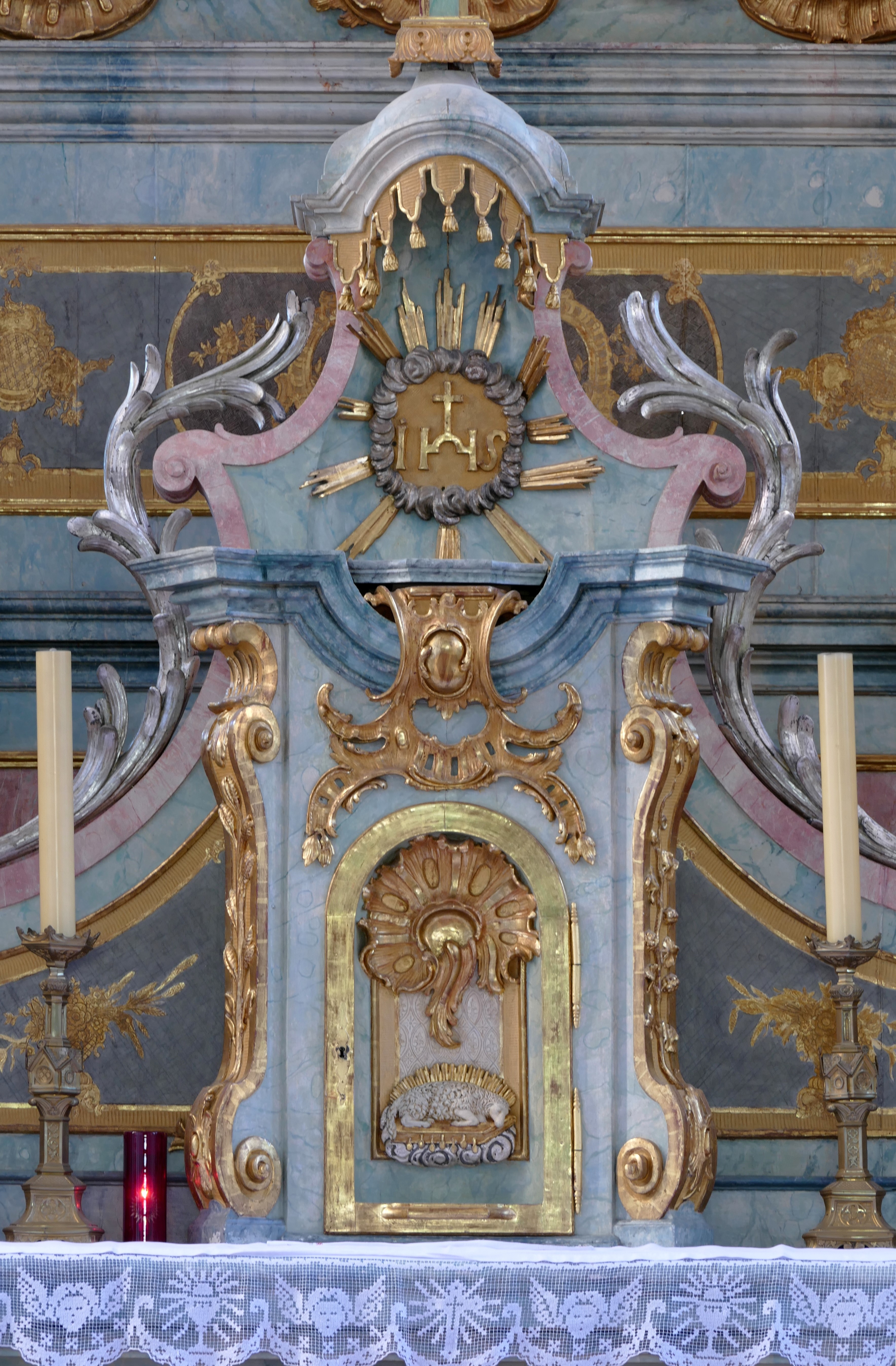
Tabernacle, Main Altar

The church passed to Protestant control from 1557 to 1682. In 1682, Louis XIV gave Seltz to the Jesuits. Between 1898 and 1900 the church was enlarged with a span and a new bell tower porch built in the center of the west gable wall. It was destroyed during the bombings of 1940. The old church had three aisles: a central aisle and two side aisles, which were destroyed. The choir and two side chapels remain, as well as the sacristy which was surmounted by a chapter house on the first floor. A photograph dating from before 1940 shows five bays for the nave. Niches in the buttresses housed statues of saints. Prior to the 1898-1900 work, the west gable wall of the church had two or three doors and was flanked in the northwest corner of the nave by a bell tower, visible on Sandmann's 1839 lithograph.

On May 28, 1940, the church was bombed, the porch tower was destroyed, only the choir, the first floor of the sacristy, the side chapels, part of the walls of the nave and the side aisles as well as the gable wall and the east wall of the porch tower remained. The vaults of the nave and part of the collateral walls were destroyed.

== Restoration ==
The reconstruction took place between 1954 and 1958, according to the plans of the architect Jean Viallefond and the help of the architect Schech from Bischheim. The firm of Sutter et Compagnie from Seltz built the new building. The choir and two chapels have been preserved and restored. The nave and the separate campanile were built of reinforced concrete supporting a wooden ceiling.

The aisles are connected to the entrance porch. The bell tower is insulated and houses several bells installed on September 30, 1962, including a surviving 2.5 ton drone from the old church named Adelaide offered by the German Emperor Wilhelm in 1899. The west gable is decorated with a large relief composition representing the Transfiguration, made in concrete by Lambert-Rucki.

It was consecrated on June 21, 1964.

In September 1968, Schwenkedel installed a new organ to replace the Stiehr-Mockers (famous organ builders of Seltz) which had been destroyed in 1940.
