= Saint-Étienne-de-Serre =

- Commune
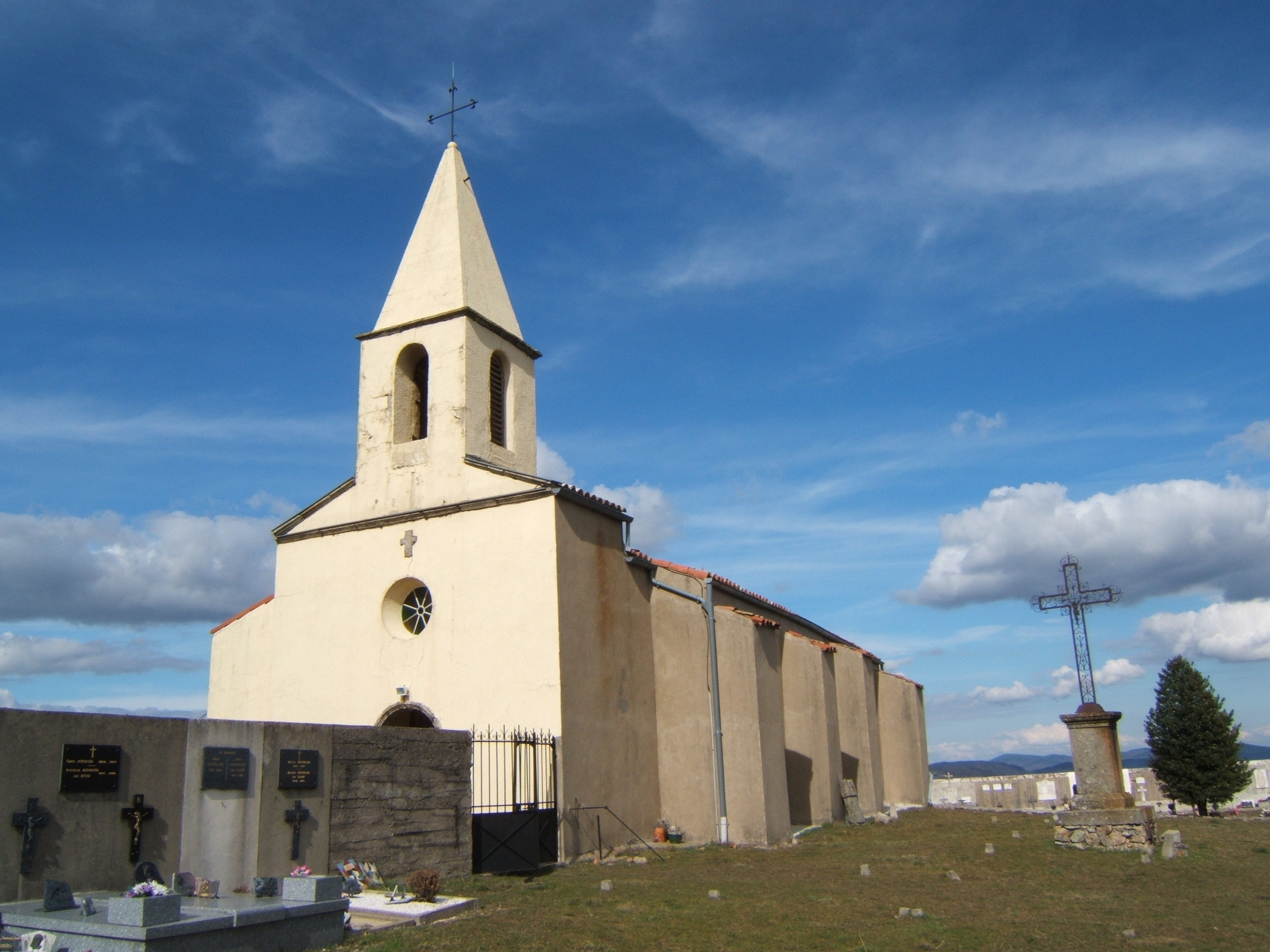
- The church in Saint-Étienne-de-Serre
- Location of Saint-Étienne-de-Serre
- Location within France Location within Auvergne-Rhône-Alpes
- Coordinates: 44°48′08″N 4°32′28″E
- Country: France
- Region: Auvergne-Rhône-Alpes
- Department: Ardèche
- Arrondissement: Privas
- Canton: Haut-Eyrieux
- Intercommunality: CA Privas Centre Ardèche

Government
  - Mayor (2020–2026): Jérôme Coste
- Area^{1}: 16.52 km^{2} (6.38 sq mi)
- Elevation: 550 m (1,800 ft)
- Highest elevation: 974 m (3,196 ft)
- Lowest elevation: 271 m (889 ft)
- Population (2023): 230
  - Density: 14/km^{2} (36/sq mi)
- Time zone: UTC+01:00 (CET)
  - Summer (DST): UTC+02:00 (CEST)
- INSEE/Postal code: 07233 /07190
- ^{1} French Land Register data, which excludes lakes, ponds, glaciers > 1 km^{2} (0.386 sq mi or 247 acres) and river estuaries.

Saint-Étienne-de-Serre (French pronunciation: [sɛ̃.t‿etjɛn də sɛʁ]; Vivaro-Alpine: Sant Estève de Serre) is a commune in the Ardèche department in southern France.

== Population ==
Historical population
Year	Pop.	±% p.a.
1968	317	—
1975	254	−3.12%
1982	192	−3.92%
1990	186	−0.40%
1999	172	−0.87%
2007	205	+2.22%
2012	217	+1.14%
2017	221	+0.37%
2023	230	+0.67%
Source: INSEE

== See also ==
- Communes of the Ardèche department
