= Saint Stephens, Nebraska =

Unincorporated community in Nebraska, U.S.

Coordinates: 40°15′13″N 98°15′22″W

Saint Stephens is an unincorporated community in Nuckolls County, Nebraska, United States.

== History ==
A post office called Saint Stephen operated between 1881 and 1887. It was one of the first post offices established in Nuckolls County.Saint Stephens was once home to one of the earliest Roman Catholic organizations in Nebraska
