= Saint Stephen (disambiguation) =

Saint Stephen (c. AD 5 – c. 34) was the first Christian martyr.

Saint Stephen or St. Stephen may also refer to:

== Saints ==
- Pope Stephen I (died 257), bishop of Rome from 254 to 257
- Socrates and Stephen (died c. 307), martyrs
- Saint Ysteffan, credited as the founder of Llansteffan in Wales
- Stephen the Younger (died 764), Byzantine monk from Constantinople and iconodule martyr
- Stephen the Sabaite (725–796/807), Byzantine hymnographer and monk
- Stephen I of Hungary (c. 975–1038), first king of Hungary (r. 1000–1038)

=== Eastern Orthodox ===
- Stephen of Perm (1340–1396), Russian monk and apostle of the Permians
- Stephen of Dečani (c. 1276–1331), King of Serbia (r. 1322–1331) and martyr who founded the Monastery of Visoki Dečani
- Stephen the Tall (c. 1377–1427), Despot of Serbia (r. 1322–1331), diplomat and ktetor
- Stephen the Blind (c. 1417–1476), Despot of Serbia (r. 1458–1459)
- Stephen the Great (died 1504), Prince of Moldavia (r. 1457–1504)
- Stephen Štiljanović (died 1543), Serbian nobleman who was the last Despot of Serbia (r. 1537–1543)
- Stephen of Piperi (died 1697), hegumen of Morača Monastery

=== Roman Catholic ===
- Stephen Harding (c. 1060–1134), co-founder of the Cistercian Order
- Stephen Theodore Cuenot, one of the Vietnamese Martyrs
- Stephen Vinh, one of the Vietnamese Martyrs

== Places ==
=== Canada ===
- St. Stephen, New Brunswick
  - Saint Stephen Parish, New Brunswick, a civil parish

=== United Kingdom ===
- St Stephen-in-Brannel, Cornwall
- St Stephen, Hertfordshire
- St Stephens (ward), an electoral ward for Newham London Borough Council, Greater London

=== United States ===
- St. Stephen, Minnesota
- St. Stephen, South Carolina

== Other uses ==
- St. Stephen's Church (disambiguation)
- "St. Stephen" (song) by the Grateful Dead, 1970
- SMS Szent István (St. Stephen), an Austro-Hungarian battleship

== See also ==
- Saint Étienne (disambiguation)
- San Esteban (disambiguation)
- Santo Estêvão (disambiguation)
- St. Stephens (disambiguation)
- Order of Saint Stephen, a Roman Catholic Tuscan dynastic military order
- Order of Saint Stephen of Hungary, an order of chivalry
- Hungarian Order of Saint Stephen, a state honour
