= Church of San Esteban (Segovia) =

Tower of San Esteban
- Torre de San Esteban (Spanish)
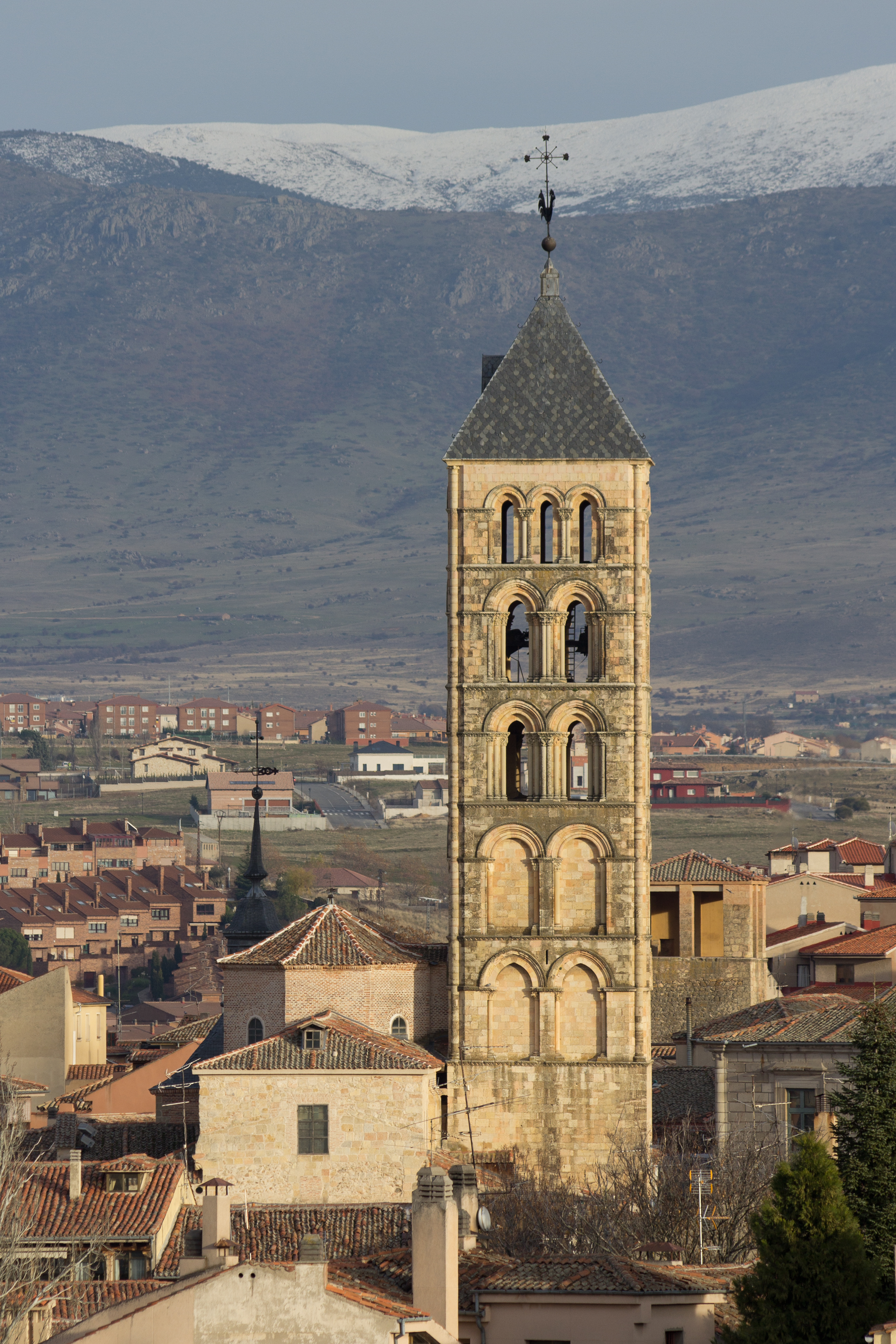

- Location within Spain
- 40.951902°N 4.124814°W
- Location: Segovia, Spain

Site notes
- Architectural style: Spanish Romanesque

Spanish Cultural Heritage
- Official name: Torre de San Esteban
- Type: Non-movable
- Criteria: Monument
- Designated: 1896
- Reference no.: RI-51-0000075

The Church of St Stephen (Spanish: Iglesia de San Esteban) is one of a number of medieval churches in Segovia, Spain. It dates from the 12th century and is noted for its Romanesque bell tower.

== Conservation ==
The tower is designated a Bien de Interés Cultural and has been protected since 1896, when it was declared a National Monument (published in the Madrid Gazette on 13 December 1896).

Since 1985 the church has been part of a World Heritage Site: the Old Town of Segovia and its Aqueduct. In giving this designation to Segovia, UNESCO noted that the outstanding monuments of the city included "several Romanesque churches".
