= St. Stephen's College =

St. Stephen's College may refer to:

- St. Stephen's College, Balla Balla, Southern Rhodesia (later: Rhodesia)
- St Stephen's College, Broadstairs, England
- Tīpene / St Stephen's School, Bombay Hills, New Zealand
- St. Stephen's College, Edmonton, affiliated with the University of Alberta, Canada
- St. Stephen's College, Delhi, India
- St Stephen's College (Hong Kong), in Stanley, Hong Kong
- St. Stephen's Girls' College in Sai Ying Pun, Hong Kong
- St. Stephen's Church College in Sai Ying Pun, Hong Kong
- Saint Stephen's College in Queensland, Australia
- St. Stephen's College, New York, now Bard College

== See also ==
- St. Stephen's School (disambiguation)
