= Saint-Étienne-la-Cigogne =

- Part of Plaine-d'Argenson
- Location of Saint-Étienne-la-Cigogne
- Location within France Location within Nouvelle-Aquitaine
- Coordinates: 46°06′56″N 0°29′15″W
- Country: France
- Region: Nouvelle-Aquitaine
- Department: Deux-Sèvres
- Arrondissement: Niort
- Canton: Mignon-et-Boutonne
- Commune: Plaine-d'Argenson
- Area^{1}: 4.82 km^{2} (1.86 sq mi)
- Elevation: 61 m (200 ft)
- Highest elevation: 70 m (230 ft)
- Lowest elevation: 39 m (128 ft)
- Population (2019): 159
  - Density: 33.0/km^{2} (85.4/sq mi)
- Time zone: UTC+01:00 (CET)
  - Summer (DST): UTC+02:00 (CEST)
- Postal code: 79360
- ^{1} French Land Register data, which excludes lakes, ponds, glaciers > 1 km^{2} (0.386 sq mi or 247 acres) and river estuaries.

Saint-Étienne-la-Cigogne (French pronunciation: [sɛ̃.t‿etjɛn la siɡɔɲ]) is a former commune in the Deux-Sèvres department in western France. On 1 January 2018, it was merged into the new commune of Plaine-d'Argenson.

== See also ==
- Communes of the Deux-Sèvres department
