= Church of San Esteban (Ábalos) =

Historic church in Ábalos, La Rioja, Spain

- Iglesia Parroquial de San Esteban (Spanish)
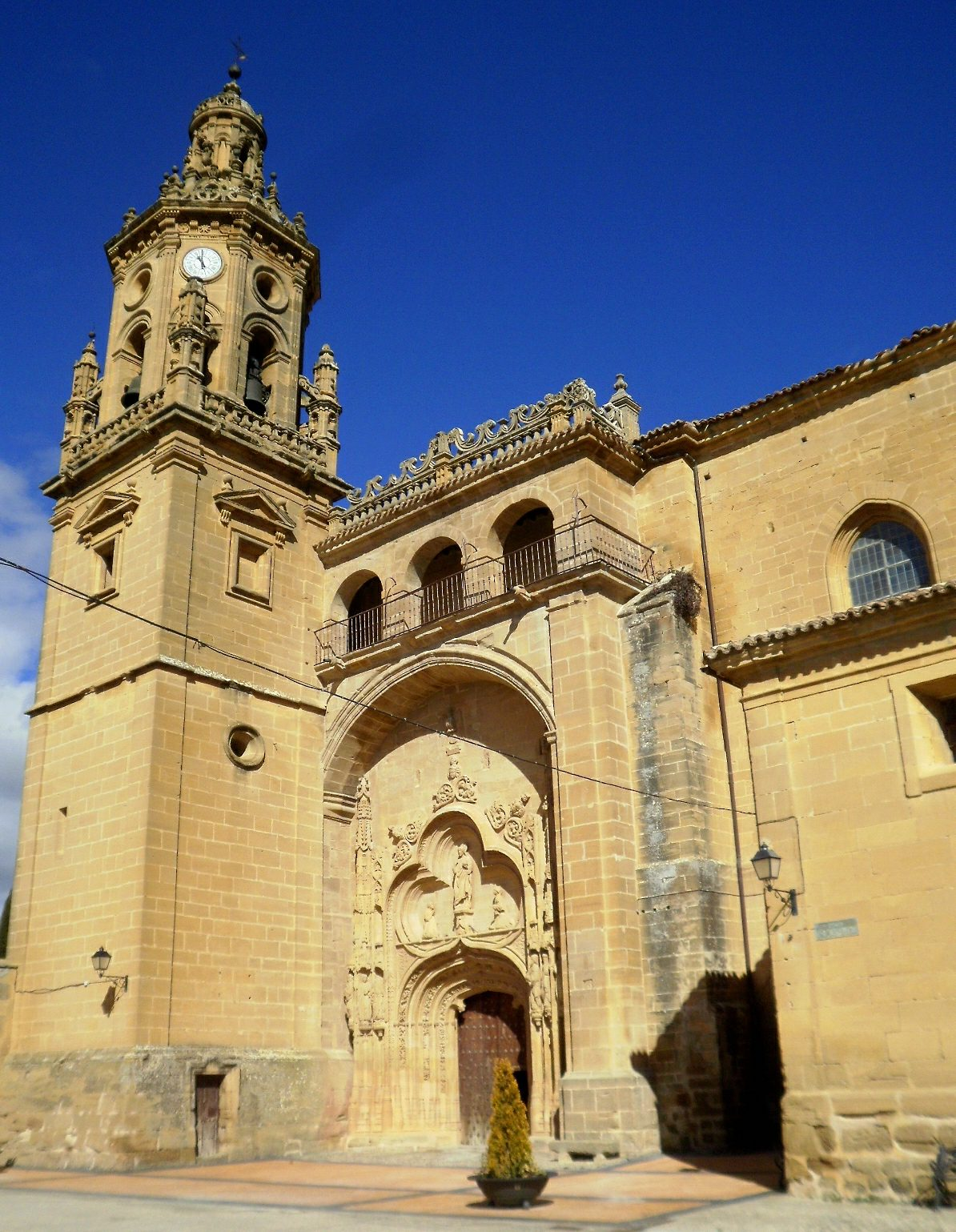

- Location within Spain
- 42.5736°N 2.7108°W
- Location: Ábalos, La Rioja, Spain

Spanish Cultural Heritage
- Official name: Iglesia Parroquial de San Esteban
- Type: Non-movable
- Criteria: Monument
- Designated: 1973
- Reference no.: RI-51-0003918

The Church of San Esteban (Spanish: Iglesia Parroquial de San Esteban) is a church located in Ábalos, La Rioja, Spain. It was declared Bien de Interés Cultural in 1973.
