= St. Stephen's Church, San Salvador =

Old catholic church in San Salvador, El Salvador

Coordinates: 13.6974°N 89.1859°W

St. Stephen's Church (Iglesia San Esteban) is a historic Roman Catholic church in downtown San Salvador, El Salvador. It belongs to the Roman Catholic Archdiocese of San Salvador and its patron saint is the protomartyr, Saint Stephen. Built 1880–1890, it was heavily damaged during the January 2001 and February 2001 El Salvador earthquakes, and is currently closed pending repairs. At the time of its construction, the church's building materials, imported from Belgium, were widely admired by 19th-century residents of San Salvador.

The church is one of the important churches of San Salvador, having a key role in the "semana santa" (Holy Week) celebrations of San Salvador. The Church marks the start of "The Road of Bitterness" (la Calle de la Amargura), El Salvador's analog of the Via Dolorosa, over which the Good Friday Via Crucis procession makes its way, to the destination Church "El Calvario." The two churches mark the vertical axis of a giant cross formed over the Salvadoran capital with its horizontal axis formed by a third church, La Vega, and the Metropolitan Cathedral.
