= Church of San Esteban (Ciaño) =

Coordinates: 43.28853°N 5.667942°W

Iglesia de San Esteban (Ciaño)
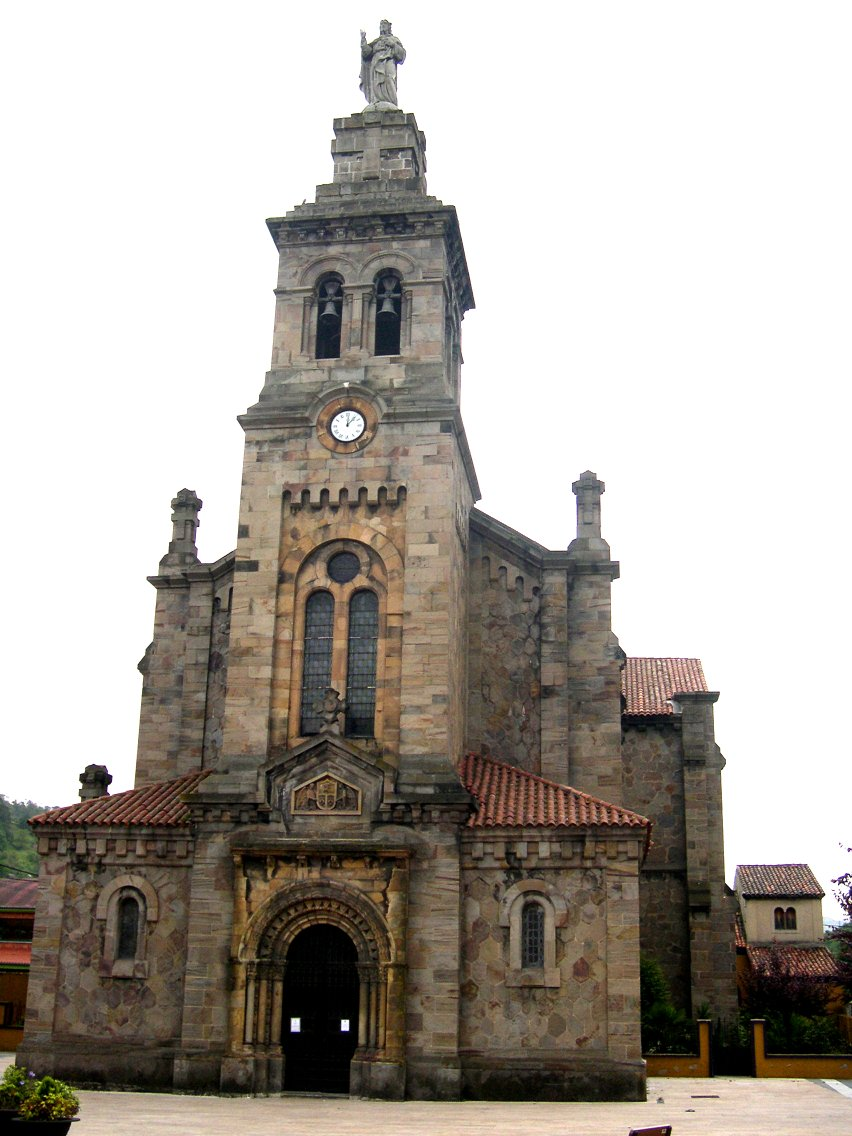
- Iglesia de San Esteban (Ciaño)
- Location: Asturias, Spain

Iglesia de San Esteban (Ciaño) is a Romanesque church in Asturias, Spain. It was constructed between the late 12th to 13th century.
