= Church of San Esteban (Murillo de Río Leza) =

- Iglesia Parroquial de San Esteban (Spanish)
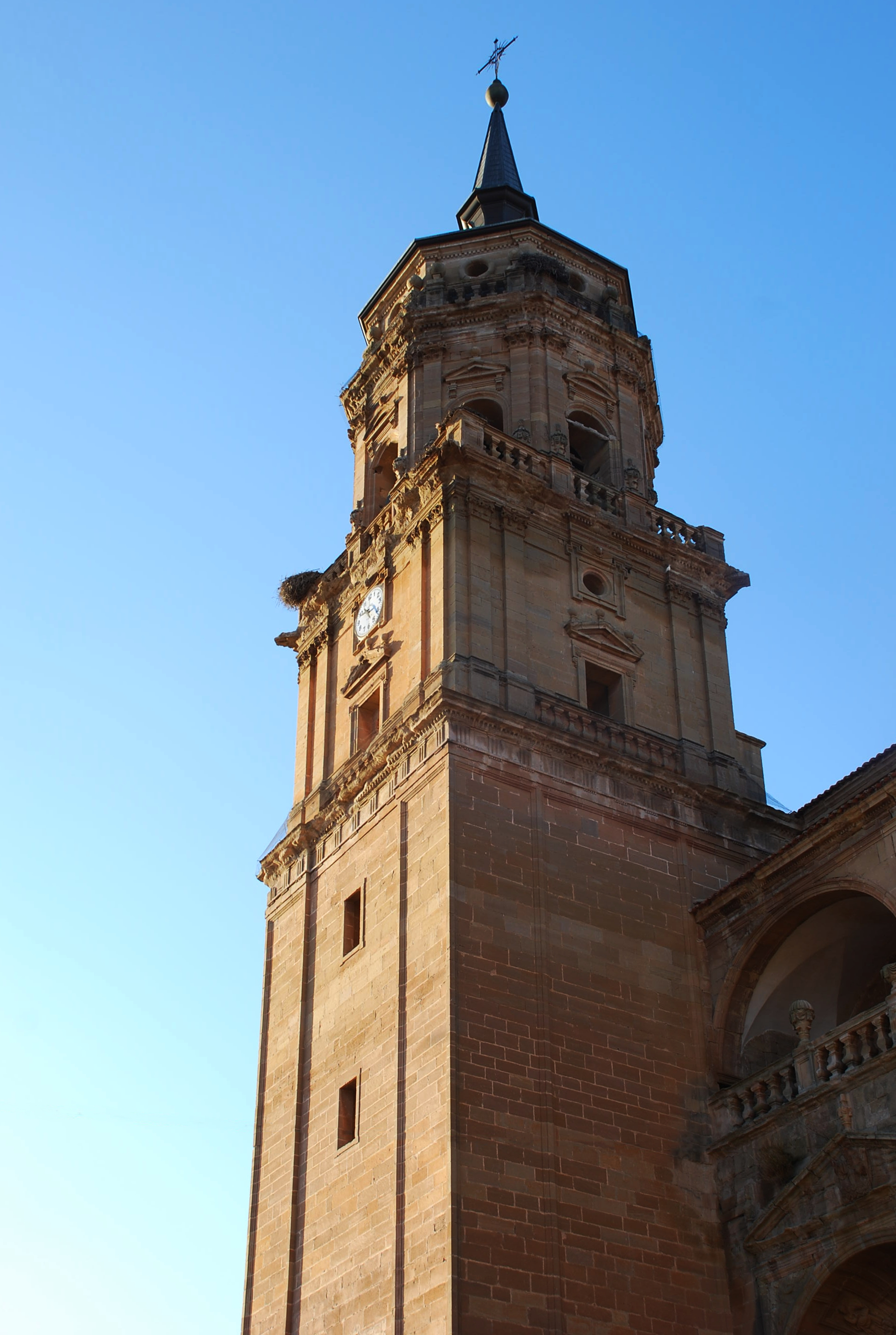

- Location within La Rioja, Spain Location within Spain
- 42.403819°N 2.325712°W
- Location: Murillo de Río Leza, La Rioja, Spain

Spanish Cultural Heritage
- Official name: Iglesia Parroquial de San Esteban
- Type: Non-movable
- Criteria: Monument
- Designated: 1979
- Reference no.: RI-51-0004336

The Church of San Esteban (Spanish: Iglesia Parroquial de San Esteban Protomártir) is a church located in Murillo de Río Leza, Spain. It was declared a national monument in 1979, and Bien de Interés Cultural on 2 February 1983. The patron saint of the church is Saint Stephen the Protomartyr.
