= San Esteban (Morcín) =

- Parish
- Location within Spain
- Coordinates: 43.283333°N 4.65°W
- Country: Spain
- Autonomous community: Asturias
- Province: Asturias
- Municipality: Morcín

Population
  - Total: 240

San Esteban is one of seven parishes (administrative divisions) in Morcín, a municipality within the province and autonomous community of Asturias, in northern Spain.

== Villages ==
- Castandiello
- El Palacio
- Peñanes
- La Roza
- Rozadas
- Villar
- San Esteban
