= Église Saint-Étienne de Boofzheim =

Church in Boofzheim, France

Coordinates: 48°19′55″N 7°40′59″E

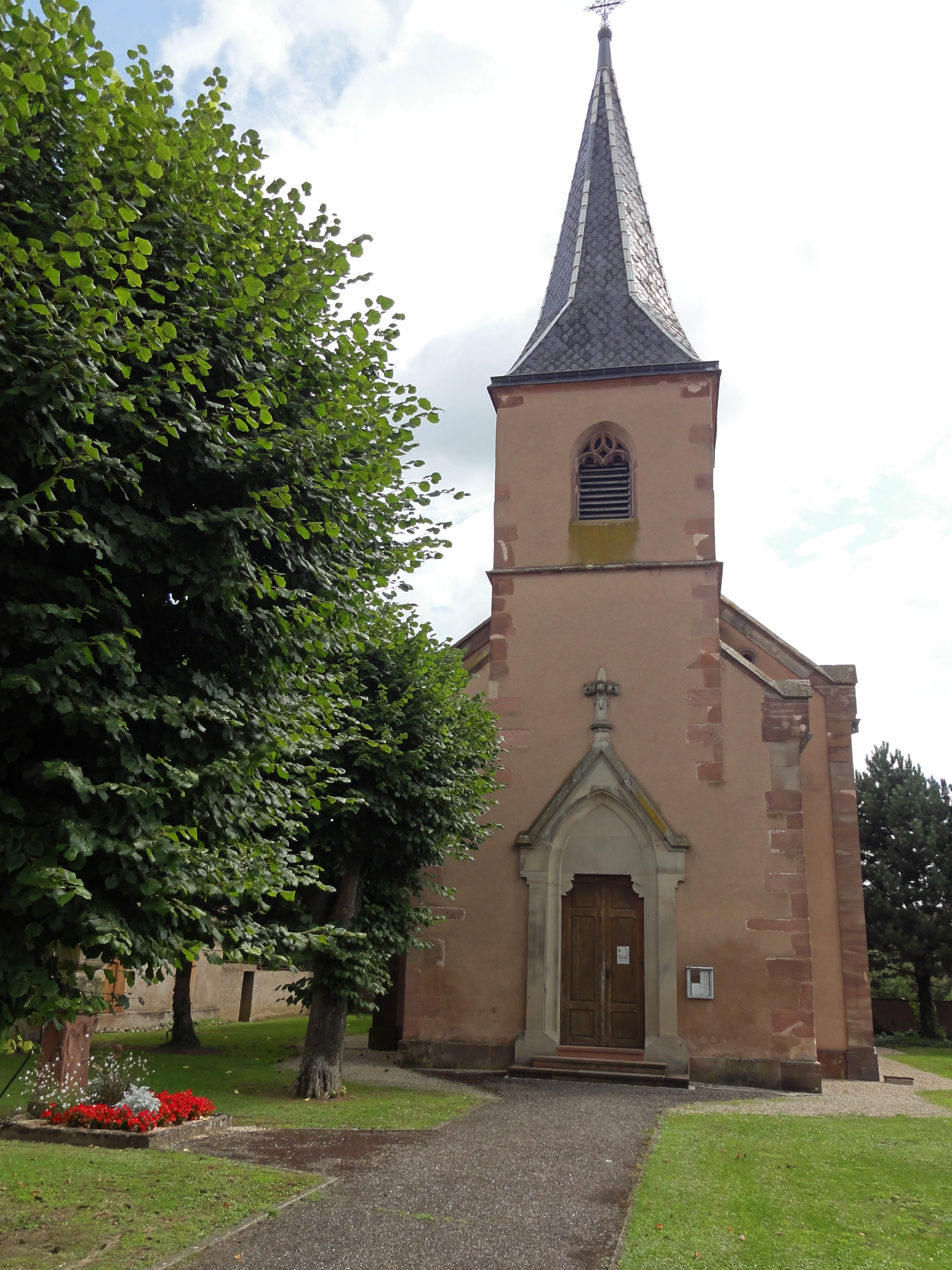
Église Saint-Étienne de Boofzheim

Église Saint-Étienne de Boofzheim is a church in Boofzheim, Bas-Rhin, Alsace, France. Built in 1516, and then 1608 and 1684, it became a registered Monument historique in 1935.
