= Saint-Étienne Church (Entrammes) =

Church in Entrammes, France

Coordinates: 47°59′48″N 0°42′45″W

Saint-Étienne Church Église Saint-Étienne d'Entrammes
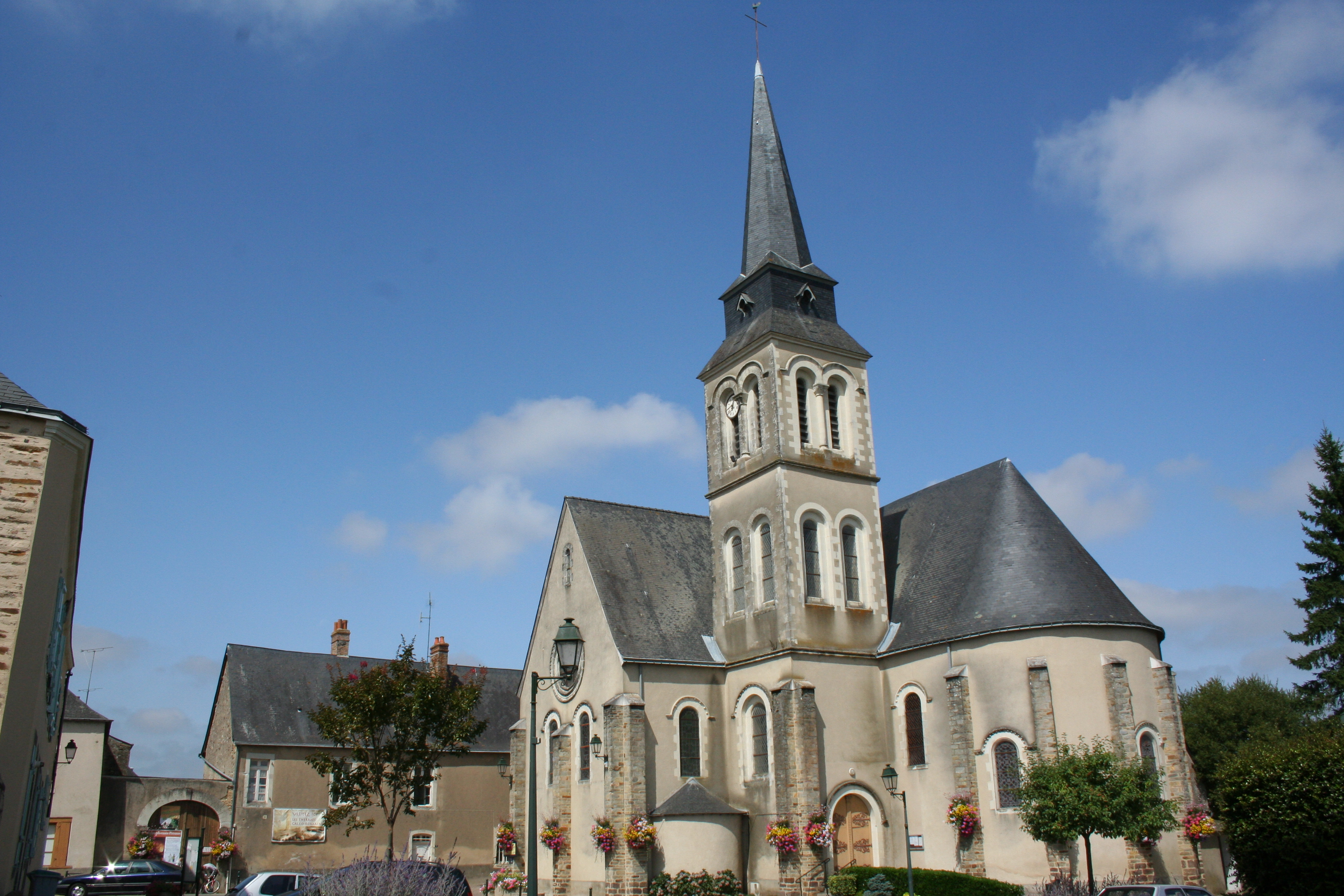
- Façade of the church

Religion
- Affiliation: Roman Catholic
- Status: Active

Location
- Location: Principal Square, Entrammes, France
- Interactive map of Saint-Étienne Church; Église Saint-Étienne d'Entrammes

Architecture
- Type: Church
- Groundbreaking: 7th century

The Saint-Étienne Church (French: Église Saint-Étienne d'Entrammes) is a church in Entrammes, Mayenne, France.

== History ==
A church was first built in the 7th century on the remains of Roman baths, which were rediscovered in 1987.

Today, little remains of the old Paleo-Christian church save for a staircase that leads to the chancel and the base of the pulpit.

== Gallery ==
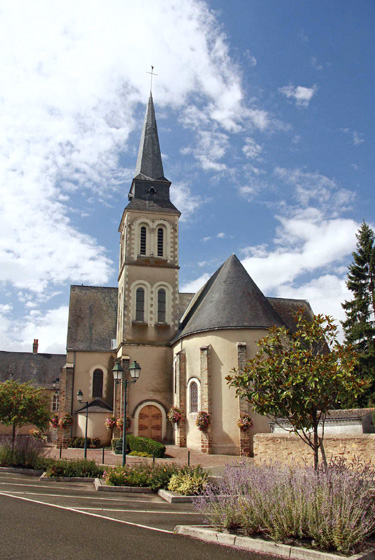
The church in Spring

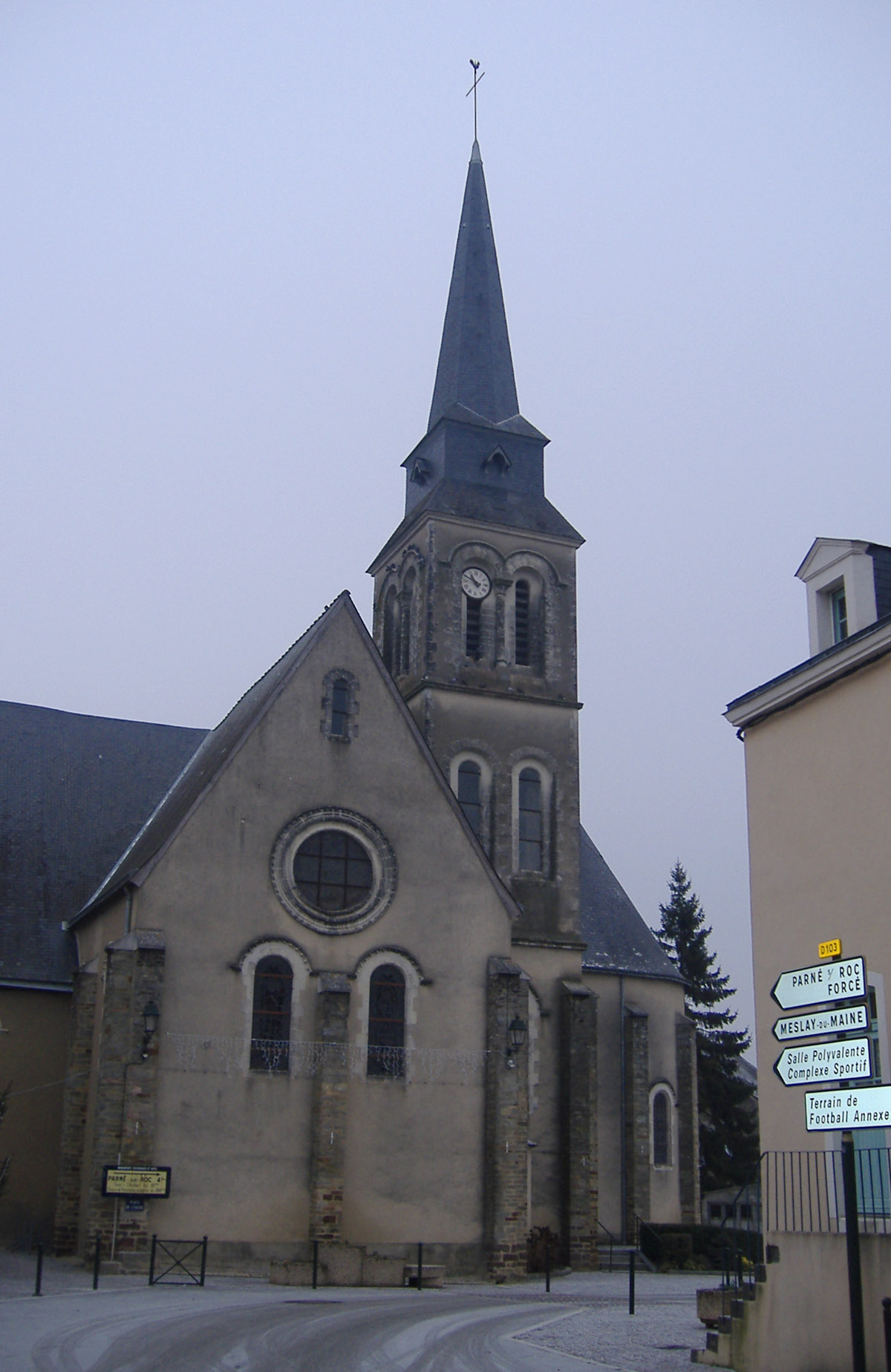
The church in Winter
