= St. Stephen's Church =

St. Stephen's Church, or Saint Stephen Church or variations, may refer to:

== Armenia ==
- Saint Stephen Church of Lmbat Monastery, Artik, Shirak Province
- Saint Stephen Church of Abovyan, Kotayk Province

== Australia ==
- Old St Stephen's Church, Brisbane, Queensland
- St. Stephen's, Kellyville, New South Wales, see List of Anglican churches in the Diocese of Sydney
- St Stephen's Church, Ipswich, Queensland
- St. Stephen's Church, Penrith, New South Wales
- St Stephen's Anglican Church, Newtown, New South Wales
- St. Stephen's Anglican Church, Wynyard, Tasmania
- St Stephen's Anglican Church, Toodyay, Western Australia
- St Stephen's Lutheran Church, Adelaide, South Australia
- St Stephen's Presbyterian Church, Jamberoo, New South Wales
- St Stephen's Presbyterian Church and Manse, Queanbeyan, New South Wales
- St Stephen's Uniting Church, Sydney, New South Wales

== Austria ==
- St. Stephen's Cathedral, Vienna
- St. Stephan, Baden

== Belgium ==
- St. Stefanus, Ghent
- Saints John's and Stephen's of the Minims, Brussels

== Canada ==
- St. Stephen's Church, St. Stephen, New Brunswick
- St. Stephen's Catholic Church, North Vancouver, where Pierre Trudeau and Margaret Sinclair were married
- St. Stephen's Anglican Church (Buckingham, Quebec)
- St. Stephen's Anglican Church (Chambly, Quebec)
- St. Stephen's Anglican Church (Ottawa)
- St. Stephen's Anglican Church, Calgary, AB
- St. Stephen’s Anglican Church, Saanichton, BC

== Cyprus ==
- Sourp Stepanos Armenian Church of Larnaca

== Czech Republic ==
- St. Stephen's Church, Prague

== El Salvador ==
- St. Stephen's Church, San Esteban, San Salvador

== France ==
- Saint Stephen’s Church, Strasbourg

== Georgia (country) ==
- Church of Saint Stephen, Stephanopolis (undisclosed location), Lazica

== Germany ==
- St. Stephen's Abbey, Augsburg
- St. Stephan, Mainz
- St. Stephan, Munich

== India ==
- St. Stephen's Church, Delhi
- St. Stephen's Church, Kombuthurai
- St. Stephen's Church, Ootacamund

== Iran ==
- Saint Stepanos Monastery, Armenian Monastery of St. Stephen the Protomartyr

== Ireland ==
- St Stephen's Church, Dublin

== Israel ==
- St. Stephen's Church, Beit Jimal - traditional site of the saint's initial burial; monastery

== The Netherlands ==
- Saint Stephen's Church, Nijmegen

== Poland ==
- St. Stephen's Church, Katowice

== Russia ==
- Saint Stephen Armenian Church of Kaliningrad

== Singapore ==
- Church of St. Stephen, Singapore, a Catholic church in MacPherson, Singapore

== Slovakia ==
- Church of St Stephen the King, Bratislava

== Spain ==
- St. Stephen's Church, Valencia

== Sri Lanka ==
- Saint Stephen's Church, Negombo

== Turkey ==
- Bulgarian St. Stephen Church
- St. Stepanos Church, Smyrna (now İzmir), destroyed in 1922

== United Kingdom ==
=== England ===
- St Stephen's Church, St Albans
- St Stephen's Church, Acomb
- St Stephen's Church, Bath
- Church of St Stephen on-the-Cliffs, Blackpool
- St Stephen's Church, Brighton
- St Stephen's Church, Bristol
- St Stephen's Church, Bournemouth
- St Stephen Coleman Street, a ruined church in the City of London
- St Stephen's Church, Copley
- St Stephen's Church, Ealing
- Old St Stephen's Church, Fylingdales, North Yorkshire
- St Paul and St Stephen's Church, Gloucester
- St Stephen and All Martyrs' Church, Lever Bridge, Greater Manchester
- St Stephen's Church, Gateacre, Liverpool
- St Stephen's Church, Great Haywood, Staffordshire
- St Stephen's Church, Low Elswick
- St Stephen's Church, Moulton, Cheshire
- St Stephen's Church, Norwich
- St Stephen's Church, Rosslyn Hill
- Church of St Stephen, Saltash
- St Stephen's Church, Selly Park
- St Stephen's Church, Shepherd's Bush, London
- St Stephen's Church, Sneinton, Nottinghamshire
- St Stephen's Church, Tonbridge, Kent
- St Stephen's, Twickenham, London
- St Stephen Walbrook, City of London
- St Stephen's Church, Whelley, Greater Manchester
- St Alban and St Stephen's Church, St Albans

=== Scotland ===
- St Stephen's Church, Edinburgh
- Old High St Stephen's, Inverness

=== Wales ===
- Church of St Stephen, Ystrad Rhondda
- St Stephen's Church, Cardiff
- St Stephen's Church, Old Radnor, Powys

=== Isle of Man ===
- St Stephens Church and former School Room, Sulby, Lezayre, Isle of Man, one of Isle of Man's Registered Buildings

== United States ==
(ordered by state and city)

- St. Stephen's Church (Chicago, Illinois), located in Hyde Park; formerly the Tenth Church of Christ, Scientist
- St. Stephen's Episcopal Church (Newton, Iowa), listed on the National Register of Historic Places (NRHP) in Jasper County
- St. Stephen Church in Louisville, Kentucky, has the largest African American congregation in Kentucky
- St. Stephen's Church (Boston, Massachusetts), listed on the NRHP
- St. Stephen's Memorial Episcopal Church, Lynn, Massachusetts, listed on the NRHP
- Church of Saint Stephen (Minneapolis, Minnesota)
- St. Stephen's Church (New Hartford, New York), listed on the NRHP in Oneida County
- St. Stephen's Mar Thoma Church, East Brunswick, New Jersey
- St. Stephan's Church (Ironbound, Newark, New Jersey)
- St. Stephen's Catholic Church (Cleveland, Ohio)
- St. Stephen's Church (Bradys Bend, Pennsylvania), listed on the NRHP
- S. Stephen's Church (Providence, Rhode Island), listed on the NRHP
- St. Stephen's Lutheran Church (South Carolina)
- St. Stephen's Church (Heathsville, Virginia), listed on the NRHP
- Saint Stephen Martyr Catholic Church (Washington, D.C.)
- Saint Stephen Evangelical Lutheran Church of Milwaukee, Wisconsin

== Vatican City ==
- St. Stephen of the Abyssinians (Santo Stefano degli Abissini), Vatican City

== Fictional ==
- St. Stephen's Church, Ambridge, the fictional church in The Archers.

== See also ==
- Church of St. Stephen Harding (disambiguation)
- St. Stephen's Episcopal Church (disambiguation)
- St. Stephen's Cathedral (disambiguation)
- Saint Étienne (disambiguation)#Churches
