= St. Stephen's Episcopal Church =

St. Stephen's Episcopal Church, or variants thereof, may refer to:

in the United States

(by state then city/town)

- Grace and St. Stephen's Episcopal Church (Colorado Springs, Colorado), listed on the National Register of Historic Places (NRHP)
- St. Stephen's Episcopal Church (Longmont, Colorado), listed on the NRHP
- St. Stephen's Episcopal Church (Newton, Iowa), listed on the NRHP
- St. Stephen's Episcopal Church (Innis, Louisiana), listed on the NRHP
- St. Stephen's Episcopal Church (Earleville, Maryland), listed on the NRHP
- St. Stephen's Episcopal Church (Batesville, Mississippi), one of Mississippi's Landmarks
- St. Stephen's Episcopal Church (Ashland, Nebraska), listed on the NRHP
- St. Stephen's Episcopal Church (Beverly, New Jersey), listed on the NRHP
- St. Stephen's Episcopal Church (Mullica Hill, New Jersey). listed on the NRHP
- St. Stephen's Episcopal Church Complex (Olean, New York), listed on the NRHP
- St. Stephen's Episcopal Church (Schuylerville, New York), listed on the NRHP
- St. Stephen's Episcopal Church (Durham, North Carolina)
- St. Stephen's Episcopal Church (Casselton, North Dakota), listed on the NRHP
- St. Stephen's Episcopal Church (Chandler, Oklahoma), listed on the NRHP
- St. Stephen's Episcopal Church, Philadelphia, Pennsylvania, listed on the NRHP
- St. Stephen's Church (Providence, Rhode Island)
- St. Stephen's Episcopal Church (Ridgeway, South Carolina), listed on the NRHP
- St. Stephen's Episcopal Church (St. Stephen, South Carolina), listed on the NRHP
- St. Stephen's Episcopal Church (Charleston, South Carolina)
- St. Stephen's Episcopal Church (Oak Harbor, Washington)

== See also ==
- St. Stephen's Church (disambiguation)
