= St. Thomas Anglican Church (Silver Creek, Quebec) =

St. Thomas Silver Creek
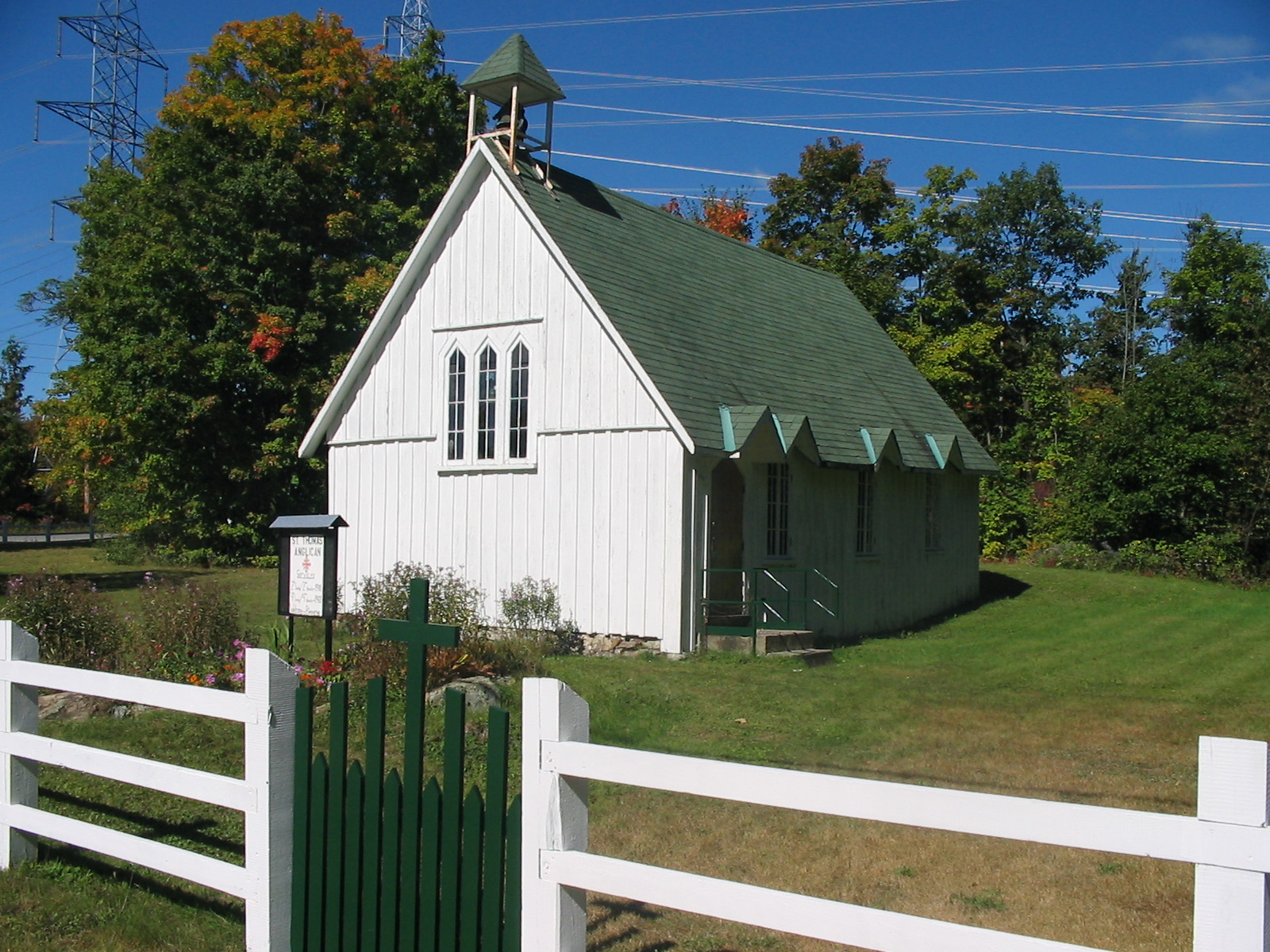
- St. Thomas Silver Creek
- 45.6178°N 75.3499°W
- Location: 1007 Range 5 Ouest, Lochaber-Partie-Ouest, QC J0X 3BO
- Denomination: Anglican Church of Canada

History
- Dedication: 1877; 149 years ago

Administration
- Diocese: Anglican Diocese of Ottawa
- Deanery: West Quebec
- Parish: Eastern Chapels

Patrimoine culturel du Québec
- Official name: Église anglicane Saint-Thomas de Silver Creek
- Type: Recognized heritage building
- Designated: 2022

St. Thomas Anglican Chapel is a historic country church located in Lochaber-Partie-Ouest, Quebec, Canada. Built in 1877, the chapel is a simple, one room log structure with no running water or telephone. Electricity was brought to the facility in the mid-twentieth century and is now used to heat and light the building.

== Chapel history ==
St. Thomas' church began as an outpost congregation of St. Stephen's Anglican Church, Buckingham, Quebec. Under the direction of the Anglican Diocese of Montreal, clergy from Buckingham began making regular Sunday trips to Lochaber by horse and buggy - or sleigh if necessary - in the 1850s and 1860s. Congregations initially gathered in the local school house before the community came together to erect the current structure, which was built primarily of hemlock logs on a lot donated by Joseph C. Storey in 1877. The white board and batten exterior that currently graces the church dates to the early 1900s. Originally denominated St. Thomas’, Lochaber, in keeping with the name of the municipality, the name Silver Creek was given to the congregation in the mid twentieth century, in reference to a nearby body of water that had become synonymous with the small English-speaking community living in close proximity to the church.

The Diocese of Montreal formally transferred responsibility for the Parish of Buckingham, comprising St. Stephen's and St. Thomas', to the Anglican Diocese of Ottawa in the mid-twentieth century. The Diocese of Ottawa continues to administer affairs at St. Thomas' to this day.

Sadly, St. Thomas' storied history has included a number of burglaries and break-ins. In 1995 burglars stole the building's antique windows and all of the church's contents except the altar and the pews. In 2007, burglars again stole all of the church's linens, as well as communion chalices, an antique brass cross, and the church's two Memorial Rolls of Honour for veterans of The First and Second World Wars. In early 2009, the church's antique wooden door was damaged by vandals.

Despite these challenges, the Silver Creek community continues to rally together in support of its "little white church." New windows, lecterns, and an antique pump organ were donated by local Anglicans following the 1995 burglary, and new silverware and linens were donated following the 2007 incident. A hand carved wooden cross made by one of the church's long time members, Ron McDermid, now sits proudly at the front of the church in the place of honour once occupied by its brass predecessor. On November 8, 2009, the congregation formally rededicated two restored Memorial Rolls of Honour with the support of Veterans Affairs Canada and The Royal Canadian Legion. Over 70 people, including many surviving veterans, their families and local political leaders were in attendance for the rededication.

Throughout its history St. Thomas' has maintained a consistent Sunday congregation of approximately 8 to 12 parishioners. Major feasts and special events such as Easter, the Thanksgiving Harvest Festival, and the candlelight Christmas Eve service draw larger groups of worshipers. The church can comfortably seat 45 people and visitors at "The Creek" are always welcome. Local folklore holds that the one room church is considered to be "the church hall" until the ringing of the ceremonial bell at the beginning of every service - at this point the church becomes "the church" and the designated leader begins to lead the service. Following the benediction, dismissal, and a further ringing of the bell, the church reverts to being "the church hall" and becomes a focal point for the discussion of local affairs and upcoming events in the small farming community.

The church was recognized as a heritage building by the municipality of Lochaber-Partie-Ouest in 2022.

== The Chapel today ==
St. Thomas' was designated as a chapel of ease in 2017 and is now one of the Eastern Chapels of the Anglican Diocese of Ottawa within the Deanery of West Quebec. Services are arranged seasonally, in coordination with the territorial archdeacon. The chapel is also available by request for weddings, baptisms, confirmations, funerals, and other special occasions.

== 125th Anniversary Celebration ==
In 2002 St. Thomas celebrated its 125th anniversary as a worshiping congregation. A special outdoor service was held to mark the occasion on Sunday September 7, 2002. The service was led by The Right Reverend Peter Coffin, Bishop of Ottawa, and attended by more than 175 people.

== 135th Anniversary Celebration ==
In 2012 St. Thomas celebrated its 135th anniversary as a worshiping congregation. A special service was held on Sunday September 30, 2012 to mark the occasion. The service was led by The Right Reverend Dr. John Chapman, Bishop of Ottawa, and included the confirmation of three parishioners, followed by a reception at St. Stephen's church hall in Buckingham.

== 145th Anniversary Celebration ==
In 2022 St. Thomas celebrated its 145th anniversary. In addition to a summer Eucharist, a special ceremony was held in the autumn of 2022 to recognize the chapel's designation as a heritage building by the municipality of Lochaber-Partie-Ouest.

== Photo gallery ==
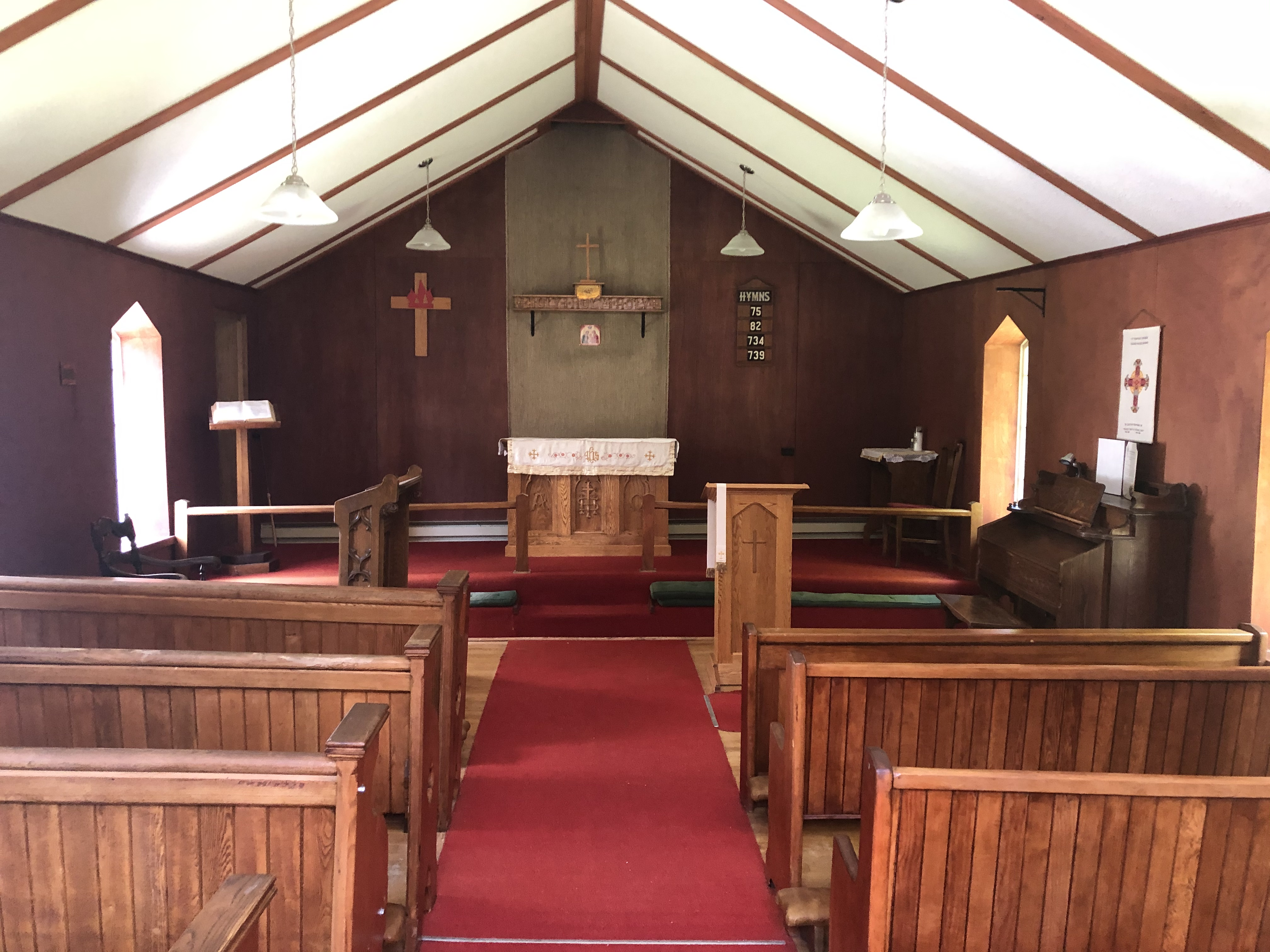
The interior of St. Thomas' Chapel.

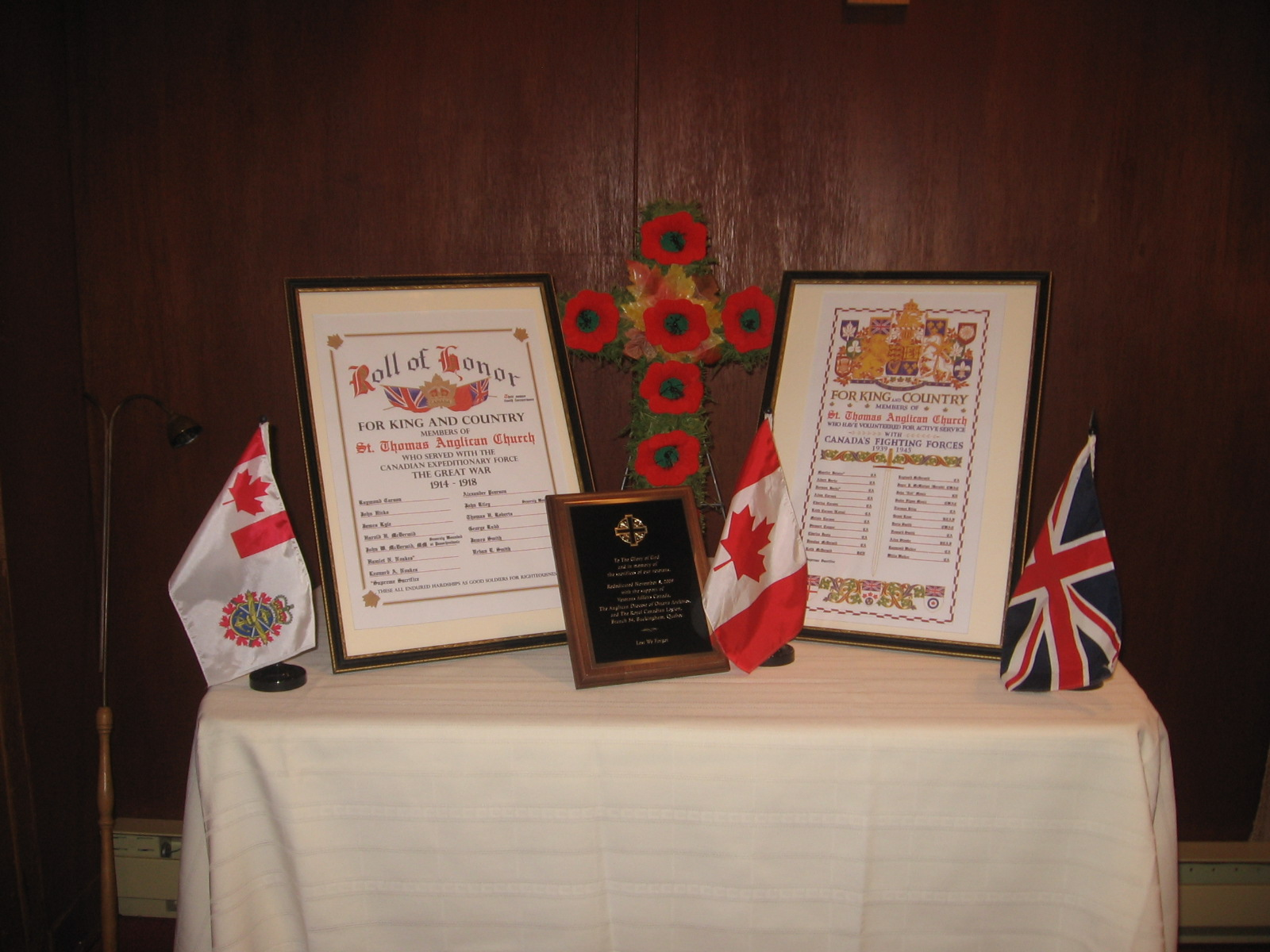
The Rededicated Memorial Rolls of Honour at St. Thomas

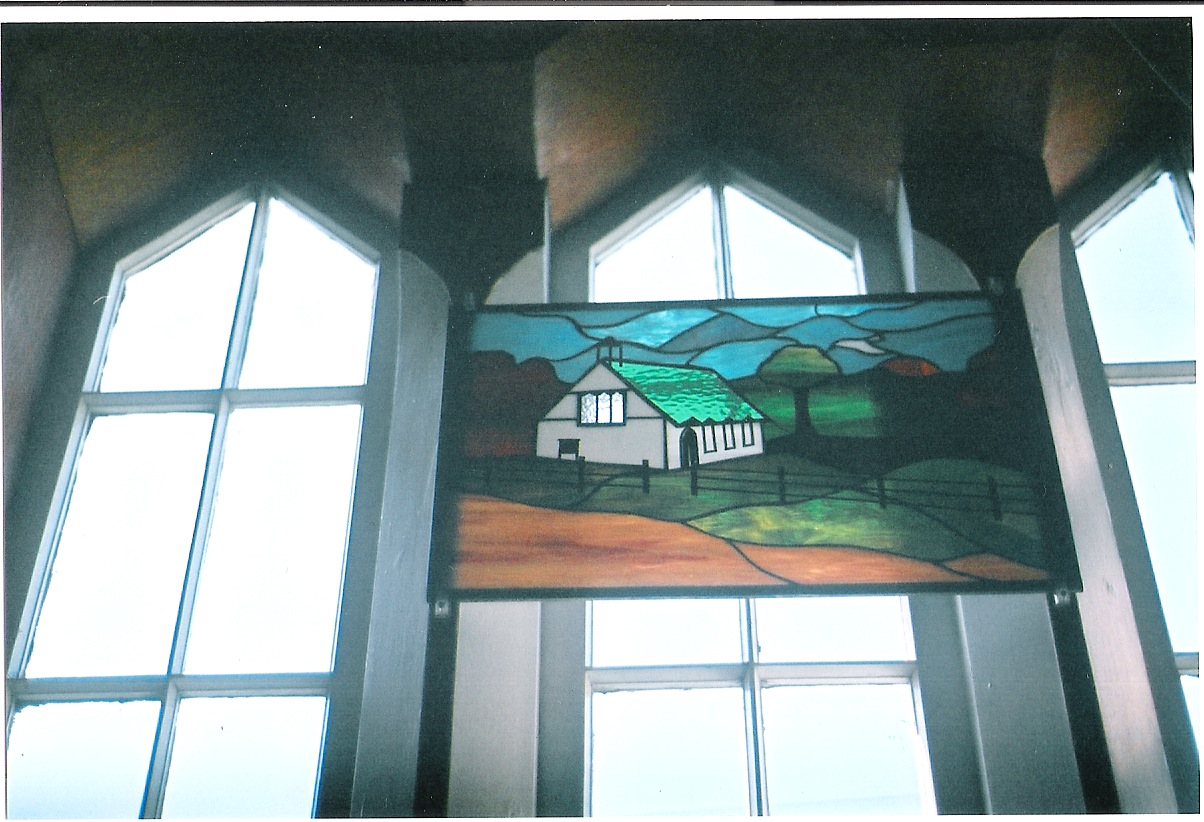
The Berndt Family memorial stained glass window at St. Thomas Silver Creek

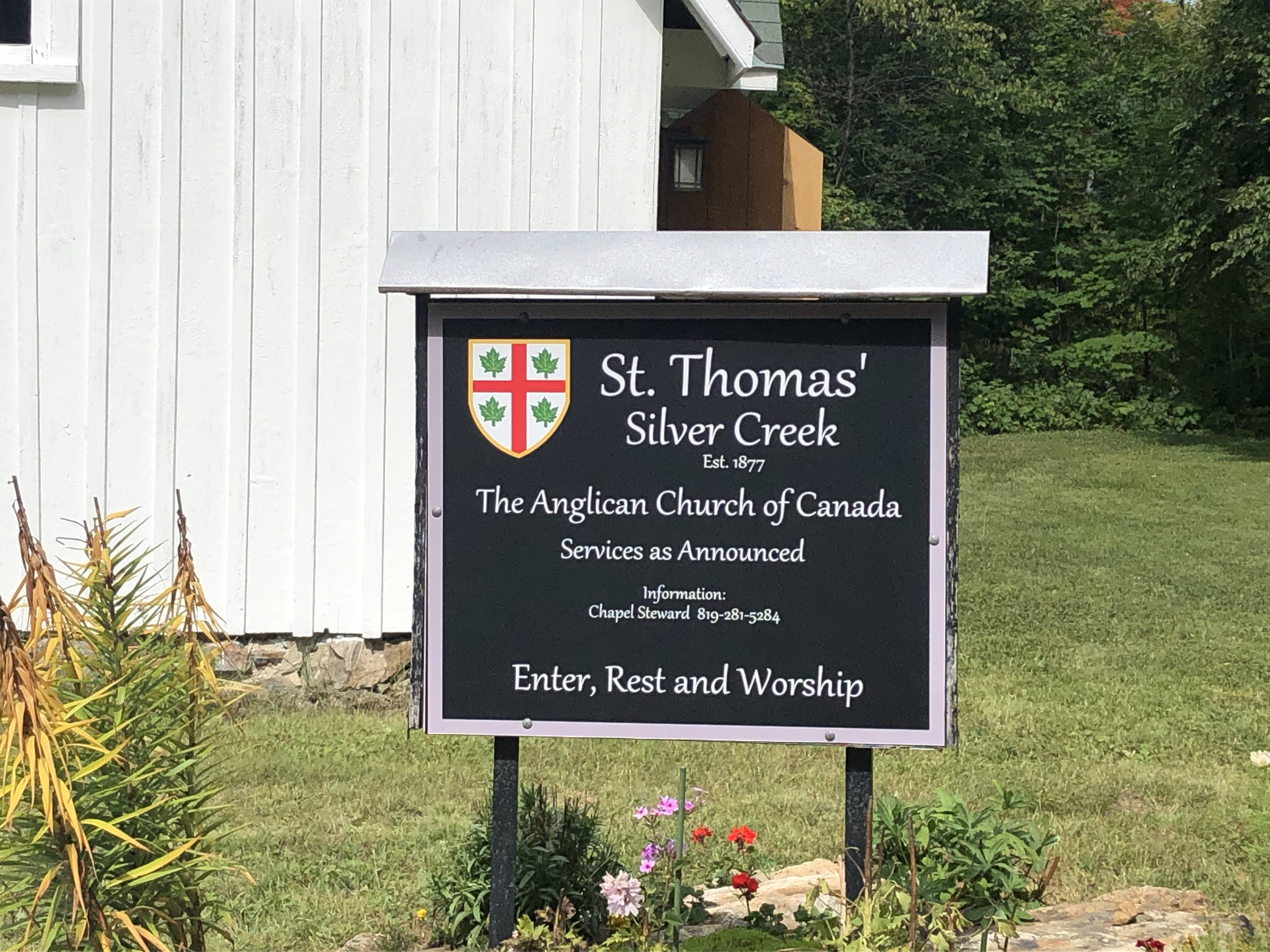
The chapel sign at St. Thomas' Silver Creek.

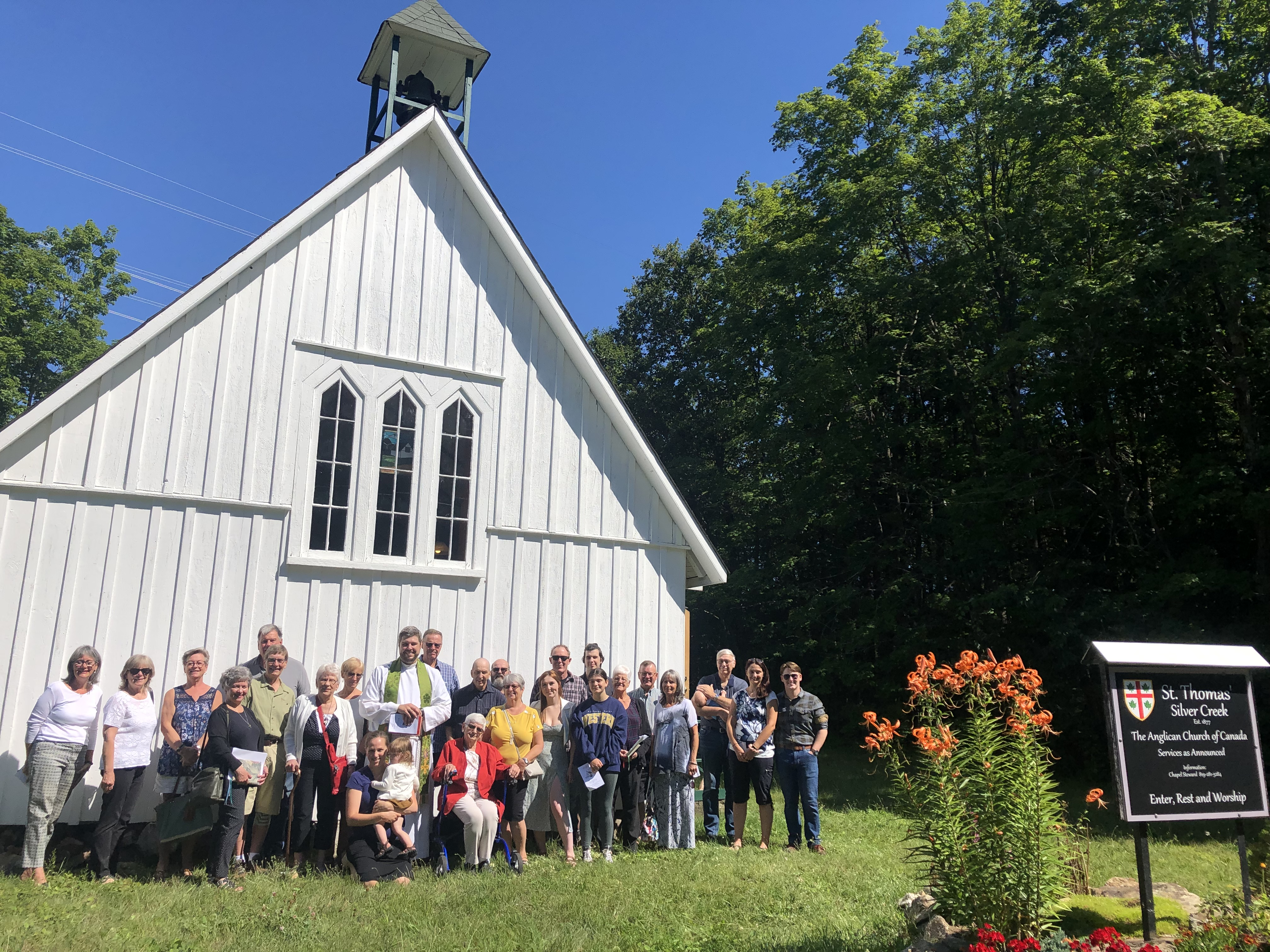
The chapel community of St. Thomas' Silver Creek, pictured in the summer of 2022.

== See also ==
- Anglican Diocese of Ottawa
- St. Stephen's Anglican Church, Buckingham, Quebec
- Anglican Church of Canada
- Anglican Communion
- Lochaber-Partie-Ouest, Quebec
