= Beit Jimal =

Catholic monastery in Israel

Beit Jimal بيت جمال
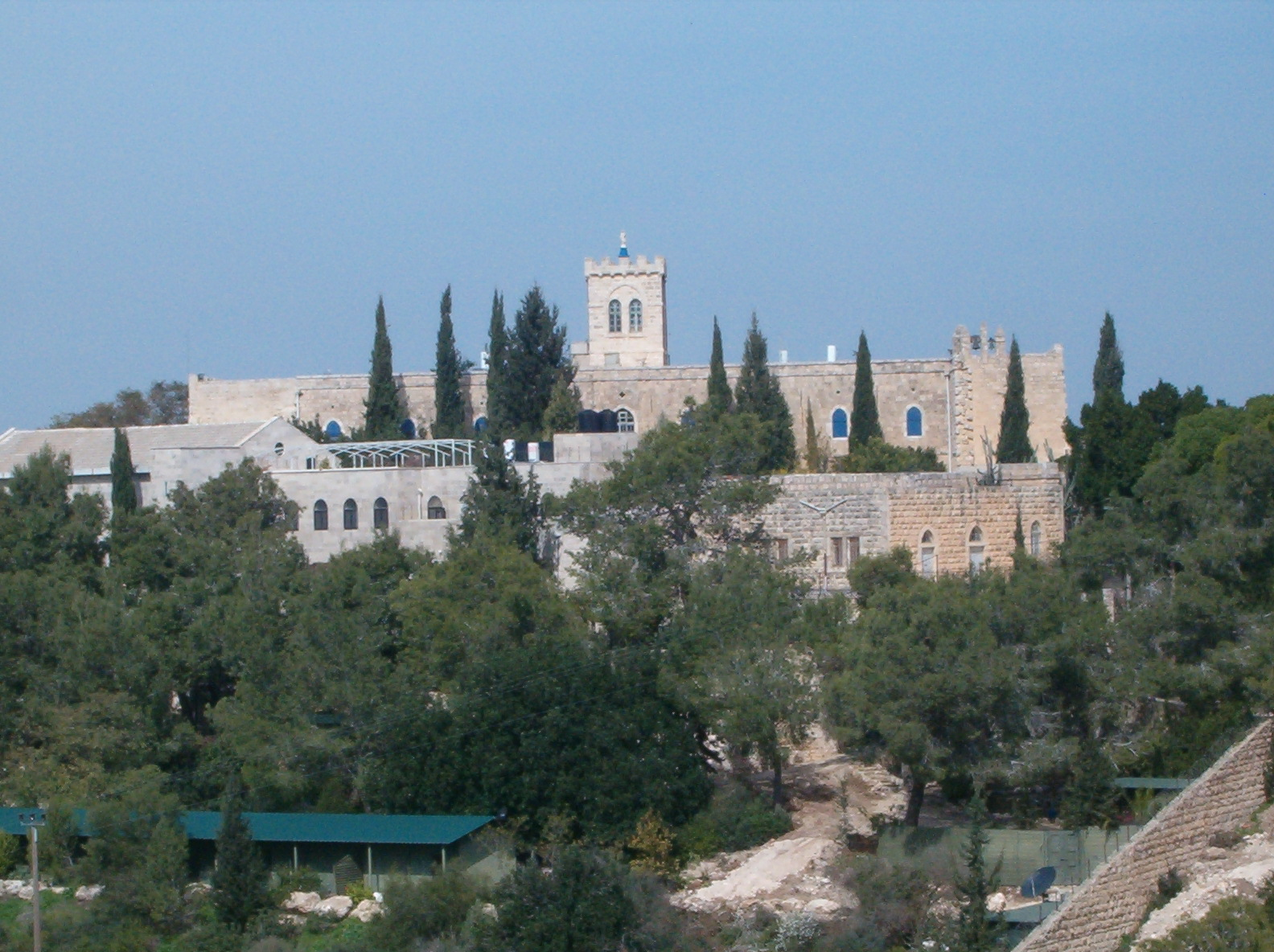
- Beit Jimal - general view
- Etymology: "House of the Camel"
- Location within Jerusalem District Location within Israel
- Coordinates: 31°43′30″N 34°58′35″E
- Grid position: 147/125 PAL
- Country: Israel
- District: Jerusalem

Beit Jimal or Beit Jamal (Arabic: بيت جمال, romanized: Bayt al-Jamāl, lit. 'House of the Camel') is a Catholic monastery run by Salesian priests and brothers near Beit Shemesh, Israel. The Christian tradition identifies the site with the Roman- and Byzantine-era Jewish village of Caphargamala (כפר גמלא), and believe that inside a cave in the area, there is the tomb of Saint Stephen or to have conserved his relics. An alternative spelling and etymology for the name is therefore Beit Gemal or Beit Gamal - the House of Rabban Gamaliel the Elder.

== Geography ==
The Palestine Exploration Fund's Survey of Western Palestine in 1883 described Beit Jimal (alt. sp. Beit el Jemâl) as possessing a natural spring three-quarters of a mile to the east, while to the south were caves. Natural brushwood consisting mainly of oak, buckthorn and mastic trees can be seen on the adjacent hill country lying to its south. To the east of Beit Jimal at a few hours' walking distance was the Arab village, Bayt Nattif. The monastery is located in the Judaean Mountains next to the city of Beit Shemesh.

== Climate ==
Climate data for Beit Jimal (1991-2020)
Month	Jan	Feb	Mar	Apr	May	Jun	Jul	Aug	Sep	Oct	Nov	Dec	Year
Mean daily maximum °C (°F)	17.1 (62.8)	18.1 (64.6)	21.0 (69.8)	25.4 (77.7)	29.3 (84.7)	31.7 (89.1)	33.1 (91.6)	33.4 (92.1)	32.1 (89.8)	29.5 (85.1)	24.3 (75.7)	19.3 (66.7)	26.2 (79.2)
Daily mean °C (°F)	13.1 (55.6)	13.8 (56.8)	16.1 (61.0)	19.5 (67.1)	23.0 (73.4)	25.4 (77.7)	27.2 (81.0)	27.6 (81.7)	26.5 (79.7)	24.1 (75.4)	19.7 (67.5)	15.2 (59.4)	20.9 (69.6)
Mean daily minimum °C (°F)	9.1 (48.4)	9.4 (48.9)	11.1 (52.0)	13.7 (56.7)	16.7 (62.1)	19.1 (66.4)	21.2 (70.2)	21.7 (71.1)	20.8 (69.4)	18.7 (65.7)	15.0 (59.0)	11.1 (52.0)	15.6 (60.1)
Average precipitation mm (inches)	135.9 (5.35)	108.6 (4.28)	61.1 (2.41)	15.1 (0.59)	6.9 (0.27)	0.2 (0.01)	0.0 (0.0)	0.0 (0.0)	0.3 (0.01)	15.0 (0.59)	56.9 (2.24)	110.1 (4.33)	510.1 (20.08)
Average precipitation days (≥ 1.0 mm)	9.4	8.2	5.4	2.1	0.8	0.0	0.0	0.0	0.1	2.0	4.7	7.2	39.9
Source: NOAA

== History ==
Ancient cisterns have been found here. In Arabic and Hebrew the site is now known as Beit Jimal – the monastery is sometimes referenced as Beit Gemal or Beit Jimal. The name of the site is said to be from its original name (in years past) as the Jewish village of Kfar Gamla (כפר גמלא), meaning "Village of the Camel" or "Village of the Recompense", and purportedly so named for Gamaliel, president of the ancient Jewish legislative body, the Sanhedrin. The Christian tradition believes that Gamaliel was buried here, as was Saint Stephen, the first Christian martyr, and Nicodemus. In 415 their remains were disclosed in a dream and discovered by the priest Lucian, and removed at the orders of John, Bishop of Jerusalem, for depositing in the Church of Hagia Sion on Mount Zion, at the site of today's Abbey of the Dormition. Thanks to the excavations carried out by Andrzej Strus on site, it is now largely accepted that in Byzantine times this was considered to be the burial site of St Stephen, Gamaliel, Nicodemus and Gamaliel's son Abibos.

In 2003, near a circular structure uncovered by Strus, was found a stone architrave or lintel with a tabula ansata. The writing on it was eventually deciphered by Emile Puech, expert in ancient writing from the Ecole Biblique. The writing ran, ΔΙΑΚΟΝΙΚΩΝ ΣΤΕΦΑΝΟΥ ΠΡΩΤΟΜΑΡΤΥΡΟΣ, (diakonikōn stephanou prōtomarturos) "Diaconicon of Stephen the Protomartyr". A diaconicon of a Byzantine church was one of the two spaces or chapels flanking the sanctuary, which often housed holy relics. This is therefore solid evidence for identifying Beit Jimal with the ancient Kfar Gamla, the traditional burial site of Saint Stephen.

In 2017, extensive remains of a sixth-century Byzantine monastery were excavated; finds included a large mosaic featuring birds, foliage and pomegranates.

=== Ottoman Empire ===
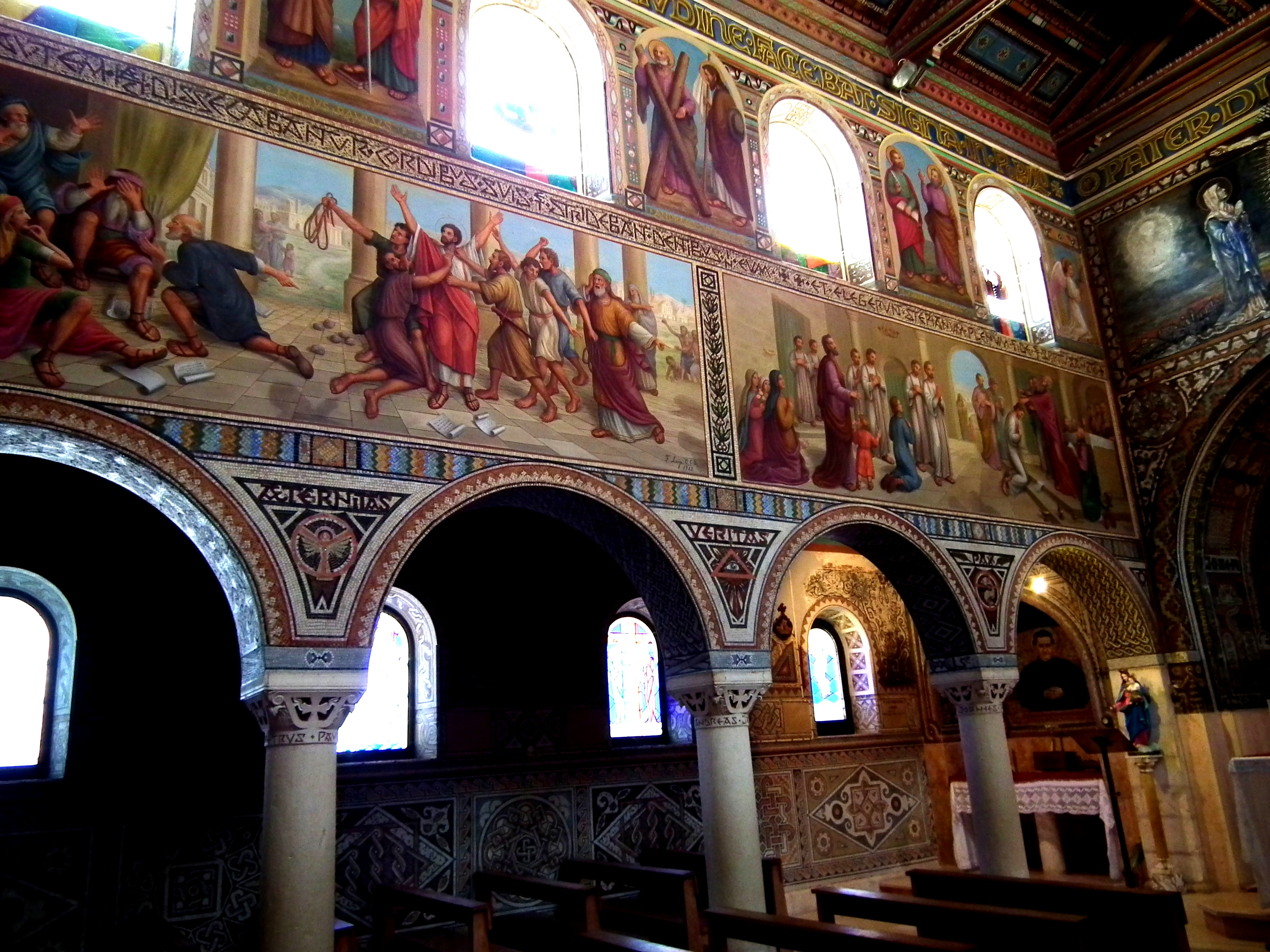
Church interior

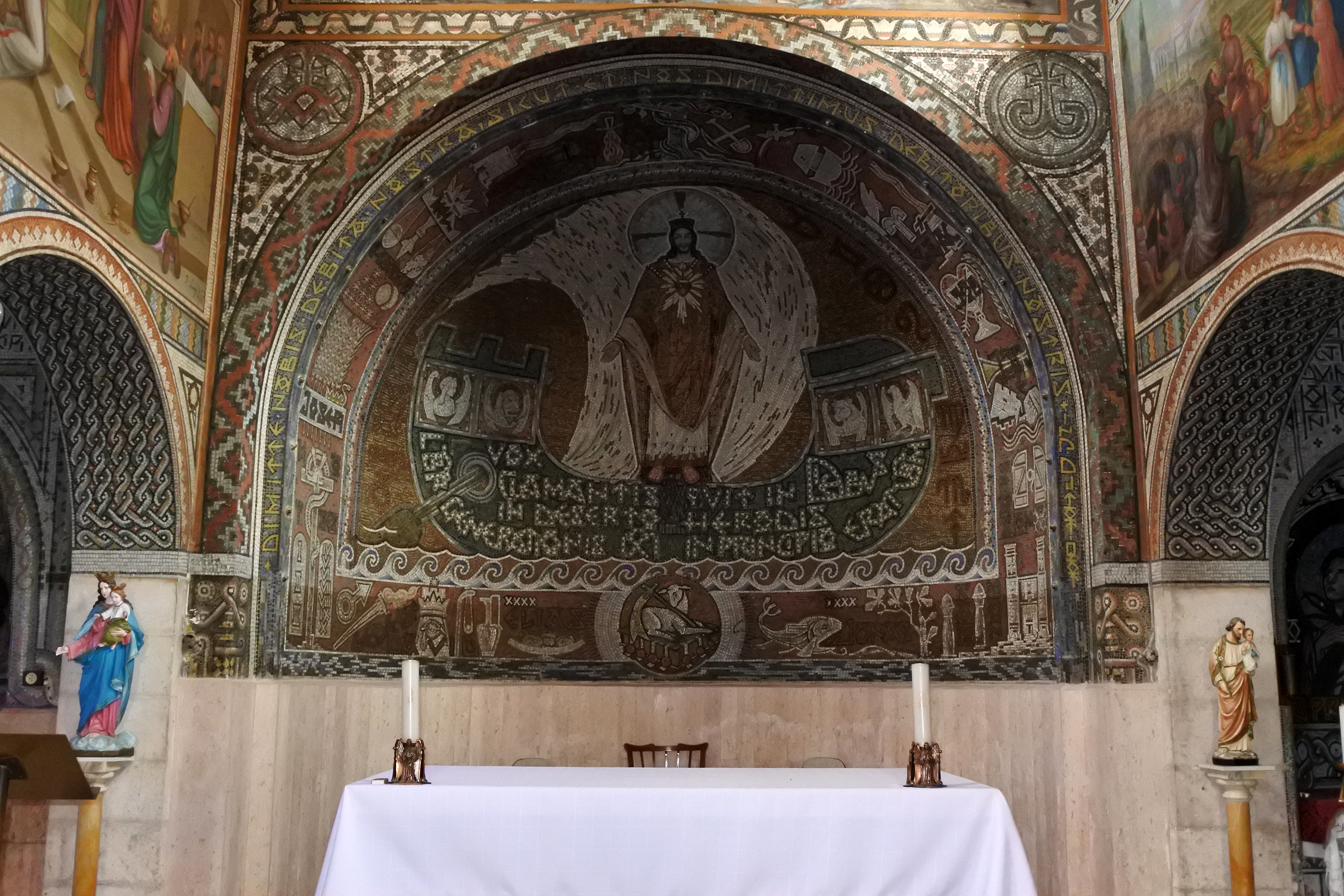
St. Stephen church interior.

Beit Jimal, like the rest of Palestine, was incorporated into the Ottoman Empire in 1517, and in the tax registers of 1596, it was a village in the nahiya of Gaza, Sanjak of Gaza, with a population of 37 households, all Muslims. They paid a fixed tax-rate of 33.3% on agricultural products, including wheat, barley, olive trees, goats and beehives, in addition to occasional revenues; a total of 3,500 akçe.

In 1838, Beit el-Jemal was noted as a Muslim village in the Er-Ramleh area. It was further noted to be in "ruins".

Victor Guérin visited in 1863, and reported that the inhabitants suffered from fevers. An Ottoman village list of about 1870 showed that Bayt Jimal had a population of 21, with a total of 8 houses, though the population count included men, only. The Palestine Exploration Fund's Survey of Western Palestine described Beit Jimal in the 1870s as a small village.

The Land was purchased in 1869 by Fr. Antonio Belloni, who set up the Beit Gemal School of Agriculture for the benefit of underprivileged youth, especially orphans in 1873. By 1881, a Latin Convent was being built there, known as the Latin Hospice and Orphanage. The land was purchased by the Marquis of Bute, and given by him to Don Belloni for the construction of an Agricultural School, similar to the one established by him in Bethlehem. In 1892, Don Belloni transferred the Orphanage and School to a religious society known as the Salesians founded by Don Bosco at Turin. In 1899, there were about 30 orphans housed at the Beit Jimal Orphanage, along with nuns and brothers of the society.

=== British Mandate ===
After the war's end, the Ottoman Empire was partitioned and Mandatory Palestine was accorded to the United Kingdom by the League of Nations. In a census conducted in 1922 by the British Mandate authorities, Bait Jamal had a population of 59; 56 Christians and 3 Muslims, where the Christians were 29 Roman Catholics, 24 Melkites and 2 Maronites.

By the 1931 census this had increased to 168; 78 Christians and 90 Muslims, in a total of 22 houses.

In the 1945 statistics the population of Beit Jimal consisted of 240; 120 Muslims and 120 Christians and the land area was 4,878 dunams, according to an official land and population survey. Of this, 715 dunams were designated for plantations and irrigable land, 2,899 for cereals, while 1,264 dunams were classified as non-cultivable land.

=== Israel ===
==== 20th century ====
During the 1948 Arab–Israeli War, the village was occupied by Egyptian troops, before being evicted by the Har'el Brigade in Operation Ha-Har.

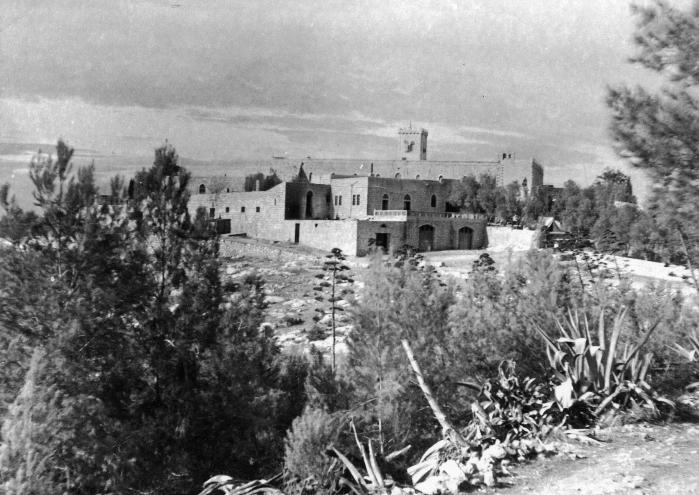
Bayt Jimal Monastery, 1948. The original caption says it was also an agricultural school.

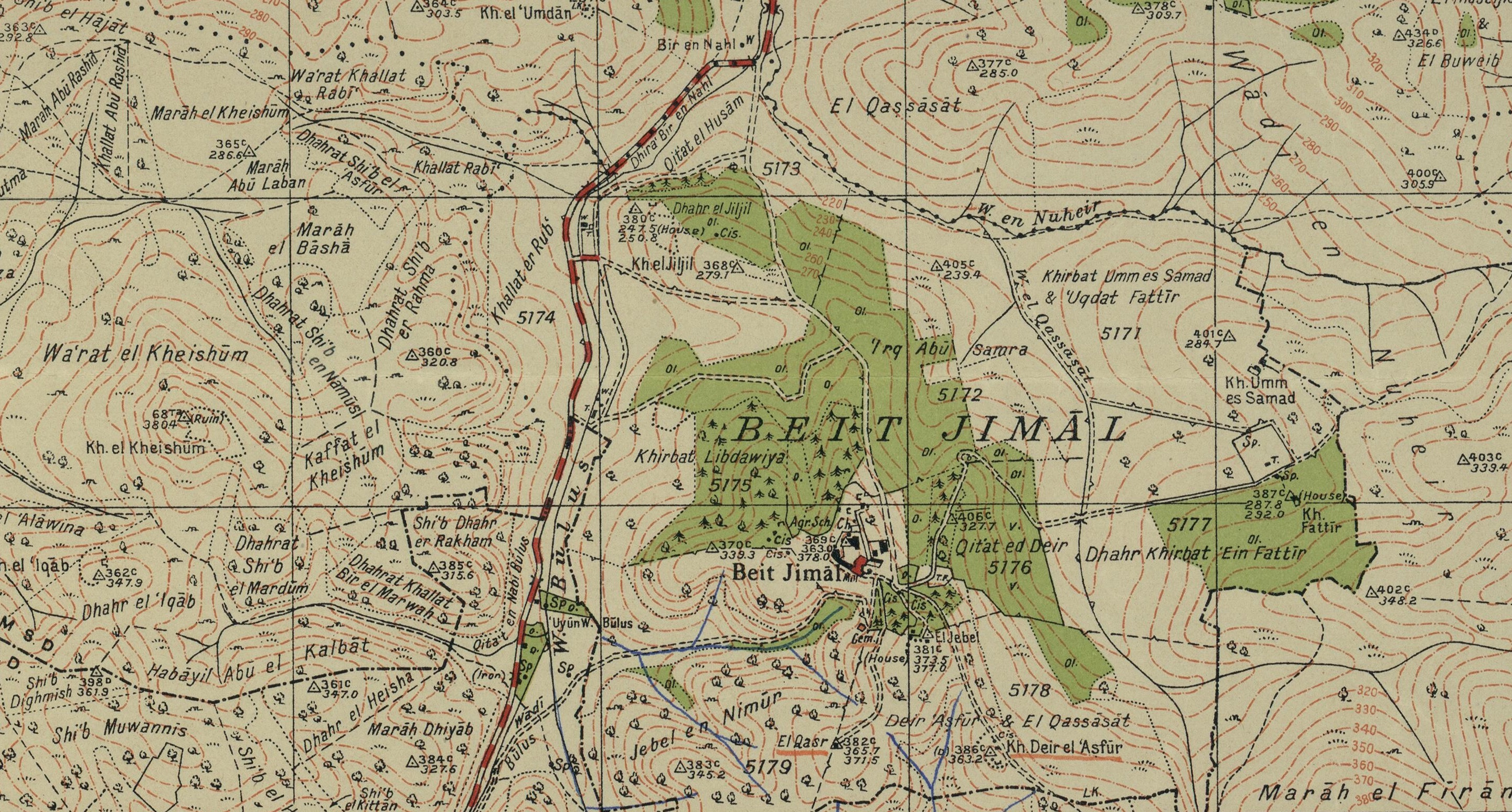
Beit Jimal 1947 1:20,000

The large campus is in the possession of the Society of St Francis de Sales (Salesians of Don Bosco), who have a monastery. Besides this, there are two other monasteries, one for men (since 2000) and one for women (since 1987), belonging to the Monastic Family of Bethlehem, of the Assumption of the Virgin and of Saint Bruno (or simply Monks and Sisters of Bethlehem). The nuns do not belong to Salesian Sisters who left the place in 1985. These monks and nuns spend time in silence, prayer and work.

Next to the Salesian house there is also a small and well-appointed church, called St. Stephen's Church, Beit Jimal, built in 1930 on the ruins of a 5th-century Byzantine church discovered on the site discovered in 1916, during works to enlarge the monastery garden. The mosaics on the external walls are those excavated from the Byzantine church. Tradition holds that St. Stephen was buried by Gamaliel in his own private tomb in Caphargamala. Fine mosaics from the period were also brought to light. The monastery produces and markets its own honey, olive oil and wine, the last of which is processed at the Cremisan monastery winery just south of Jerusalem. The monastery has a small shop that offers its locally made olive oil and red wines.

An alternative suggests that the cave site may have contained a mikveh belonging to a wealthy Jewish family. The name Beit Jamal appears to preserve the toponym Kfar Gamala (Gamala Village), which in turn suggests a link to rabbi Gamaliel. The agricultural school was closed by authorities in 1967.

==== 21st century ====
A statue erected in 2000 commemorating Saint Stephen's martyrdom is the work of Israeli artist Igael Tumarkin.

There is a small concert hall, where concerts are played on some weekends.

On February 23, 2010, Neta Sorek an Israeli woman from Zikhron Ya'akov was murdered while walking alone in Beit Jimal Monastery gardens by members of a Palestinian terrorist cell who illegally infiltrated into Israel from Surif, a Palestinian Authority-controlled area.

In 2013, the monastery suffered from a "price tag" attack, when the hallway of the monastery was firebombed and the slogans "price tag," "death to the Gentiles," and "revenge" were sprayed on its walls. The monastery was vandalized several times in subsequent years.

== Meteorological station ==
A meteorological station was established in Beit Jimal in 1919 which is still in operation today.

== Gallery ==
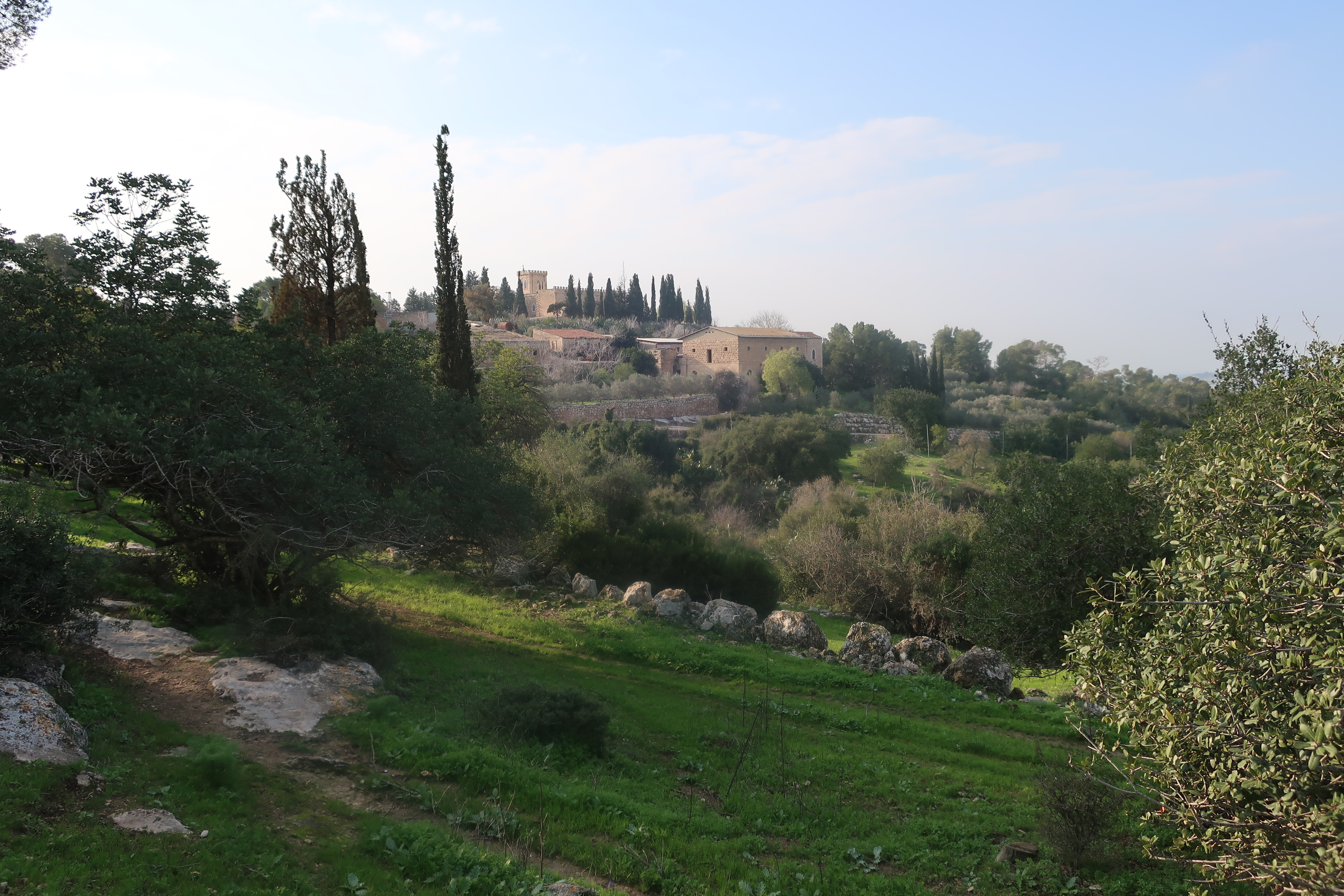
Beit Jimal

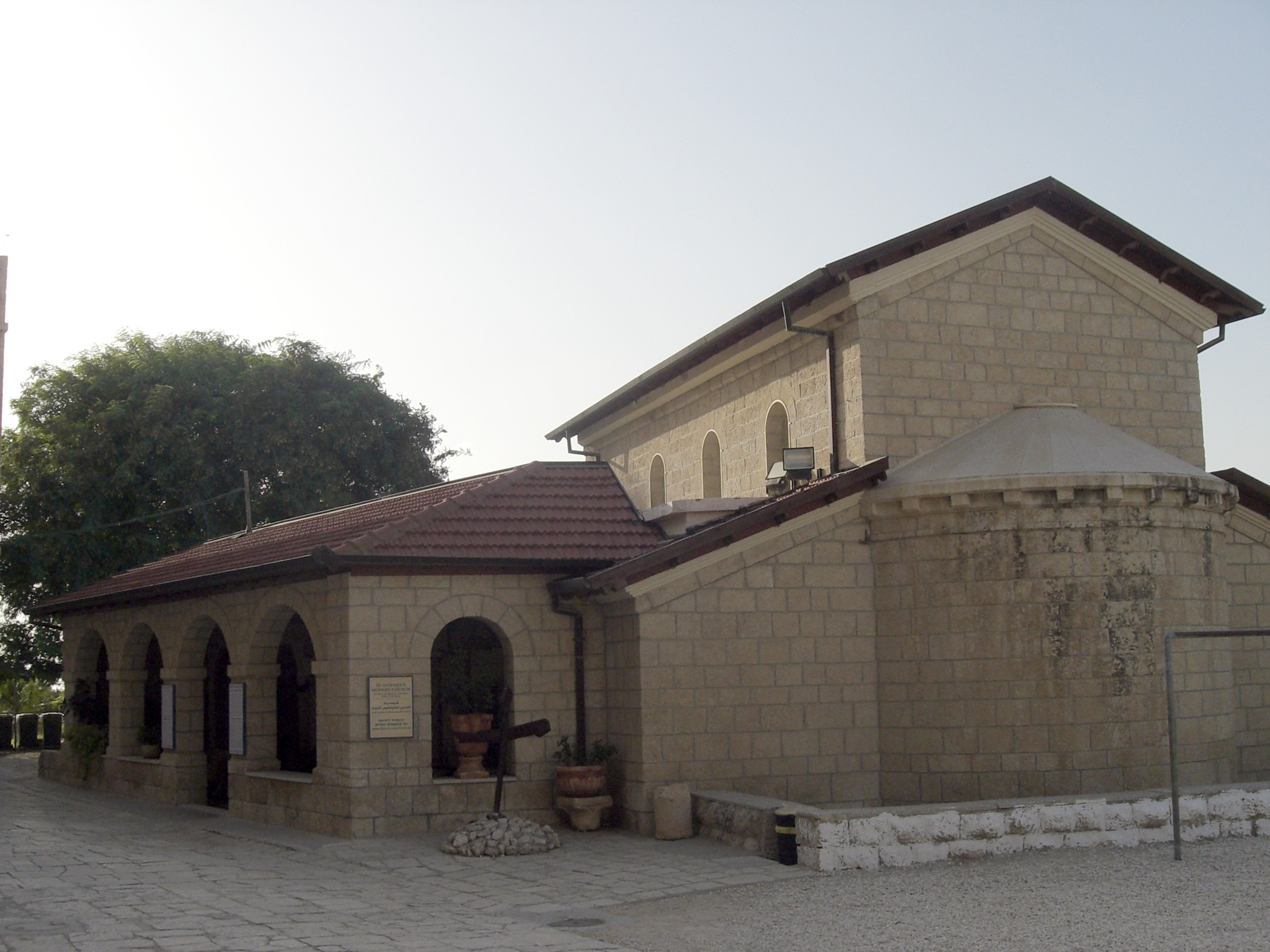
St Stephen's Church

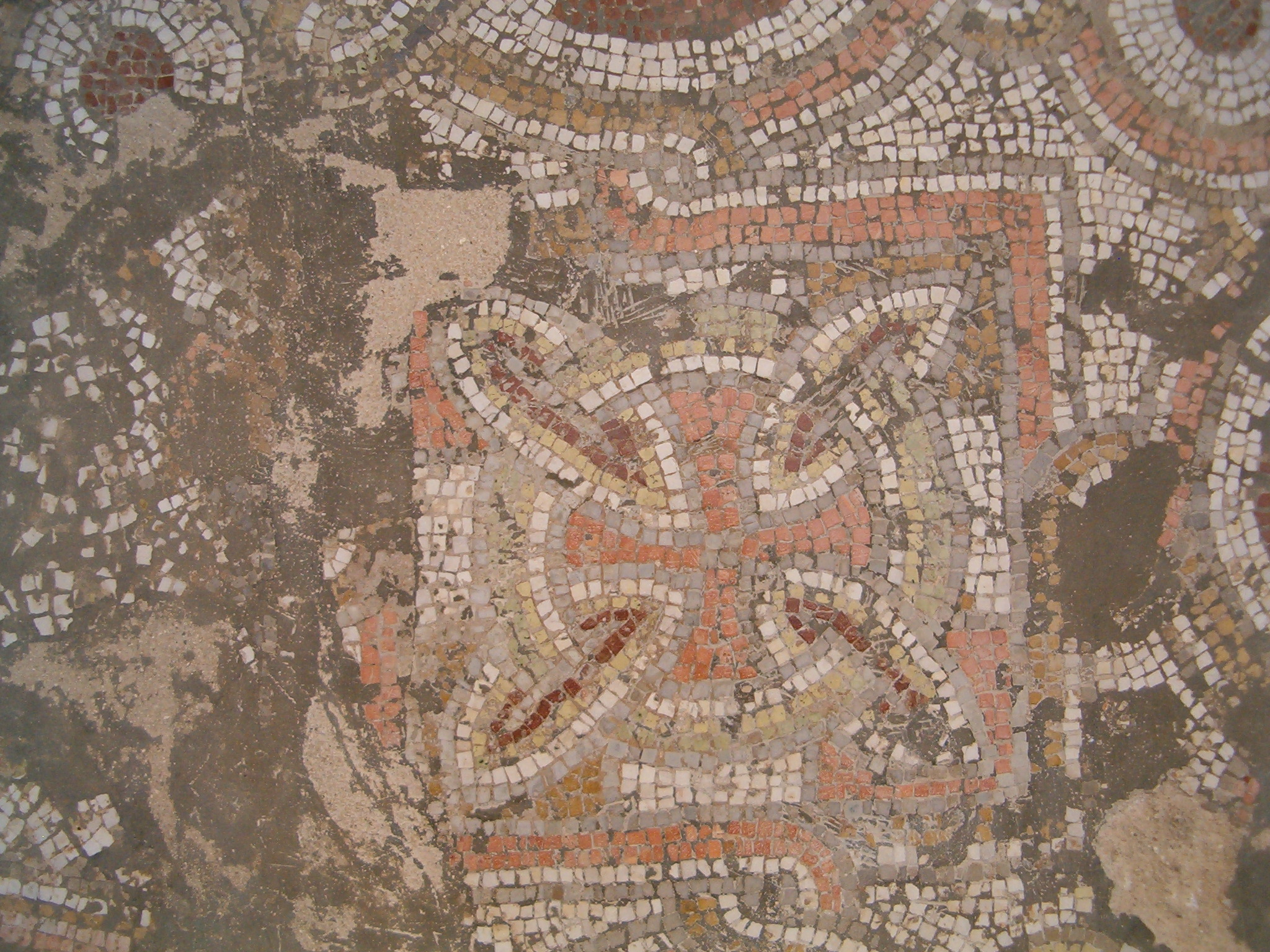
Fifth-century mosaic exterior wall of St. Stephen's Church

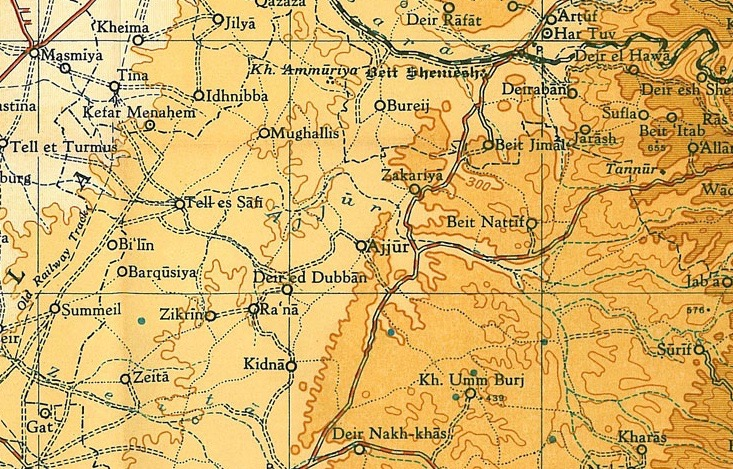
Beit Jimal 1945 1:250,000

== Bibliography ==
- Barron, J. B., ed. (1923). Palestine: Report and General Abstracts of the Census of 1922. Government of Palestine.
- Conder, C.R.; Kitchener, H.H. (1883). The Survey of Western Palestine: Memoirs of the Topography, Orography, Hydrography, and Archaeology. Vol. 3. London: Committee of the Palestine Exploration Fund.
- Dauphin, C. (1998). La Palestine byzantine, Peuplement et Populations. BAR International Series 726 (in French). Vol. III : Catalogue. Oxford: Archeopress. ISBN 0-860549-05-4.
- Department of Statistics (1945). Village Statistics, April, 1945. Government of Palestine.
- Guérin, V. (1869). Description Géographique Historique et Archéologique de la Palestine (in French). Vol. 1: Judee, pt. 2. Paris: L'Imprimerie Nationale.
- Hadawi, S. (1970). Village Statistics of 1945: A Classification of Land and Area ownership in Palestine. Palestine Liberation Organization Research Center.
- Hartmann, M. (1883). "Die Ortschaftenliste des Liwa Jerusalem in dem türkischen Staatskalender für Syrien auf das Jahr 1288 der Flucht (1871)". Zeitschrift des Deutschen Palästina-Vereins. 6: 102–149.
- Hütteroth, W.-D.; Abdulfattah, K. (1977). Historical Geography of Palestine, Transjordan and Southern Syria in the Late 16th Century. Erlanger Geographische Arbeiten, Sonderband 5. Erlangen, Germany: Vorstand der Fränkischen Geographischen Gesellschaft. ISBN 3-920405-41-2.
- Mills, E., ed. (1932). Census of Palestine 1931. Population of Villages, Towns and Administrative Areas. Jerusalem: Government of Palestine.
- Morris, B. (2004). The Birth of the Palestinian Refugee Problem Revisited. Cambridge University Press. ISBN 978-0-521-00967-6. (pp. 447, 462 466 493)
- Palmer, E.H. (1881). The Survey of Western Palestine: Arabic and English Name Lists Collected During the Survey by Lieutenants Conder and Kitchener, R. E. Transliterated and Explained by E.H. Palmer. Committee of the Palestine Exploration Fund.
- Robinson, E.; Smith, E. (1841). Biblical Researches in Palestine, Mount Sinai and Arabia Petraea: A Journal of Travels in the year 1838. Vol. 3. Boston: Crocker & Brewster.
- Socin, A. (1879). "Alphabetisches Verzeichniss von Ortschaften des Paschalik Jerusalem". Zeitschrift des Deutschen Palästina-Vereins. 2: 135–163.
- Wilson, Charles W. (1899). "A Visit to Tell Zakariya". Quarterly Statement - Palestine Exploration Fund. 31.
