= St. Stephen's Episcopal Church (St. Stephen, South Carolina) =

Historic church in South Carolina, United States

- St. Stephens Episcopal Church
- U.S. National Register of Historic Places
- U.S. National Historic Landmark
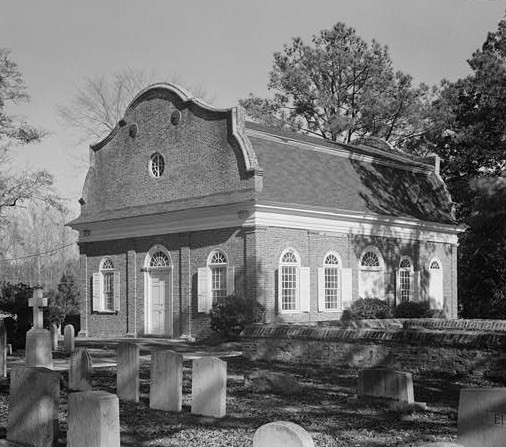
- 1978 HABS photo

- Location within South Carolina Location within the United States
- Location: 196 Brick Church Circle, St. Stephen, SC
- Coordinates: 33.4054°N 79.9166°W
- Area: 4.6 acres (1.9 ha)
- Built: 1767
- Architect: Francis Villepontoux; Et al.
- Architectural style: Georgian
- NRHP reference No.: 70000570

Significant dates
- Added to NRHP: April 15, 1970
- Designated NHL: April 15, 1970

St. Stephen's Episcopal Church is a historic church located at 196 Brick Church Circle in St. Stephen, South Carolina. Built in the 1760s, it is one of a handful of surviving 18th-century brick parish churches in the state, with a number of architectural features not found on any other of the period. It was declared a National Historic Landmark in 1970.

== Description and history ==
St. Stephen's Church is located on the east side of St. Stephen, on the south side of Church Road (South Carolina Highway 45). It is set on a parcel of about 4.5 acres (1.8 ha) that includes the churchyard and cemetery, and is surrounded on three sides by Brick Church Circle. The church is a single-story brick structure, 46 feet (14 m) long and 36 feet (11 m) wide. It is topped by a gambrel roof with curvilinear roof sections and Jacobean gable ends. There are three entrances, two on the long sides and one on the short western side. The doors and windows are set in round-arch openings with fanlight windows above, and the bays on each side are articulated by Doric brick pilasters. The interior is divided roughly into four sections by two crossing aisles, with the pulpit located at the eastern end, in front of a small Palladian window. The ceiling is of ornamented metal. The building's walls are stabilized by iron rods (placed after an 1886 earthquake), that run down and across the interior of the structure. it is built in Georgian style. | added = April 15, 1970

The St. Stephen's parish was set off from the parish of St. James, Santee in 1754. This church was built between 1767 and 1769, replacing an earlier wood frame structure. It is one of South Carolina's well-preserved small brick country parish churches, its unique features including the gambrel roof and pilastered exterior, and the interior ceiling. It was built and designed by Francis Villepontoux and A. Howard who provided the bricks. William Axson was the master mason. There were no regular services in the church between 1808 and 1932, but the building was not neglected. Needed repairs were done twice during the 19th century.

== Current use ==
St. Stephen's is still an active church in the Episcopal Diocese of South Carolina. The Rev. Jeffrey Richardson is the current rector.

== See also ==
- National Register of Historic Places listings in Berkeley County, South Carolina
- List of National Historic Landmarks in South Carolina
- St. Stephen's Episcopal Church (disambiguation)
