= St. Stephen's Anglican Church (Buckingham, Quebec) =

St. Stephen's Buckingham
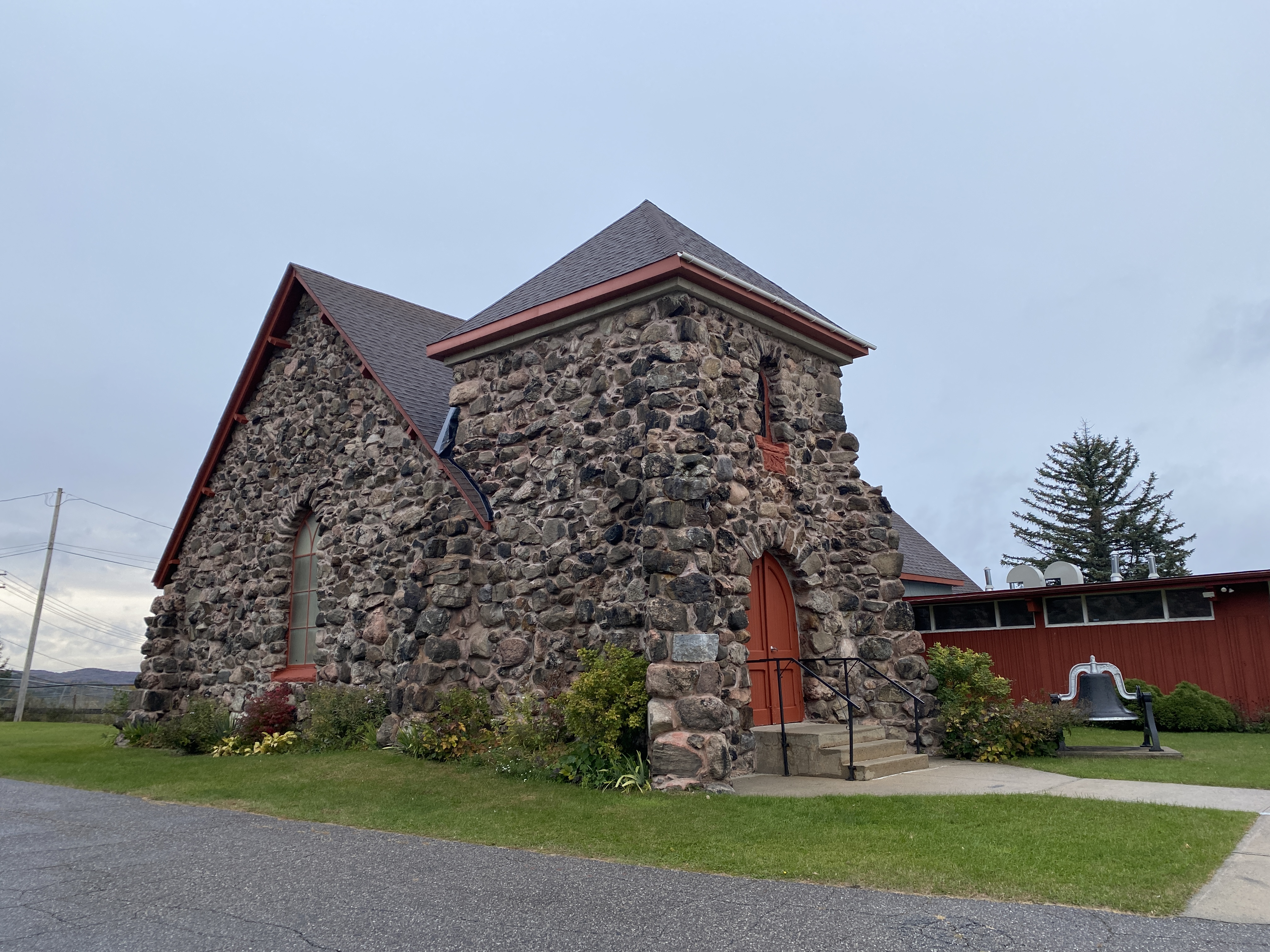
- St. Stephen's Buckingham
- Location: 45, chemin Donaldson; Gatineau, Quebec; J8L 4M6
- Denomination: Anglican Church of Canada

History
- Dedication: 1845; 181 years ago

Administration
- Diocese: Anglican Diocese of Ottawa
- Deanery: West Quebec
- Parish: Eastern Chapels

St. Stephen's Anglican Chapel is a historic stone church located at 45 Donaldson Road in the Buckingham sector of Gatineau, Quebec, Canada. First organized as a congregation in 1845, St. Stephen's counts itself among the oldest anglophone churches in West Quebec.

== Church History ==
St. Stephen's was first built as a wooden church by the English and Scottish settlers of Buckingham, Quebec in 1852. Under the direction of the Anglican Diocese of Montreal, Anglican missionaries began organizing a congregation in the rural logging settlement in the early 1840s. With the impending construction of the first church in the region sponsored by The Church of England, the area welcomed its first full-time Anglican priest, Rev. Richard L. Stevenson, in 1850. With the support of a growing anglophone population, a larger stone church was erected in 1899 to replace the wooden building built by the early settlers. This second church continues to be used for worship and community events to this day.

The Diocese of Montreal formally transferred the Parish of Buckingham, comprising St. Stephen's and St. Thomas Anglican Church, Silver Creek, Quebec, to the Anglican Diocese of Ottawa in the mid-twentieth century.

== Church Today ==
The church was designated as a chapel of ease in 2017 and is now one of the Eastern Chapels of the Anglican Diocese of Ottawa within the Deanery of West Quebec. Services are scheduled seasonally, and are led by either an ordained Anglican priest or a licensed lay reader. The church is also available by request for weddings, funerals, baptisms, confirmations and other such occasions. The church's Toope Memorial Hall, built in the 1960s with the support of the Erco Chemical Company and dedicated to the memory of The Rev. Frank Toope and his wife Jocelyn, is a community centre that is often rented out to local residents and groups for large receptions and other activities.

== St. John's Chapel ==
In 2013, under the leadership of churchwardens John Carson and Barbara Elliott — and following a donation of sanctuary furnishings from the former St. John's Quyon — the parishioners of St. Stephen's transformed what was once their Sunday School room into a winter chapel. Named in honour of the Quyon congregation, "St. John's Chapel" was officially opened by the Archdeacon of Clarendon, the Venerable Sally Gadd, on November 24, 2013, and was dedicated by the Rt. Rev. Dr. John H. Chapman, Bishop of Ottawa, on May 8, 2016.

== Camp ARK & Ecumenical Youth Activities ==
St. Stephen's first sponsored an ecumenical Daily Vacation Bible School called "Camp ARK: Acts of Random Kindness," for children ages 5 to 13 from August 9 to 12 2010 at St. Stephen's Church Hall, Buckingham. The camp, which was a great success, also received financial support from St. Stephen's and St. John's Glen Almond. In total, fourteen children attended the first camp. The second edition of Camp ARK was held from August 8 to 11 2011; forty-five children attended the second edition of the program. Camp ARK 2012 was held from August 13 to 16 2012 at St. Andrew's United Church and included 51 students. In 2013 Camp ARK returned to St. Stephen's and hosted a record seventy-one students between August 12 and 15. Following a one-year hiatus, Camp Ark returned in 2015 and hosted a further fifty campers.

== Cemetery Memorial Service ==
St. Stephen's annual Cemetery Memorial service is typically held on the fourth Sunday in September at 2pm.

== Photo gallery ==
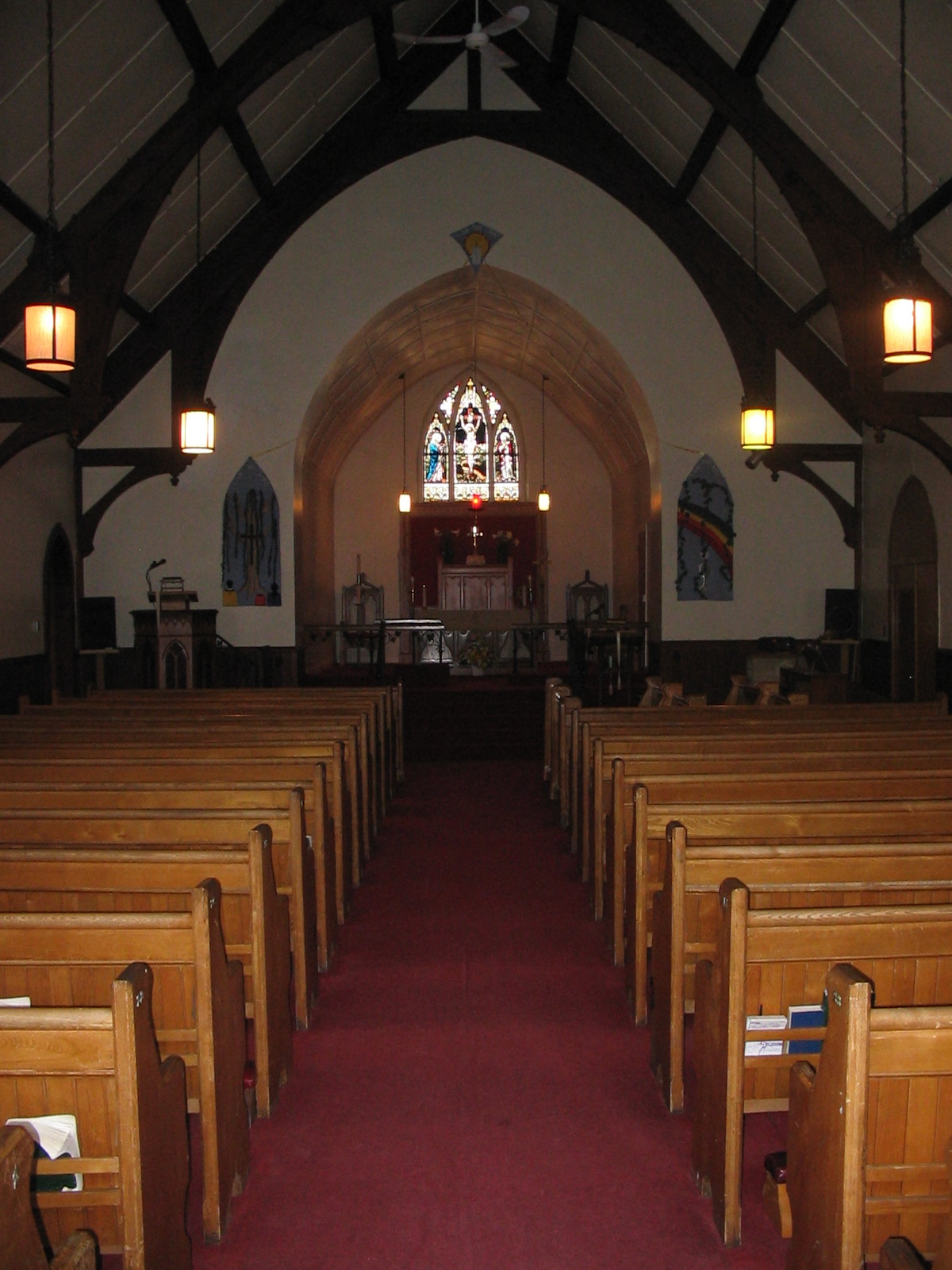
A look at the interior of St. Stephen's

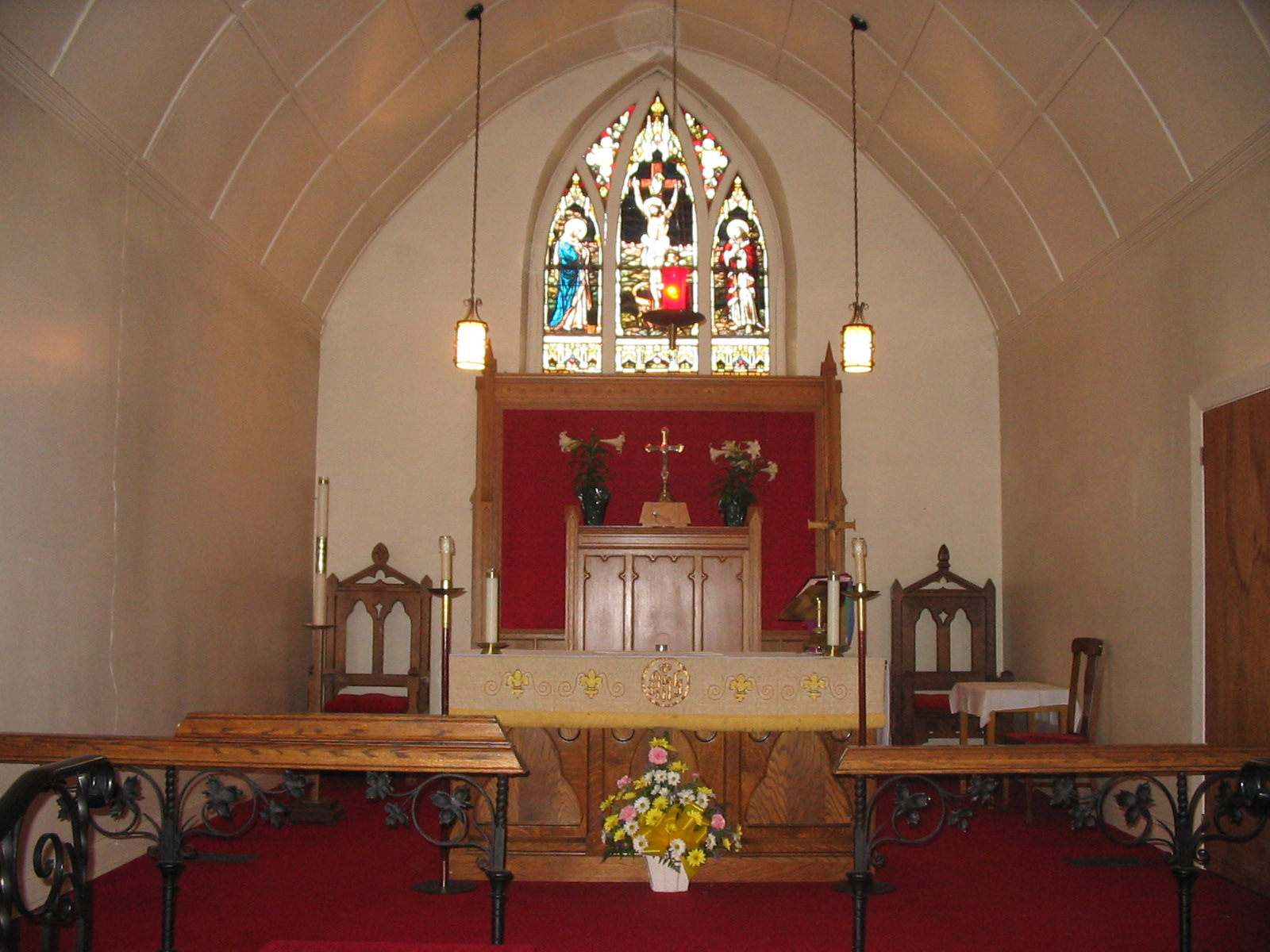
A view of the altar

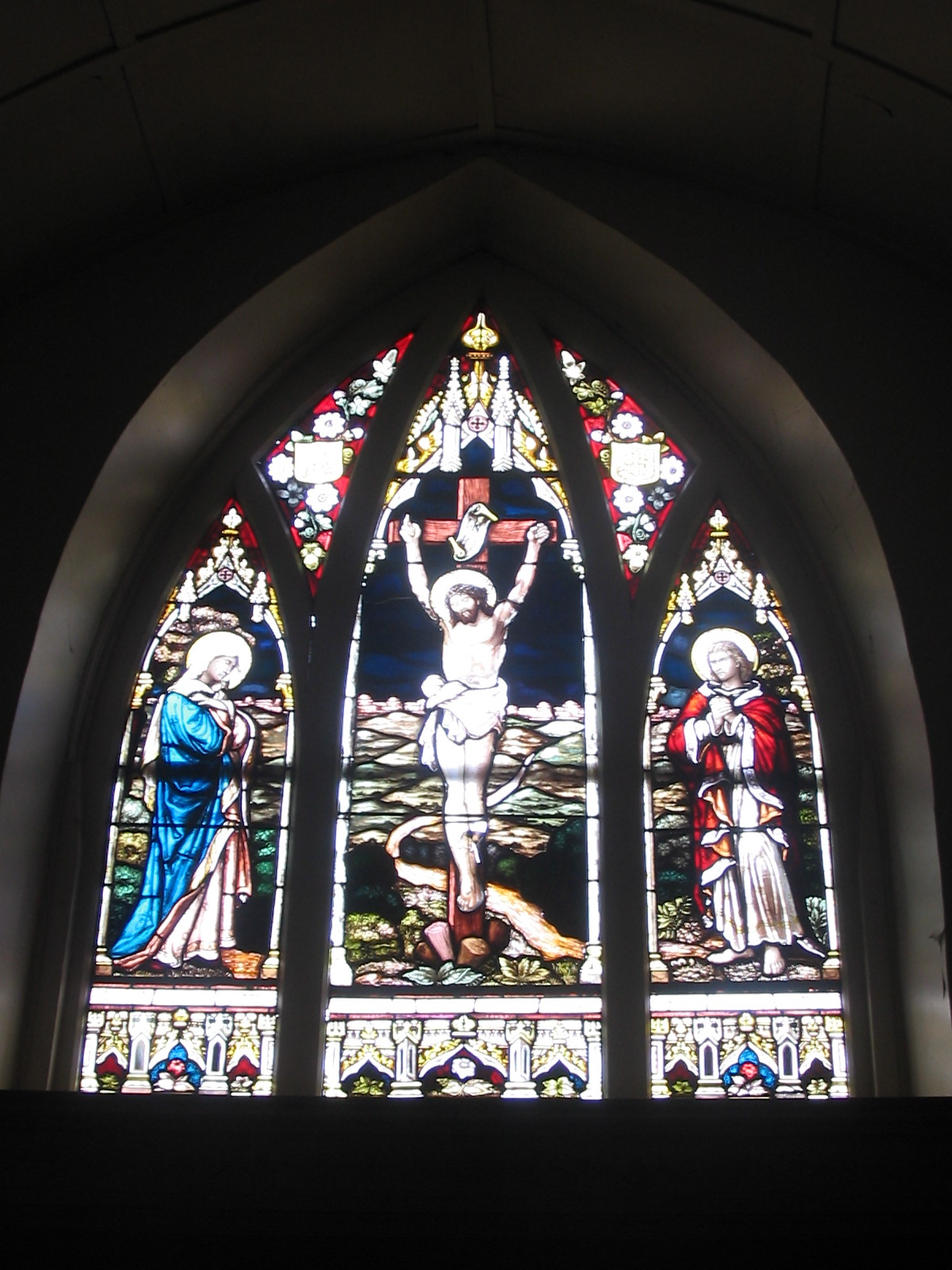
A close up of the stained glass window above the altar

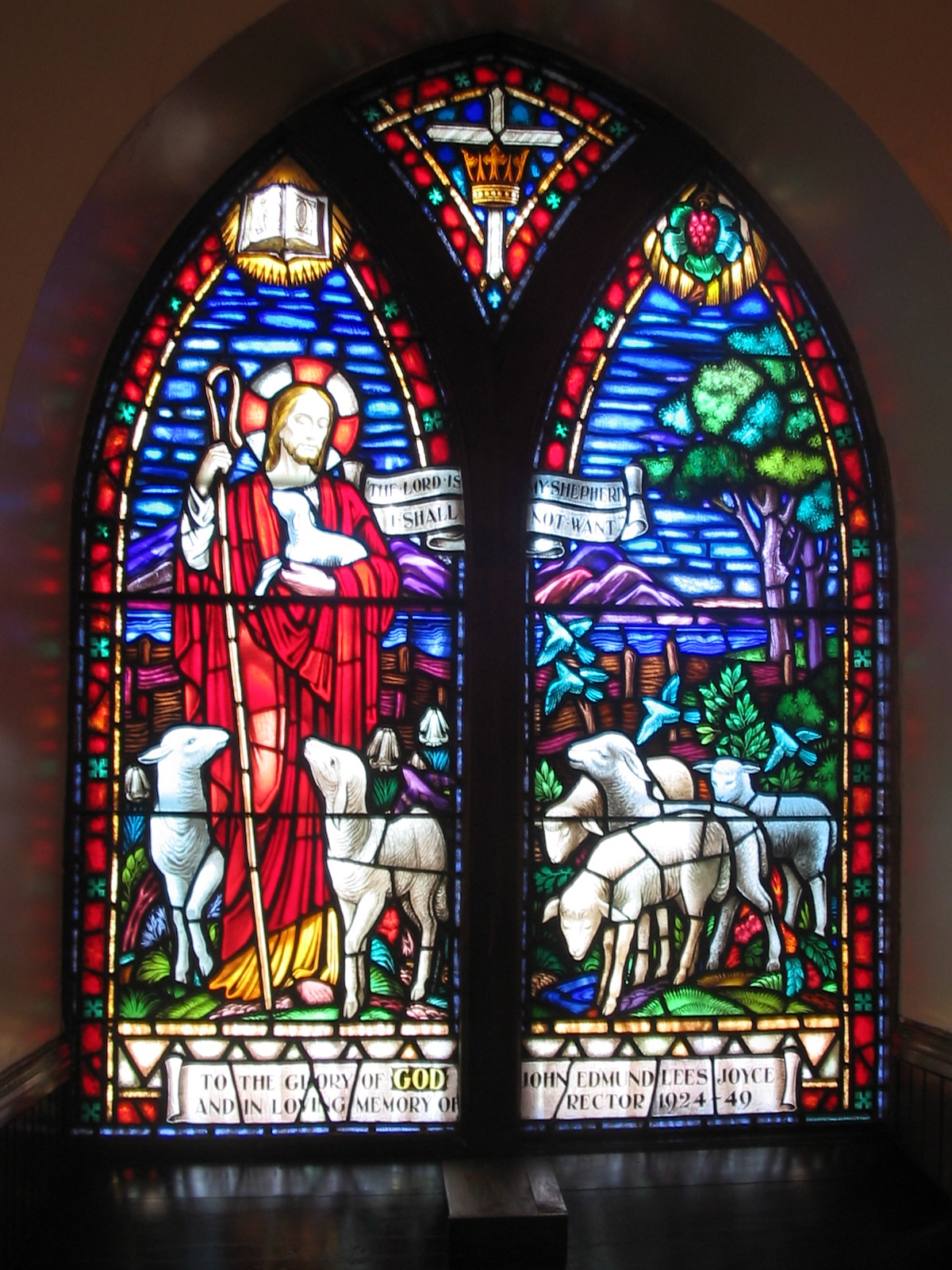
A stained glass window dedicated to Rev. John E.L. Joyce

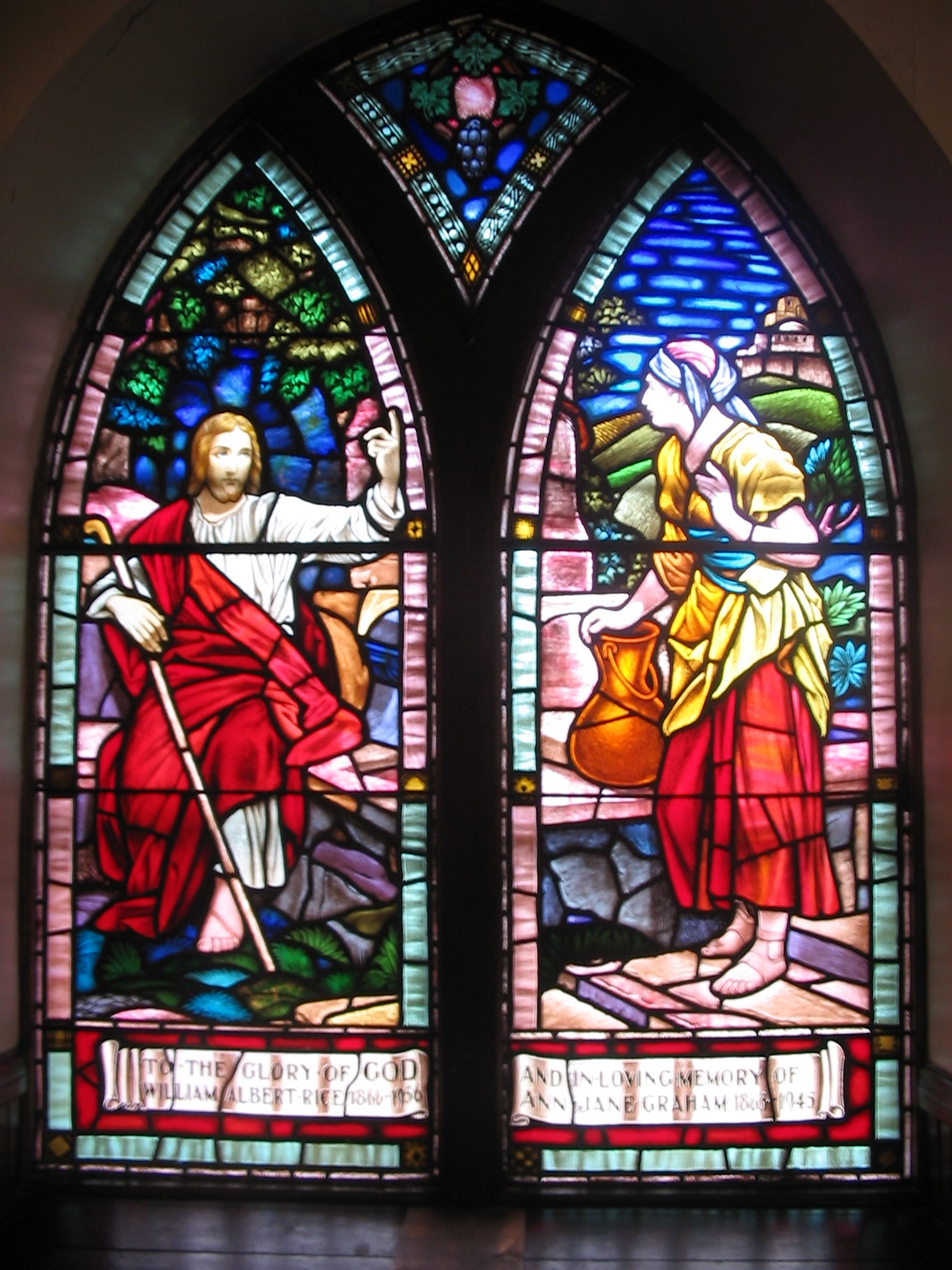
A stained glass window dedicated to William Rice and Ann Graham

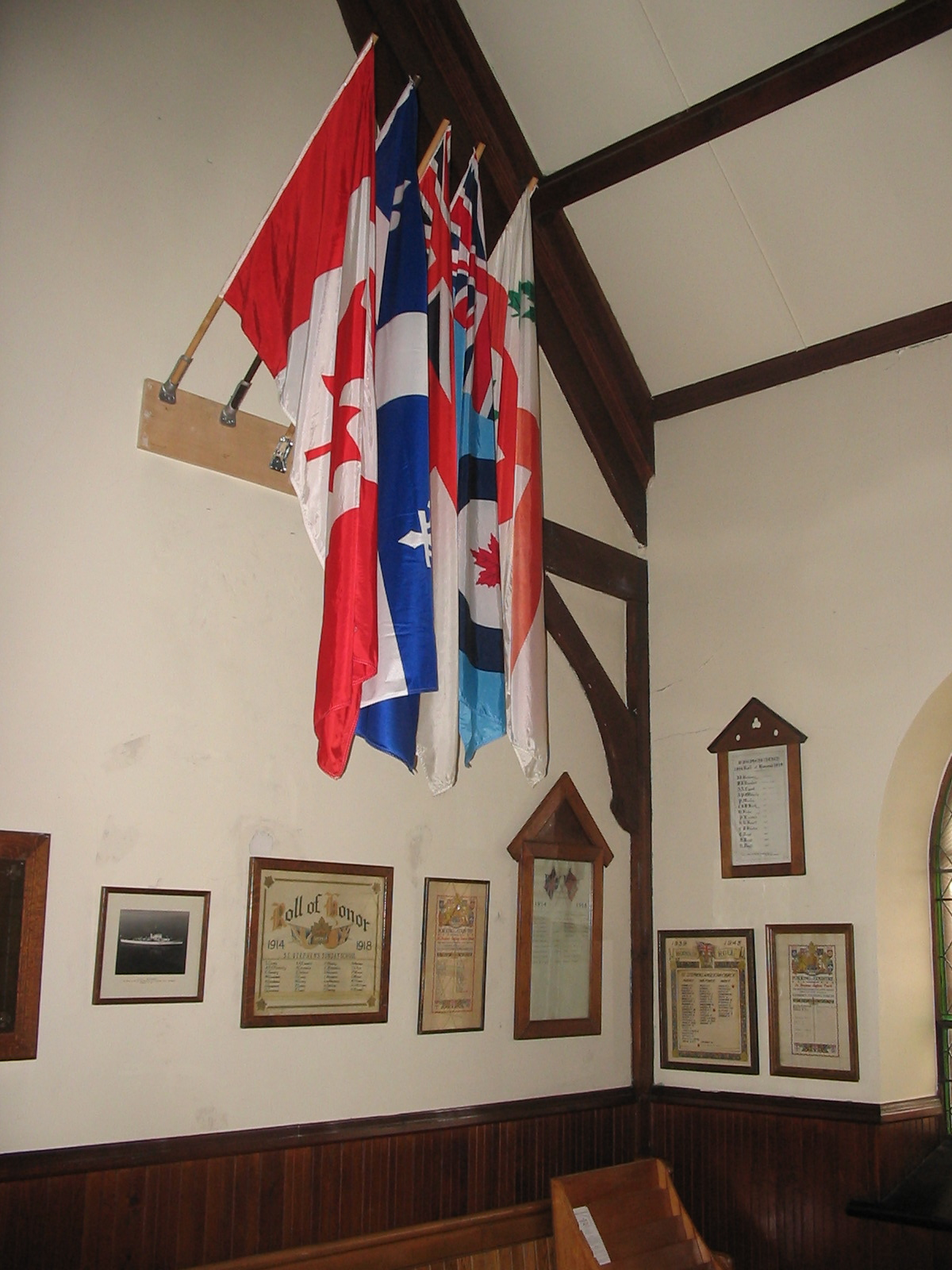
The church's Veterans' Memorial

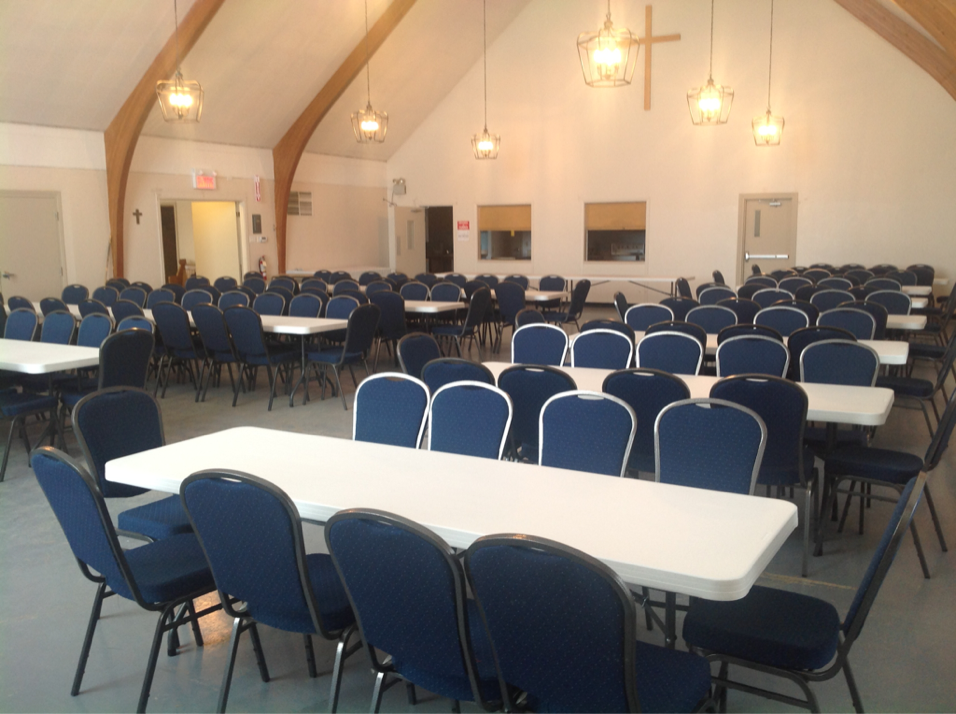
The interior of the Toope Memorial Hall

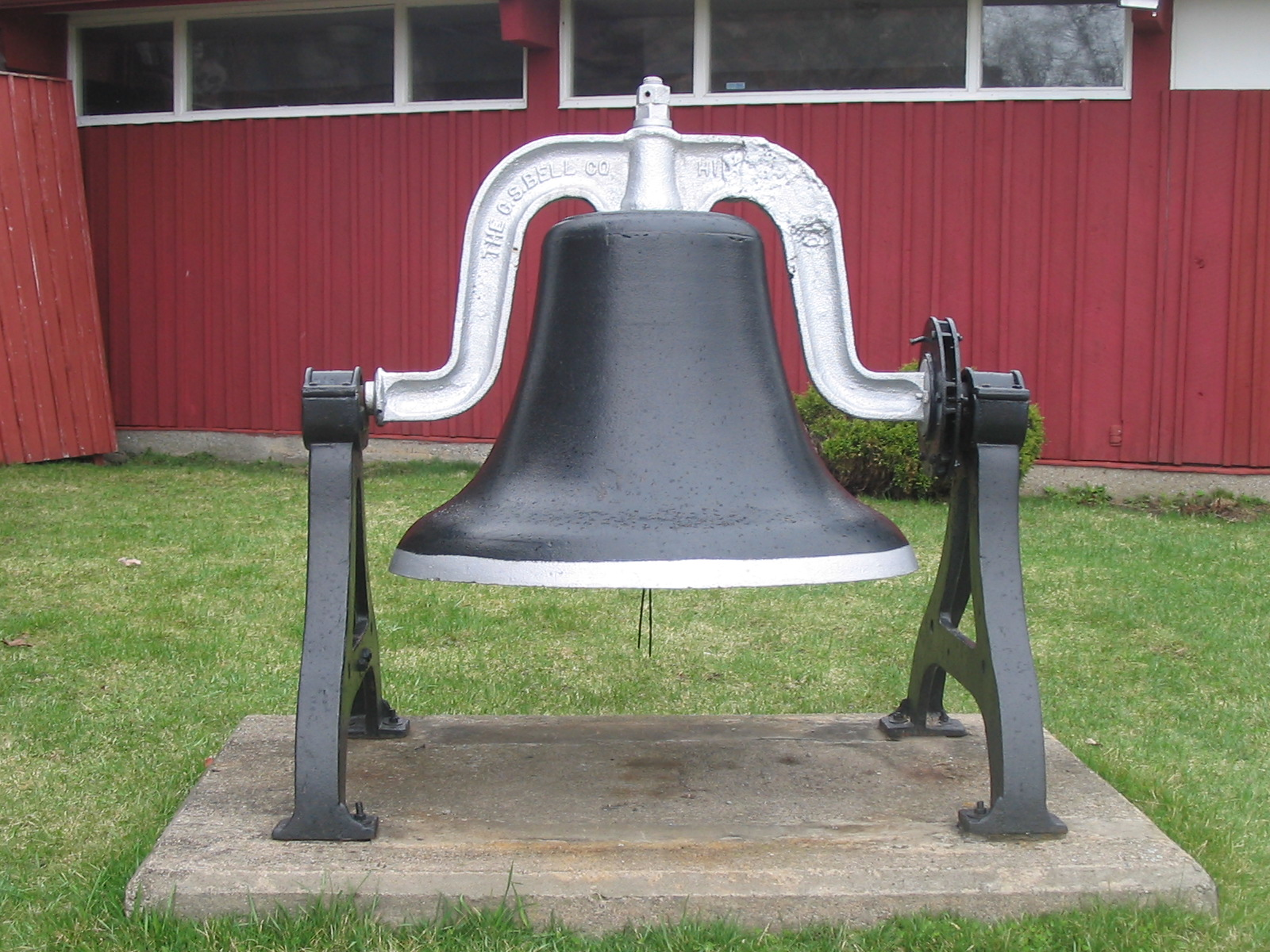
The church bell was removed from the battlement in the late 1960s. It now sits on the church lawn.

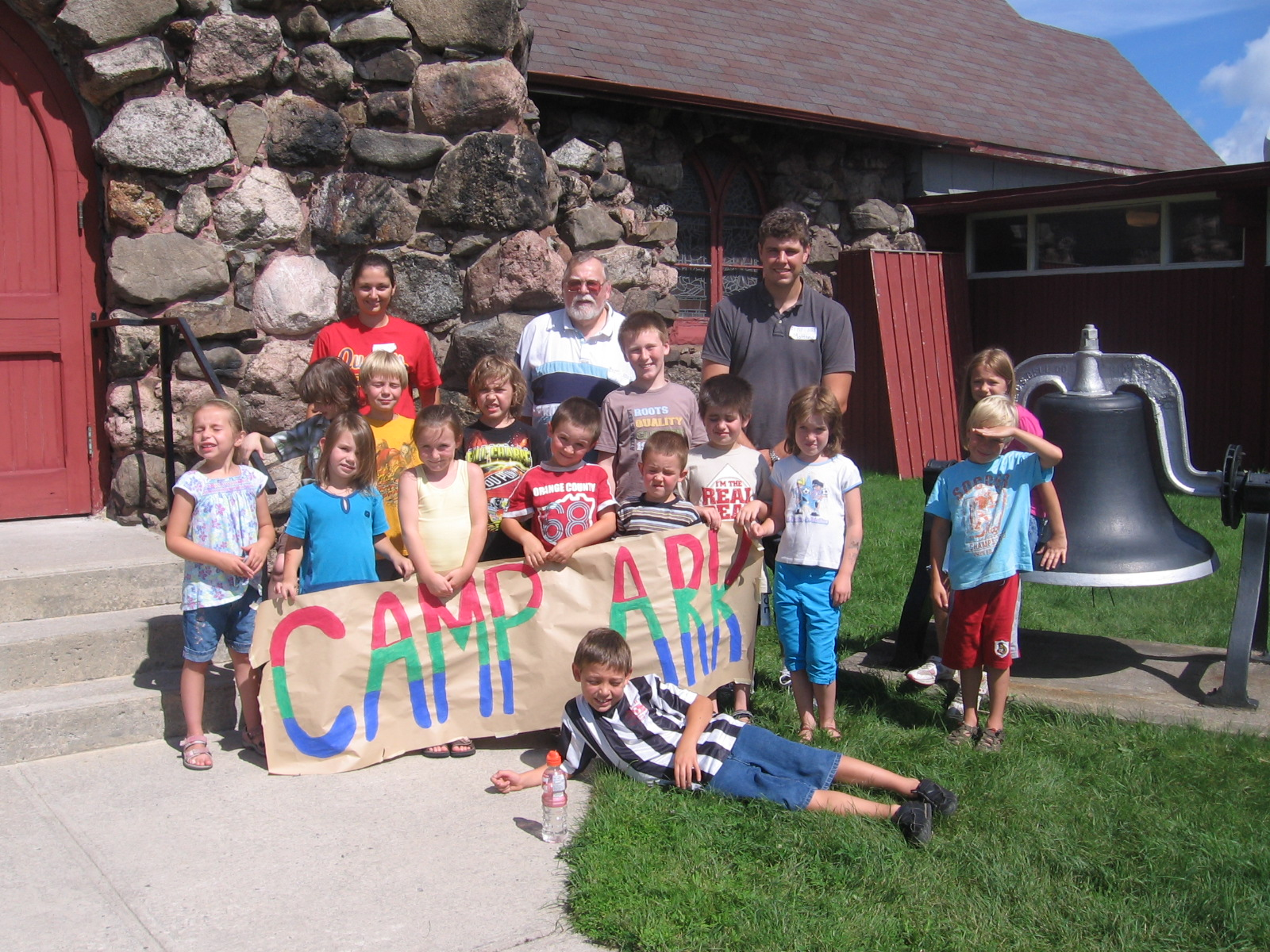
The group photo from Camp ARK, 2010

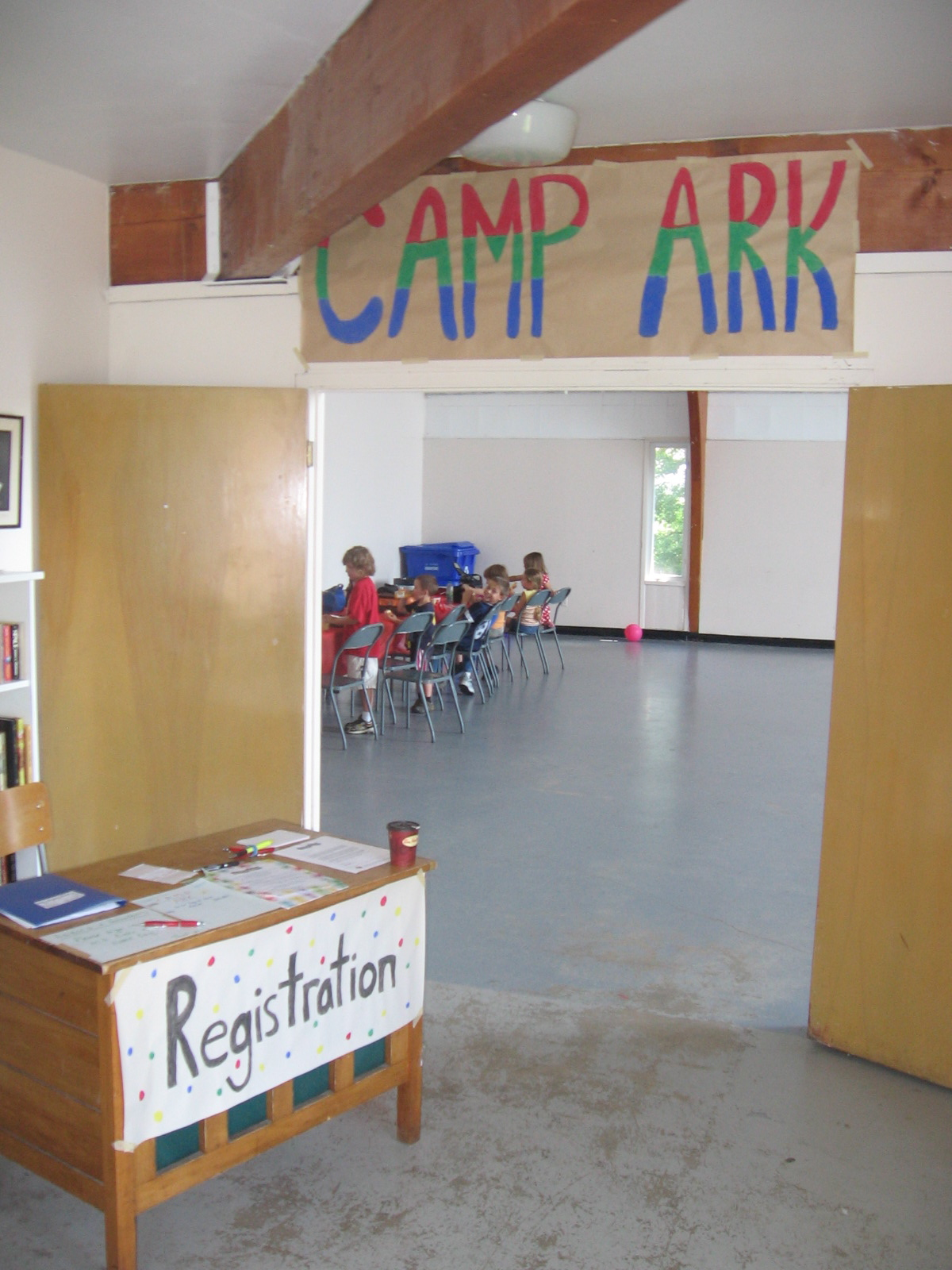
The entrance to Camp ARK, in the church hall

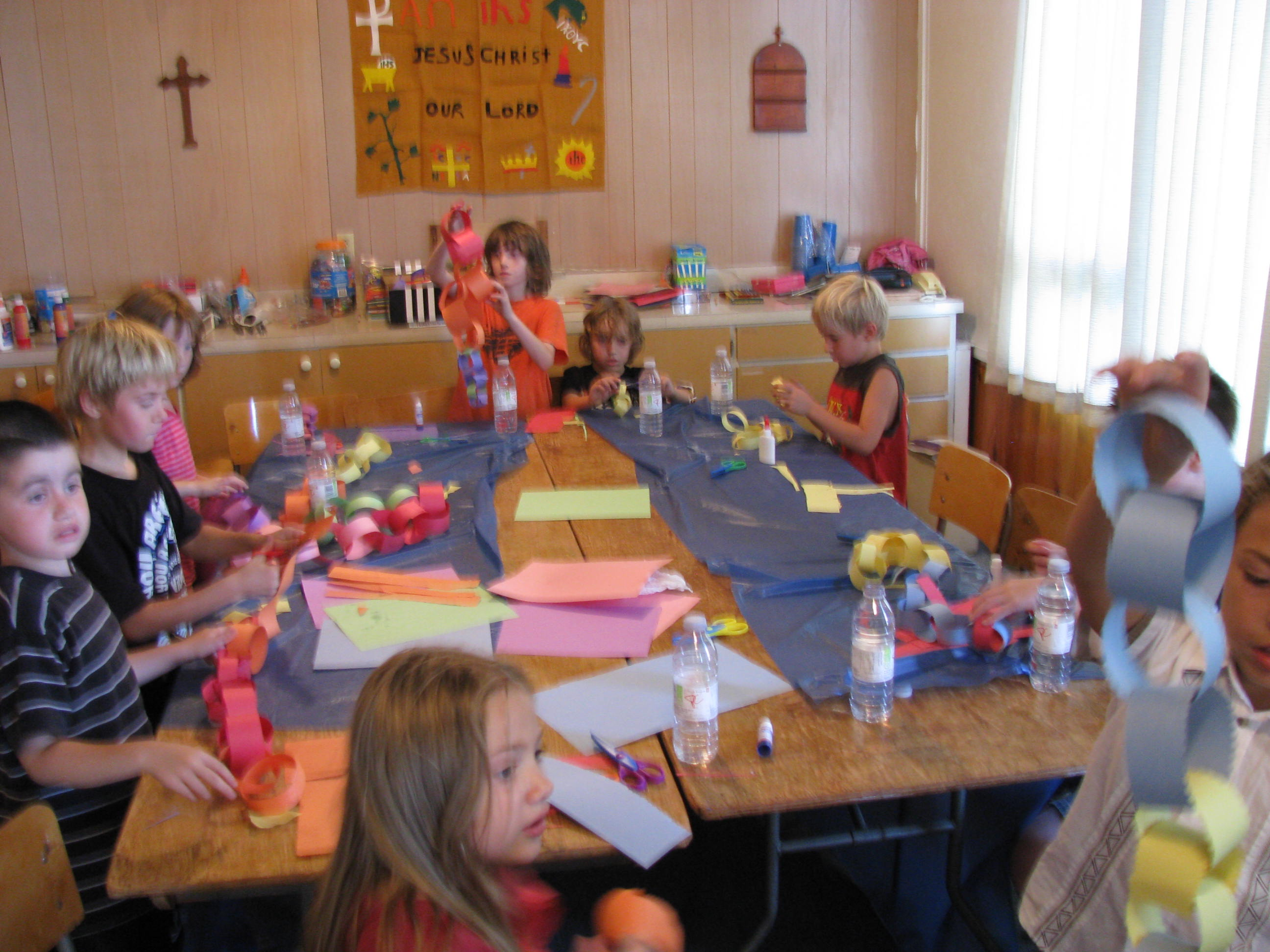
2010 Camp ARK campers working hard at crafts

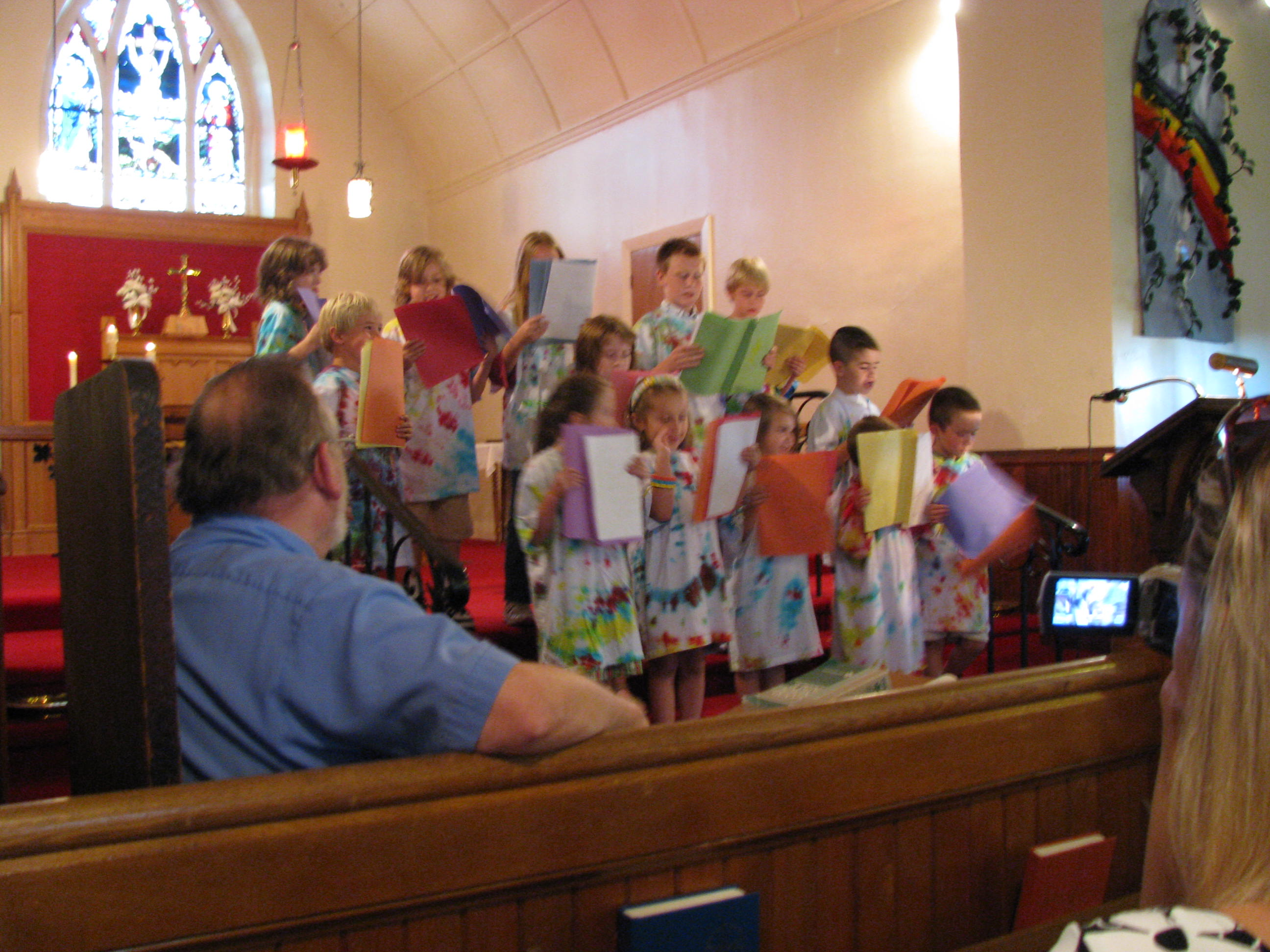
2010 Camp ARK campers performing at the closing service

== See also ==
- Anglican Diocese of Ottawa
- St. Thomas Anglican Church, Silver Creek, Quebec
- Anglican Church of Canada
- Anglican Communion
