= St. Stephen's Church, Beit Jimal =

St. Stephen's Church
- כנסיית סנט סטפן; Ecclesia S. Stephani
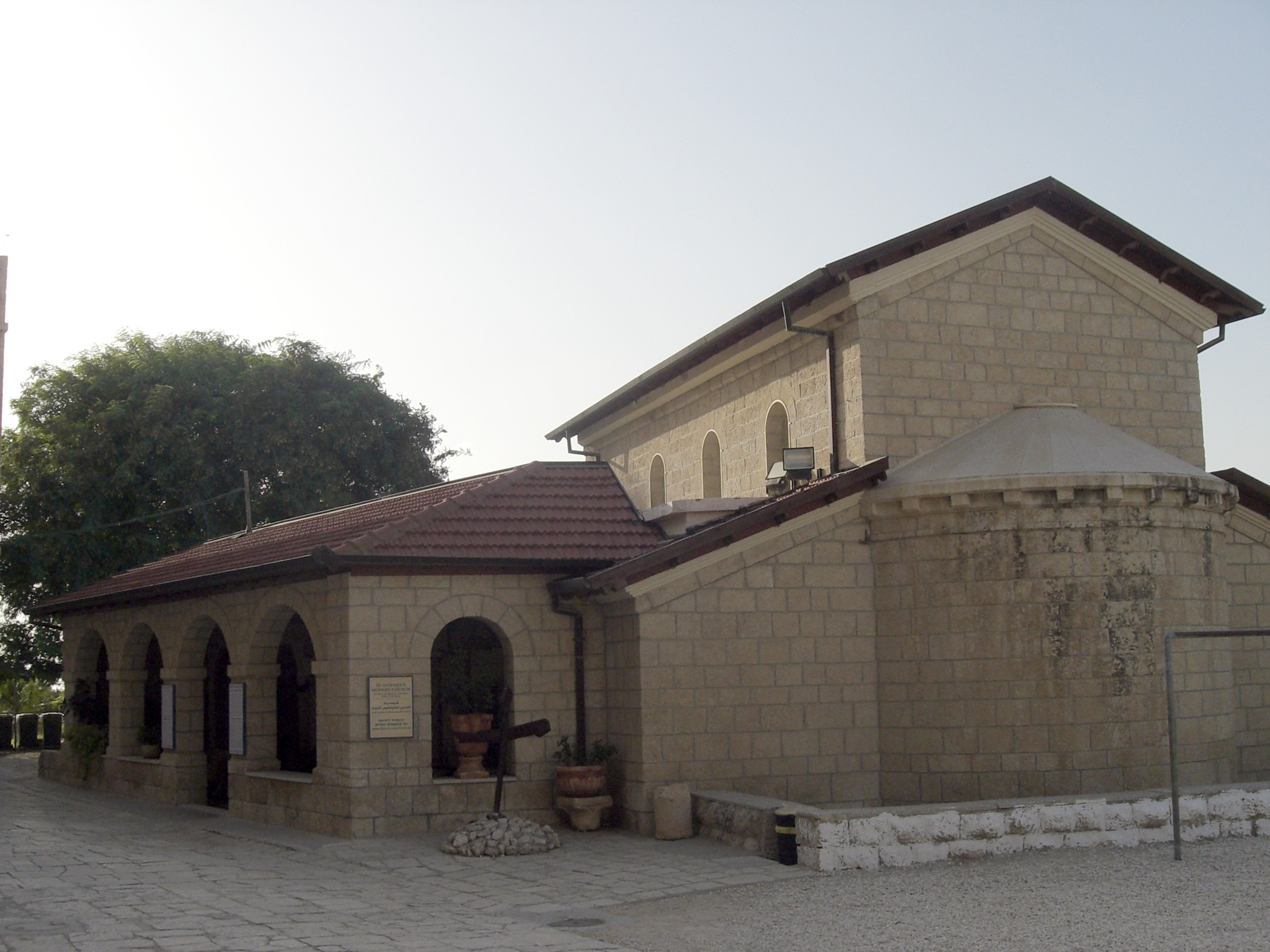
- St. Stephen's Church
- 31.7254°N 34.9757°E
- Location: Beit Jimal
- Country: Israel
- Denomination: Roman Catholic Church

The St. Stephen's Church (Hebrew: כנסיית סנט סטפן; Latin: Ecclesia S. Stephani) is a church in Beit Jimal, a Catholic monastery run by Salesian monks near Beit Shemesh in present-day Israel.

St. Stephen's is under the jurisdiction of the Latin Patriarchate of Jerusalem (Patriarchatus Hierosolymitanus Latinorum) which was established in its modern form in 1847 by Pope Pius IX. It was built in 1930 on the ruins of a Byzantine church of the 5th century that had been discovered in 1916.

It is dedicated to the first Christian martyr, who was stoned to death in Jerusalem in 34-35 AD (Acts 6–7), and by tradition was first buried at Beit Jimal.

One of its stained glass windows bears the inscription "Crucifixus etiam pro nobis sub Pontio Pilato", which is Latin meaning "It was also crucified for us under Pontius Pilate". Another inscription, on the roof, says "Pater dimitte illis", which means "Father, forgive them".

== gallery ==
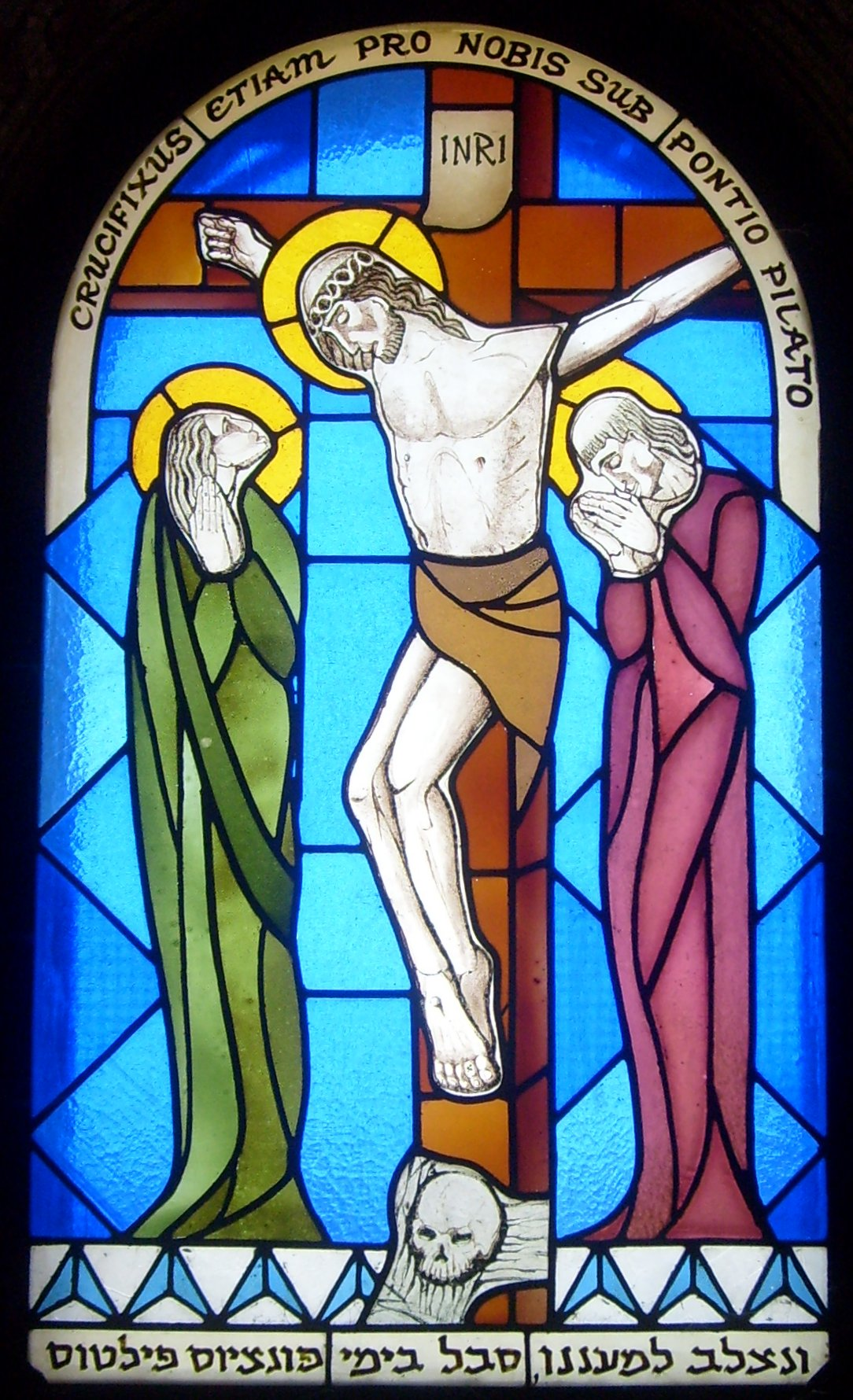
One of the stained glass windows with an inscription in Latin

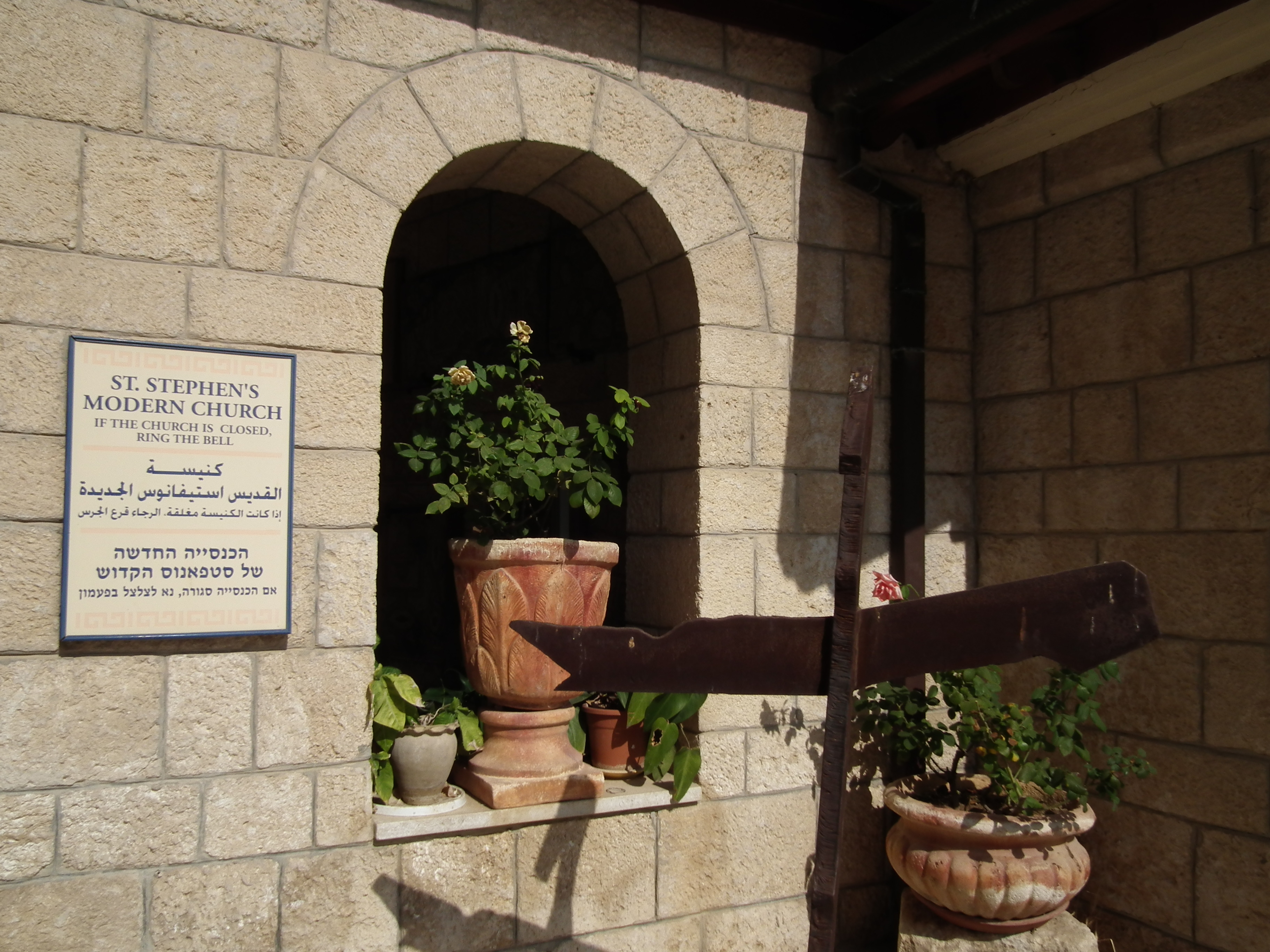
Description of the Church in English, Hebrew and Arabic

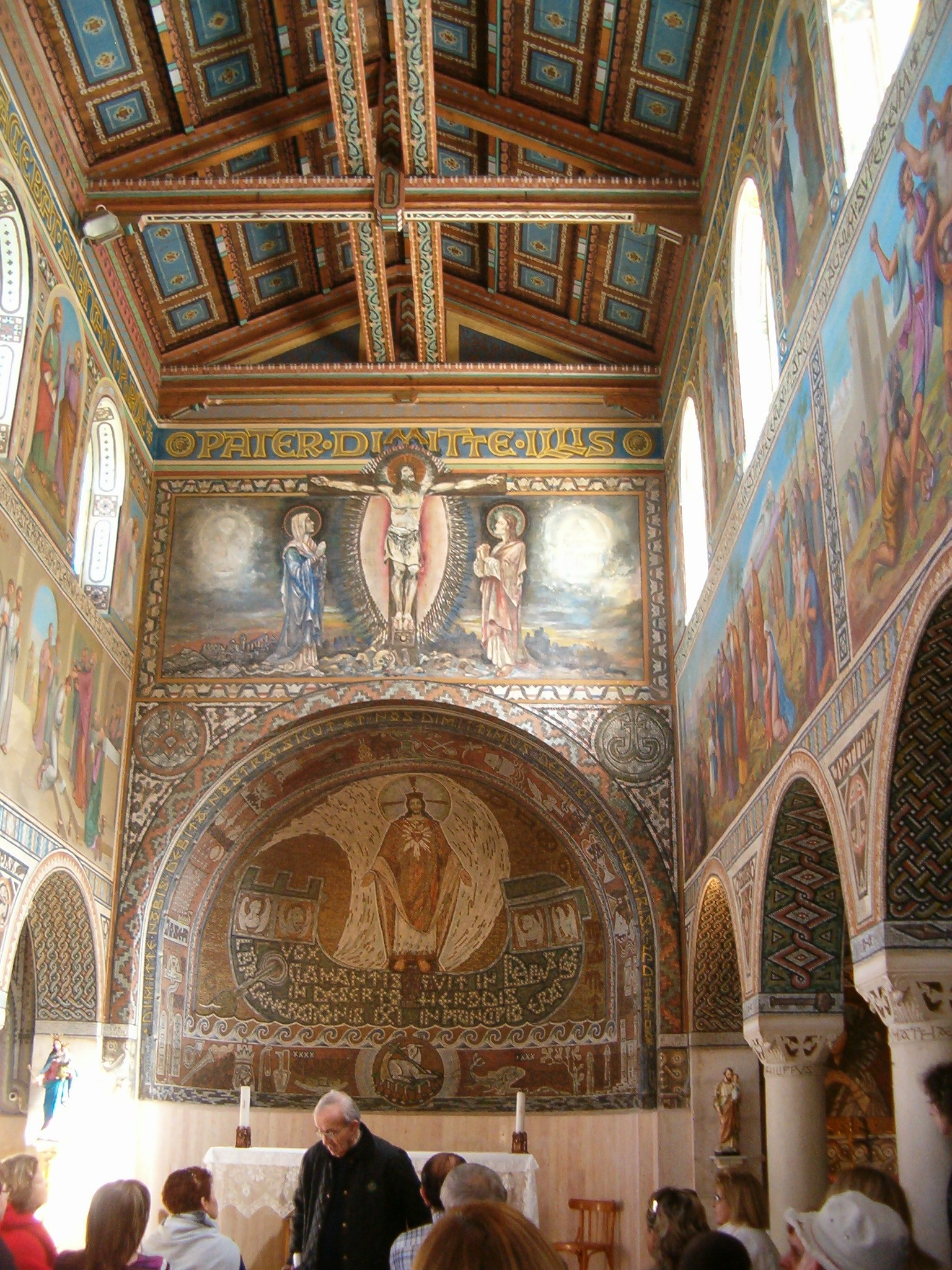
Latin inscription on the ceiling

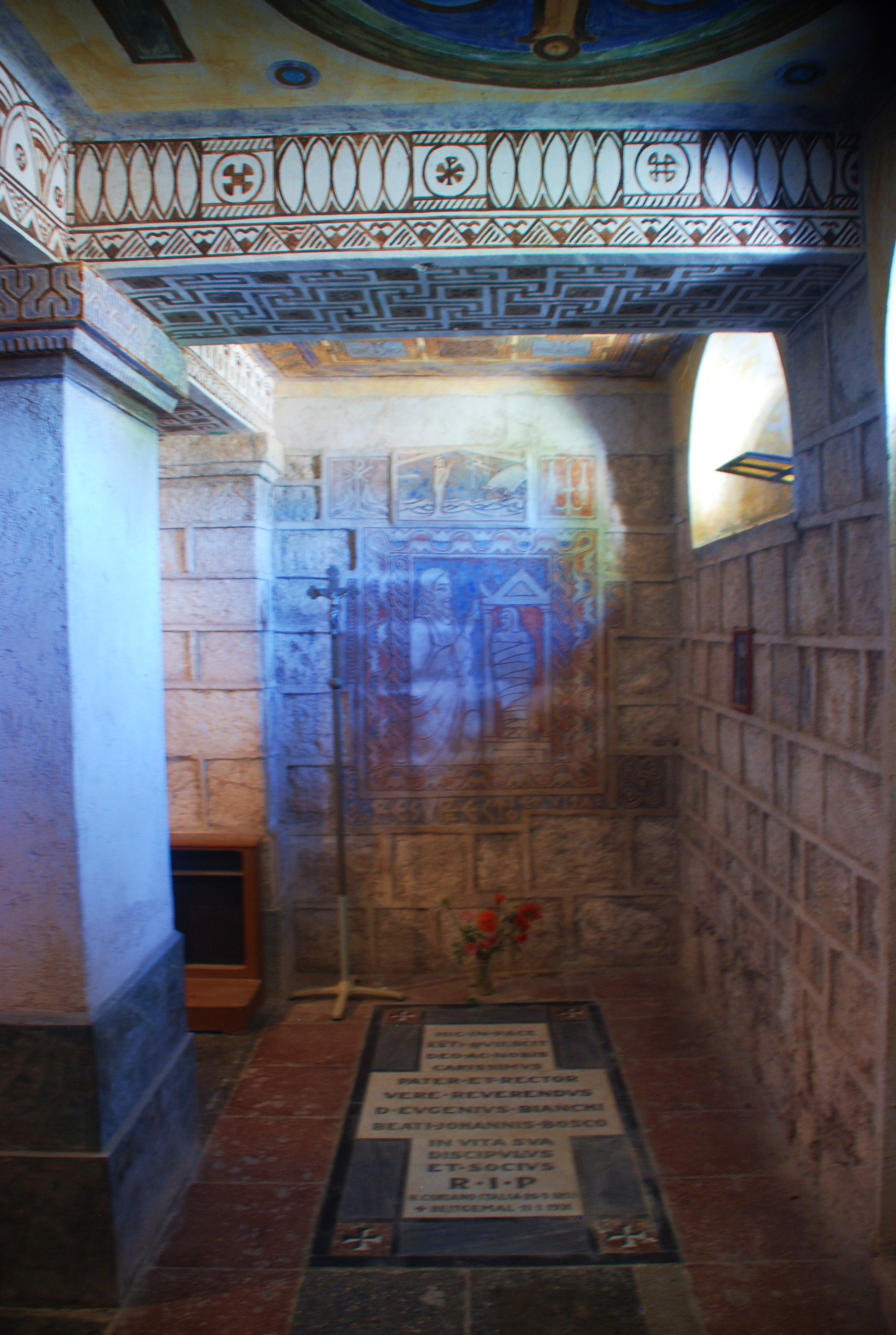
One of the tombs in the temple

== See also ==
- Roman Catholicism in Israel
- Latin Patriarchate of Jerusalem
