= Church of St. Stephen Harding =

Church of St. Stephen Harding may refer to:

- Church of St. Stephen Harding in Apátistvánfalva, Vendvidék, Hungary
- St Thomas Aquinas & St Stephen Harding Church, Market Drayton, England
