= List of tributaries of the Loire =

The river Loire in France has numerous tributaries, which include the following rivers (in order, going upstream):

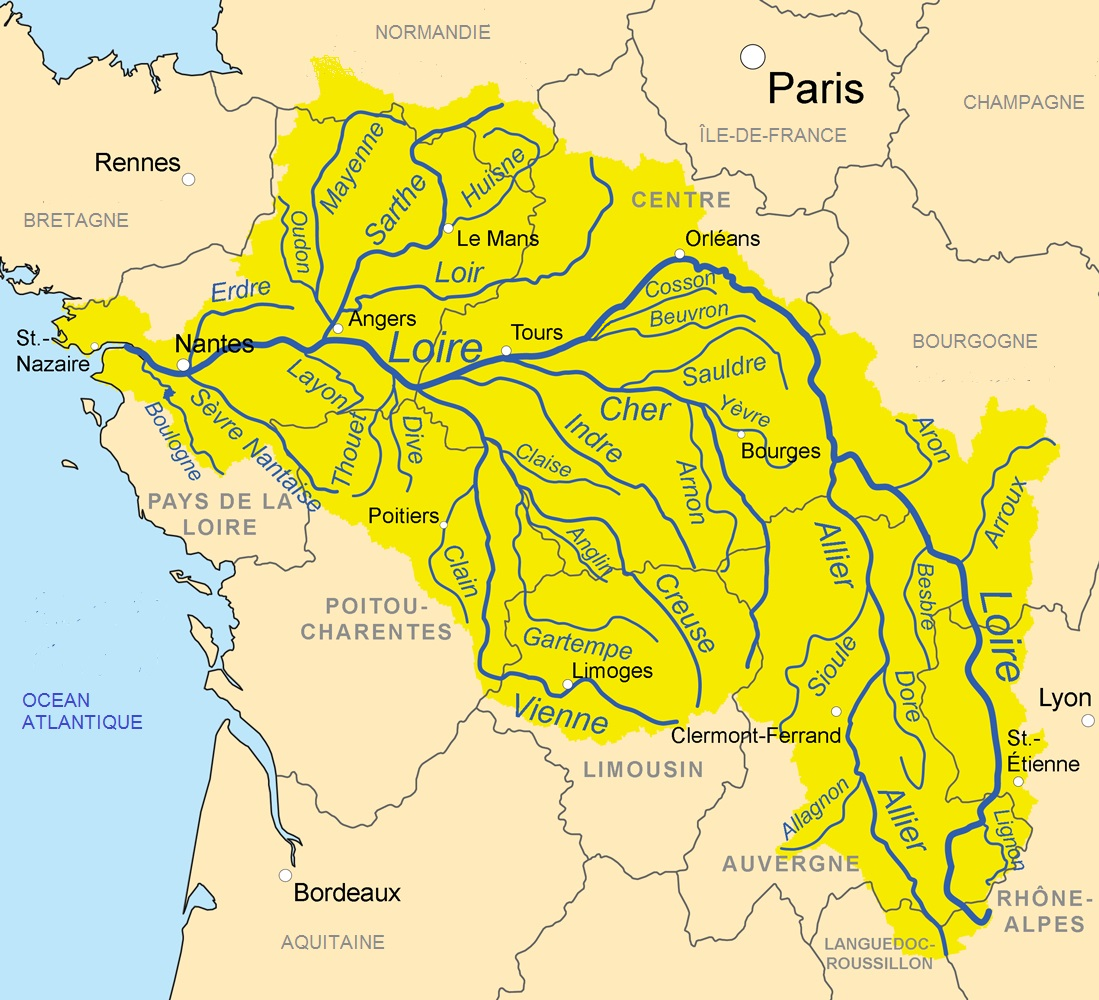
Map of the Loire basin showing the major tributaries

- Acheneau
  - Boulogne
- Sèvre Nantaise (in Nantes)
- Erdre (in Nantes)
- Èvre (in Le Marillais)
- Layon (in Chalonnes-sur-Loire)
- Maine (near Angers)
  - Mayenne (near Angers)
    - Oudon (in Le Lion-d'Angers)
      - Verzée (in Segré)
    - Ernée (in Saint-Jean-sur-Mayenne)
  - Sarthe (near Angers)
    - Loir (north of Angers)
      - Braye (in Pont-de-Braye)
      - Aigre (near Cloyes-sur-le-Loir)
      - Yerre (near Cloyes-sur-le-Loir)
      - Conie (near Châteaudun)
      - Ozanne (in Bonneval)
    - Vaige (in Sablé-sur-Sarthe)
    - Vègre (in Avoise)
    - Huisne (in Le Mans)
- Authion (in Sainte-Gemmes-sur-Loire)
- Thouet (near Saumur)
  - Dive (near Saint-Just-sur-Dive)
  - Losse (near Montreuil-Bellay)
  - Argenton (near Saint-Martin-de-Sanzay)
  - Thouaret (near Taizé)
  - Cébron (near Saint-Loup-sur-Thouet)
  - Palais (near Parthenay)
  - Viette (near Parthenay)
- Vienne (in Candes-Saint-Martin)
  - Creuse (north of Châtellerault)
    - Gartempe (in La Roche-Posay)
      - Anglin (in Angles-sur-l'Anglin)
        - Salleron (in Ingrandes)
        - Benaize (in Saint-Hilaire-sur-Benaize)
        - Abloux (in Prissac)
      - Brame (in Darnac)
      - Semme (in Droux)
    - Petite Creuse (in Fresselines)
  - Clain (in Châtellerault)
    - Clouère (in Château-Larcher)
  - Briance (in Condat-sur-Vienne)
  - Taurion (in Saint-Priest-Taurion)
- Indre (east of Candes-Saint-Martin)
  - Indrois (in Azay-sur-Indre)
- Cher (in Villandry)
  - Sauldre (in Selles-sur-Cher)
    - Rère (in Villeherviers)
  - Arnon (near Vierzon)
  - Yèvre (in Vierzon)
    - Auron (in Bourges)
    - Airain (in Savigny-en-Septaine)
  - Tardes (in Évaux-les-Bains)
    - Voueize (in Chambon-sur-Voueize)
- Beuvron (in Chaumont-sur-Loire)
  - Cosson (in Candé-sur-Beuvron)
- Loiret (in Orléans)
- Vauvise (in Saint-Satur)

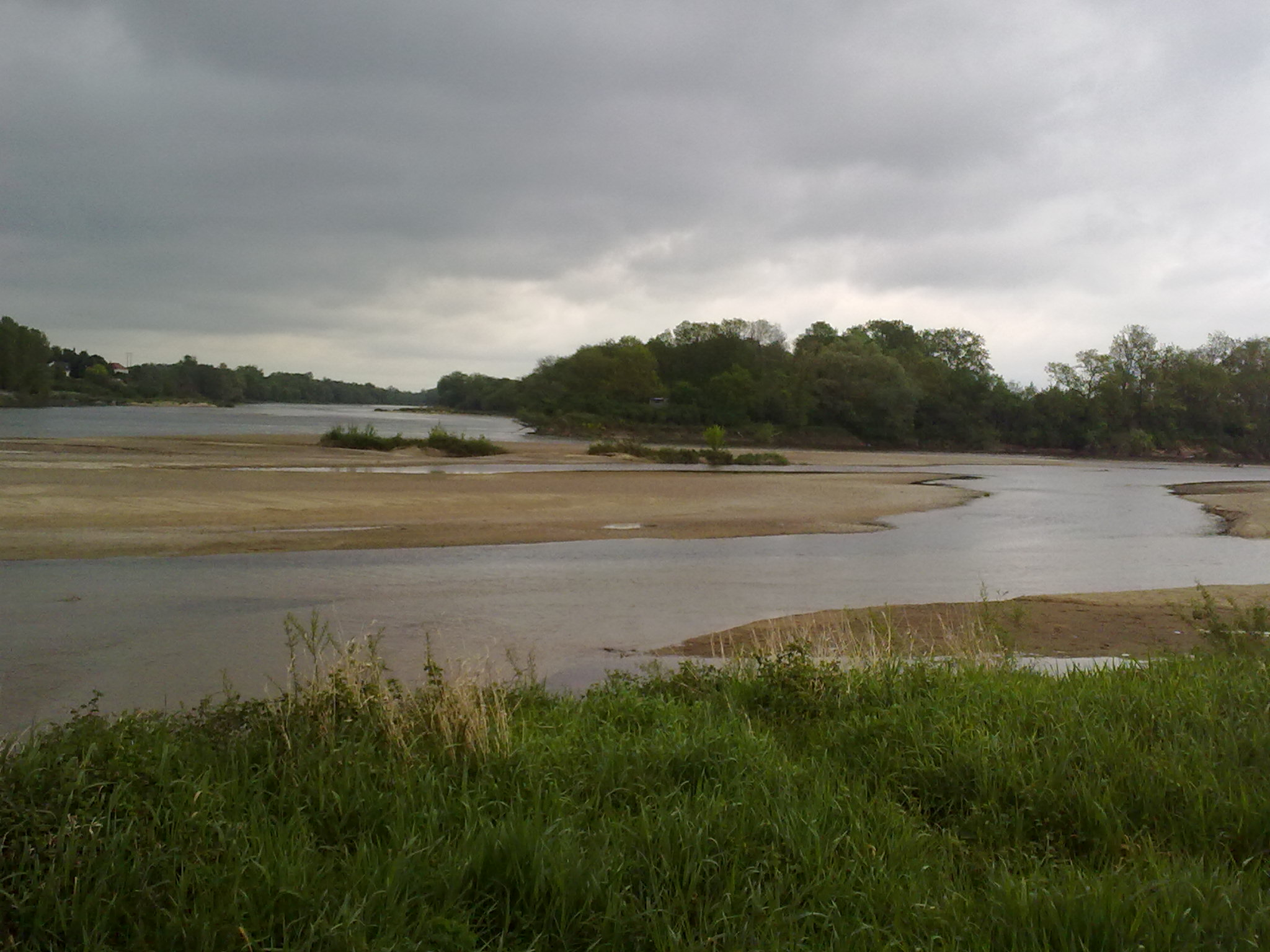
Confluence of the Allier and the Loire

- Allier (near Nevers)
  - Sioule (in La Ferté-Hauterive)
    - Bouble (in Saint-Pourçain-sur-Sioule)
  - Dore (near Puy-Guillaume)
  - Alagnon (near Jumeaux)
  - Senouire (near Brioude)
  - Ance (in Monistrol-d'Allier)
  - Chapeauroux (in Saint-Christophe-d'Allier)
- Nièvre (in Nevers)
- Acolin (near Decize)
- Aron (in Decize)
  - Alène (in Cercy-la-Tour)
- Besbre (near Dompierre-sur-Besbre)
- Arroux (in Digoin)
  - Bourbince (in Digoin)
- Arconce (in Varenne-Saint-Germain)
- Lignon du Forez (in Feurs)
- Furan (in Andrézieux-Bouthéon)
- Ondaine (in Unieux)
- Lignon du Velay (in Monistrol-sur-Loire)
