= List of rivers of France =

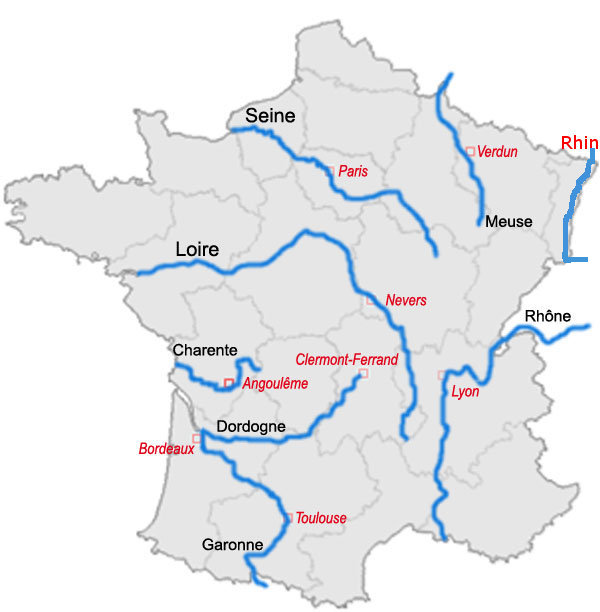

This is a list of rivers that are at least partially in France. The rivers are grouped by sea or ocean. The rivers flowing into the sea are sorted along the coast. Rivers flowing into other rivers are listed by the rivers they flow into. Some rivers (e.g. Sûre/Sauer) do not flow through France themselves, but they are mentioned for having French tributaries. They are given in italics. For clarity, only rivers that are longer than 50 km (or have longer tributaries) are shown.

In French, rivers are traditionally classified either as fleuves when they flow into the sea (or into a desert or lake), or as rivières when they flow into another river. The fleuves are shown in bold.

For an alphabetical overview of rivers of France, see the category Rivers of France.

== Tributary list ==
=== North Sea ===
The rivers in this section are sorted north-east (Netherlands) to south-west (Calais).

- **Rhine/Rhin** (main branch at Hook of Holland, Netherlands)
  - Moselle (in Koblenz, Germany)
    - Saar/Sarre (near Konz, Germany)
      - Nied (in Rehlingen-Siersburg, Germany)
      - Blies (in Sarreguemines)
    - Sauer/Sûre (in Wasserbillig, Luxembourg)
      - Alzette (in Ettelbruck, Luxembourg)
    - Orne (Moselle) (near Mondelange)
    - Seille (in Metz)
    - Rupt de Mad (in Arnaville)
    - Meurthe (in Frouard)
      - Mortagne (in Mont-sur-Meurthe)
    - Madon (in Pont-Saint-Vincent)
    - Vologne (in Pouxeux)
  - Lauter (in Lauterbourg)
  - Moder (in Neuhaeusel)
  - Sauer (in Seltz)
  - Ill (near La Wantzenau)
    - Thur (near Ensisheim)
- **Meuse** (main branch near Hellevoetsluis, Netherlands)
  - Faux (in Revin, France)
  - Sambre (in Namur, Belgium)
  - Semois/Semoy (in Monthermé)
  - Sormonne (in Warcq)
  - Bar (near Dom-le-Mesnil)
  - Chiers (in Bazeilles)
    - Othain (in Montmédy)
- **Scheldt/Escaut** (near Vlissingen, Netherlands)
  - Lys (in Ghent, Belgium)
    - Deûle (in Deûlémont)
  - Scarpe (in Mortagne-du-Nord)
  - Haine (in Condé-sur-l'Escaut)
- **Yser** (in Nieuwpoort, Belgium)
- **Aa** (in Gravelines)

=== English Channel ===
The rivers in this section are sorted east (Calais) to west (Brest).

- **Slack** (near Fort Mahon)
- **Canche** (in Étaples)
- **Authie** (near Berck)
- **Somme** (near Abbeville)
  - Avre (in Amiens)
- **Bresle** (in Le Tréport)
- **Arques** (in Dieppe)
  - Béthune (in Arques-la-Bataille)
- **Seine** (in Le Havre)
  - Risle (in Berville-sur-Mer)
    - Charentonne (near Bernay)
  - Eure (in Pont-de-l'Arche)
    - Iton (near Louviers)
    - Avre (near Dreux)
  - Andelle (in Pîtres)
  - Epte (near Vernon)
  - Oise (in Conflans-Sainte-Honorine, west of Paris)
    - Thérain (in Creil)
    - Aisne (in Compiègne)
      - Vesle (in Condé-sur-Aisne)
      - Suippe (in Condé-sur-Suippe)
      - Aire (near Grandpré)
    - Ailette (in Quierzy)
    - Serre (in La Fère)
  - Marne (in Ivry-sur-Seine, south-east of Paris)
    - Grand Morin (near Meaux)
      - Aubetin (in Pommeuse)
    - Ourcq (near Lizy-sur-Ourcq)
    - Petit Morin (in La Ferté-sous-Jouarre)
    - Saulx (in Vitry-le-François)
      - Chée (in Vitry-en-Perthois)
      - Ornain (in Pargny-sur-Saulx)
    - Blaise (in Arrigny)
  - Orge (in Athis-Mons)
  - Essonne (in Corbeil-Essonnes)
    - Juine (in Ballancourt-sur-Essonne)
  - Loing (near Moret-sur-Loing)
    - Ouanne (in Conflans-sur-Loing)
    - Lunain (in Épisy)
  - Yonne (in Montereau-Fault-Yonne)
    - Armançon (in Migennes)
    - Serein (in Bassou)
    - Cure (near Vermenton)
  - Aube (near Romilly-sur-Seine)
    - Voire (in Chalette-sur-Voire)
    - Aujon (in Longchamp-sur-Aujon)
  - Barse (in Troyes)
  - Ource (in Bar-sur-Seine)
- **Touques** (in Deauville)
- **Dives** (in Cabourg)
- **Orne** (in Ouistreham)
- **Vire** (near Isigny-sur-Mer)
  - Aure (in Isigny-sur-Mer)
- **Douve** (near Carentan)
- **Sée** (near Avranches)
- **Sélune** (near Avranches)
- **Couesnon** (near Mont-Saint-Michel)
- **Rance** (in Saint-Malo)
- **Trieux** (near Lézardrieux)

=== Atlantic Ocean ===
The rivers in this section are sorted north (Brest) to south (Spain).

- **Élorn** (near Brest)
- **Aulne** (in Logonna-Daoulas)
- **Odet** (near Quimper)
- **Laïta** (in Guidel)
  - Ellé (in Quimperlé)
- **Blavet** (in Lorient)
  - Ével (in Baud, Morbihan)
- **Vilaine** (in Pénestin)
  - Oust (in Redon)
    - Arz (in Saint-Jean-la-Poterie)
    - Aff (in Glénac)
  - Don (in Massérac)
  - Chère (in Sainte-Anne-sur-Vilaine)
  - Semnon (in Bourg-des-Comptes)
  - Meu (in Goven)
  - Ille (in Rennes)
- **Loire** (in Saint-Nazaire)
  - Sèvre Nantaise (in Nantes)
  - Erdre (in Nantes)
  - Èvre (in Le Marillais)
  - Layon (in Chalonnes-sur-Loire)
  - Maine (near Angers)
    - Mayenne (near Angers)
      - Oudon (in Le Lion-d'Angers)
        - Verzée (in Segré)
      - Ernée (in Saint-Jean-sur-Mayenne)
    - Sarthe (near Angers)
      - Loir (north of Angers)
        - Braye (in Lavenay)
      - Vaige (in Sablé-sur-Sarthe)
      - Vègre (in Avoise)
      - Huisne (in Le Mans)
  - Thouet (in Saumur)
    - Dive (near Saint-Just-sur-Dive)
    - Argenton (near Saint-Martin-de-Sanzay)
    - Thouaret (near Thouars)
  - Vienne (in Candes-Saint-Martin)
    - Creuse (north of Châtellerault)
      - Gartempe (in La Roche-Posay)
        - Anglin (in Angles-sur-l'Anglin)
          - Salleron (in Ingrandes)
          - Benaize (in Saint-Hilaire-sur-Benaize)
        - Brame (in Darnac)
        - Semme (in Droux)
      - Bouzanne (in Le Pont-Chrétien-Chabenet)
      - Petite Creuse (in Fresselines)
    - Clain (in Châtellerault)
      - Clouère (in Château-Larcher)
    - Briance (in Condat-sur-Vienne)
    - Taurion (in Saint-Priest-Taurion)
  - Indre (in Avoine)
    - Indrois (in Azay-sur-Indre)
  - Cher (in Villandry)
    - Sauldre (in Selles-sur-Cher)
      - Rère (in Villeherviers)
    - Arnon (near Vierzon)
    - Yèvre (in Vierzon)
      - Auron (in Bourges)
    - Tardes (in Évaux-les-Bains)
      - Voueize (in Chambon-sur-Voueize)
  - Beuvron (in Chaumont-sur-Loire)
    - Cosson (in Candé-sur-Beuvron)
  - Vauvise (in Saint-Satur)
  - Allier (near Nevers)
    - Sioule (in La Ferté-Hauterive)
      - Bouble (in Saint-Pourçain-sur-Sioule)
    - Dore (near Puy-Guillaume)
    - Alagnon (near Jumeaux)
    - Senouire (near Brioude)
    - Chapeauroux (in Saint-Christophe-d'Allier)
  - Acolin (near Decize)
  - Aron (in Decize)
    - Alène (in Cercy-la-Tour)
  - Besbre (near Dompierre-sur-Besbre)
  - Arroux (in Digoin)
    - Bourbince (in Digoin)
  - Arconce (in Varenne-Saint-Germain)
  - Lignon du Forez (in Feurs)
  - Lignon du Velay (in Monistrol-sur-Loire)
- **Lay** (in L'Aiguillon-sur-Mer)
  - Yon (in Le Champ-Saint-Père)
  - Smagne (in Mareuil-sur-Lay-Dissais)
- **Sèvre Niortaise** (in Marans)
  - Vendée (in Marans)
- **Charente** (near Rochefort)
  - Boutonne (in Cabariot)
  - Seugne (near Courcoury)
  - Bonnieure (near Mansle)
    - Tardoire (in Saint-Ciers-sur-Bonnieure)
      - Bandiat (in Agris)
- **Seudre** (in Marennes)
- **Dordogne** (into the Gironde estuary near Ambès)
  - Isle (in Libourne)
    - Dronne (in Coutras)
      - Lizonne (in Saint-Séverin)
      - Côle (in Condat-sur-Trincou)
    - Beauronne (near Mussidan)
    - Auvézère (in Bassillac)
    - Loue (in Coulaures)
  - Vézère (near Le Bugue)
    - Corrèze (in Brive-la-Gaillarde)
  - Céou (in Castelnaud-la-Chapelle)
  - Cère (near Bretenoux)
  - Maronne (in Argentat)
  - Luzège (in Laval-sur-Luzège)
  - Triouzoune (in Sérandon)
  - Diège (in Roche-le-Peyroux)
  - Rhue (in Bort-les-Orgues)
  - Chavanon (in Confolent-Port-Dieu)
- **Garonne** (into the Gironde estuary near Ambès)
  - Ciron (in Barsac)
  - Dropt (in Caudrot)
  - Lot (near Aiguillon)
    - Lède (near Villeneuve-sur-Lot)
    - Célé (near Cabrerets)
    - Truyère (in Entraygues-sur-Truyère)
    - Colagne (in Le Monastier-Pin-Moriès)
  - Baïse (near Aiguillon)
    - Gélise (in Lavardac)
      - Osse (in Nérac)
      - Auzoue (in Mézin)
    - Petite Baïse (in L'Isle-de-Noé)
  - Gers (near Agen)
  - Séoune (in Lafox)
  - Auroue (in Saint-Nicolas-de-la-Balerme)
  - Barguelonne (in Golfech)
  - Arrats (near Valence)
  - Tarn (near Castelsarrasin)
    - Aveyron (near Montauban)
      - Vère (in Bruniquel)
      - Cérou (in Milhars)
      - Viaur (in Laguépie)
        - Céor (in Saint-Just-sur-Viaur)
      - Tescou (near Montauban)
    - Agout (in Saint-Sulpice-la-Pointe)
      - Dadou (in Ambres)
      - Thoré (in Castres)
      - Gijou (in Vabre)
    - Dourdou de Camarès (in Broquiès)
    - Dourbie (in Millau)
  - Gimone (near Castelsarrasin)
  - Save (in Grenade)
    - Gesse (in Espaon)
  - Hers-Mort (near Grenade)
  - Touch (in Toulouse)
  - Ariège (in Toulouse)
    - Lèze (in Labarthe-sur-Lèze)
    - Hers-Vif (in Cintegabelle)
  - Louge (in Muret)
  - Arize (in Carbonne)
  - Salat (in Boussens)
  - Neste (in Montréjeau)
- **Eyre/Leyre** (near Arcachon)
- **Adour** (near Bayonne)
  - Nive (in Bayonne)
  - Bidouze (in Guiche)
  - Gaves réunis (near Peyrehorade)
    - Gave de Pau (in Peyrehorade)
    - Gave d'Oloron (in Peyrehorade)
      - Saison (near Sauveterre-de-Béarn)
      - Gave d'Aspe (in Oloron-Sainte-Marie)
  - Luy (near Tercis-les-Bains)
    - Luy de France (near Gaujacq)
    - Luy de Béarn (near Gaujacq)
  - Louts (near Hinx)
  - Midouze (near Pontonx-sur-l'Adour)
    - Douze (in Mont-de-Marsan)
    - Midou (in Mont-de-Marsan)
  - Gabas (in Toulouzette)
  - Léez (near Aire-sur-l'Adour)
  - Arros (near Riscle)
    - Bouès (near Marciac)
  - Échez (in Maubourguet)
- **Bidasoa** (in Hendaye)

=== Mediterranean Sea ===
The rivers in this section are sorted west (Spain) to east (Italy).

- **Ebro/Èbre** (near Deltebre, Spain)
  - Segre (in Mequinenza, Spain)
- **Tech** (near Argelès-sur-Mer)
- **Têt** (near Perpignan)
- **Agly** (in Le Barcarès)
- **Aude** (near Narbonne)
  - Orbieu (in Raissac-d'Aude)
- **Orb** (in Valras-Plage)
- **Hérault** (near Agde)
  - Vis (near Ganges)
- **Vidourle** (in Le Grau-du-Roi)
- **Rhône** (in Port-Saint-Louis-du-Rhône)
  - Gard or Gardon (in Beaucaire)
  - Durance (in Avignon)
    - Calavon (near Caumont-sur-Durance)
    - Verdon (in Saint-Paul-lès-Durance)
    - Asse (in Valensole)
    - Bléone (in Les Mées)
    - Buëch (in Sisteron)
    - Ubaye (near La Bréole)
    - Guil (in Guillestre)
  - Ouvèze (near Avignon)
  - Cèze (in Codolet)
  - Ardèche (in Pont-Saint-Esprit)
    - Chassezac (in Saint-Alban-Auriolles)
  - Drôme (in Loriol-sur-Drôme)
  - Eyrieux (in Beauchastel)
  - Isère (near Valence)
    - Drac (in Grenoble)
      - Romanche (near Vizille)
    - Arc (near Saint-Pierre-d'Albigny)
  - Galaure (in Saint-Vallier)
  - Saône (in Lyon)
    - Azergues (in Anse)
    - Chalaronne (in Saint-Didier-sur-Chalaronne)
    - Veyle (near Mâcon)
    - Reyssouze (near Pont-de-Vaux)
    - Seille (near Tournus)
      - Sâne Vive (in Brienne)
        - Sâne Morte (in Ménetreuil)
      - Solnan (in Louhans)
        - Vallière (in Louhans)
        - Sevron (in Varennes-Saint-Sauveur)
    - Grosne (in Marnay)
    - Doubs (in Verdun-sur-le-Doubs)
      - Loue (near Dole)
      - Allaine/Allan (near Montbéliard)
    - Ouche (in Saint-Jean-de-Losne)
    - Tille (near Auxonne)
    - Ognon (in Pontailler-sur-Saône)
    - Côney (in Corre)
  - Ain (near Pont-de-Chéruy)
    - Albarine (in Châtillon-la-Palud)
  - Bourbre (in Chavanoz)
  - Fier (in Seyssel)
    - Chéran (in Rumilly)
  - Arve (in Geneva, Switzerland)
- **Touloubre** (in Saint-Chamas via the Étang de Berre lagoon)
- **Arc** (near Berre-l'Étang via the Étang de Berre)
- **Argens** (in Fréjus)
- **Var** (in Saint-Laurent-du-Var)
  - Estéron (in Saint-Martin-du-Var)
  - Tinée (near Utelle)
- **Roya** (in Ventimiglia, Italy)

==== Corsica ====
The rivers in this section are listed counterclockwise around the Corsican coast starting from Cap Corse.

- **Golo** (near Bastia)
- **Tavignano** (in Aléria)
- **Taravo** (near Propriano)
- **Cavu** (near Zonza)

==== Po basin (Adriatic Sea) ====
- **Po/Pô** (near Venice, Italy)
  - Dora Riparia/Doire Ripaire (in Turin, Italy)
    - Cenischia/Cenise (in Susa, Italy)

== Longest rivers ==
The river lengths in the table below refer to the part of the rivers on French territory.

#	Name	Length	
#	Name	(km)	(mi)
1	Loire	1,006	625
2	Seine	776	482
3	Rhône^{a}	544	338
4	Garonne^{a}	529	329
5	Marne	514	319
6	Meuse^{a}	463	288
7	Lot	485	301
8	Dordogne	483	300
9	Saône	473	294
10	Doubs^{a}	430	270
11	Allier	421	262
12	Charente	381	237
13	Tarn	380	240
14	Cher	368	229
15	Vienne	363	226
16	Aisne	356	221
17	Durance	323	201
18	Loir	319	198
19	Oise^{a}	316	196
20	Moselle^{a}	314	195

^{a} Excluding the part of the river not on French territory.

== See also ==
- Geography of France
- List of waterways
- List of lakes of France
- List of canals in France

== Notes and references ==
- Géoportail maps service
- The Sandre database of rivers in France
