= Argenton-l'Église =

- Part of Loretz-d'Argenton
- Location of Argenton-l'Église
- Location within France Location within Nouvelle-Aquitaine
- Coordinates: 47°02′41″N 0°15′33″W
- Country: France
- Region: Nouvelle-Aquitaine
- Department: Deux-Sèvres
- Arrondissement: Bressuire
- Canton: Le Val de Thouet
- Commune: Loretz-d'Argenton
- Area^{1}: 25.86 km^{2} (9.98 sq mi)
- Elevation: 58 m (190 ft)
- Highest elevation: 82 m (269 ft)
- Lowest elevation: 35 m (115 ft)
- Population (2022): 1,587
  - Density: 61.37/km^{2} (158.9/sq mi)
- Time zone: UTC+01:00 (CET)
  - Summer (DST): UTC+02:00 (CEST)
- Postal code: 79290
- ^{1} French Land Register data, which excludes lakes, ponds, glaciers > 1 km^{2} (0.386 sq mi or 247 acres) and river estuaries.

Argenton-l'Église (French pronunciation: [aʁʒɑ̃tɔ̃ leɡliz]) is a former commune in the Deux-Sèvres department in the Nouvelle-Aquitaine region in western France. On 1 January 2019, it was merged into the new commune Loretz-d'Argenton. It is located on the river Argenton about 9 km (5.6 mi) northwest of Thouars and 36 km (22 mi) northeast of Bressuire.

Besides the village of Argenton-l'Église, the commune also included the village of Taizon, which is situated on the river Thouet some 2.5 km (1.6 mi) to the east.

== See also ==
- Communes of the Deux-Sèvres department
