= Jean Pineau =

French politician (1922–2020)

Member of the French National Assembly for Deux-Sèvres
- In office 7 May 1978 – 22 May 1981

General Councillor for the Canton of Parthenay
- In office 1979–1994

Personal details
- Born: 4 October 1922 Châtillon-sur-Thouet, France
- Died: 2 June 2020 (aged 97) Châtillon-sur-Thouet, France
- Party: UDF

Jean Paul Pierre Pineau (4 October 1922 – 2 June 2020) was a French politician.

== Biography ==
The former director of Crédit Agricole, Pineau was a municipal councillor for Châtillon-sur-Thouet from 1953 to 2001, Deputy for Deux-Sèvres from 1978 to 1981, and General Councillor for the Canton of Parthenay from 1979 to 1994, as well as mayor of Châtillon-sur-Thouet between 1983 and 2001.

Pineau was a Knight of the Legion of Honour, Knight of the Ordre des Palmes académiques, and Knight of the Order of Agricultural Merit.
