= Beuvron =

Beuvron may refer to several places in France:

- Rivers:
  - Beuvron (Loire), tributary to the Loire
  - Beuvron (Sélune), tributary to the Sélune
  - Beuvron (Yonne), tributary to the Yonne
- Communes:
  - Beuvron, Nièvre, in the Nièvre département
