= Taizon =

Coordinates: 47.053955°N 0.230649°W

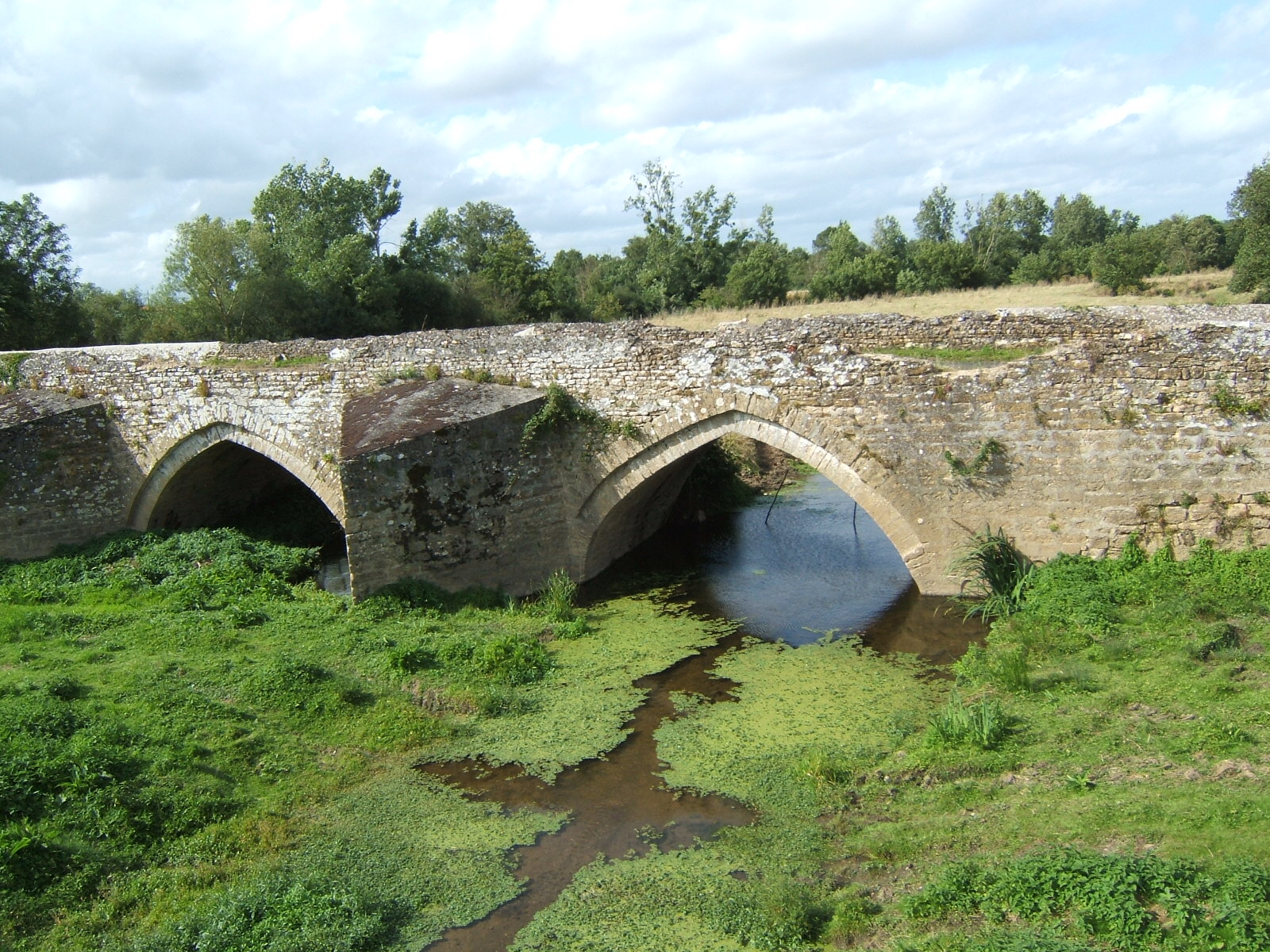
Bridge over the Thouet at Taizon

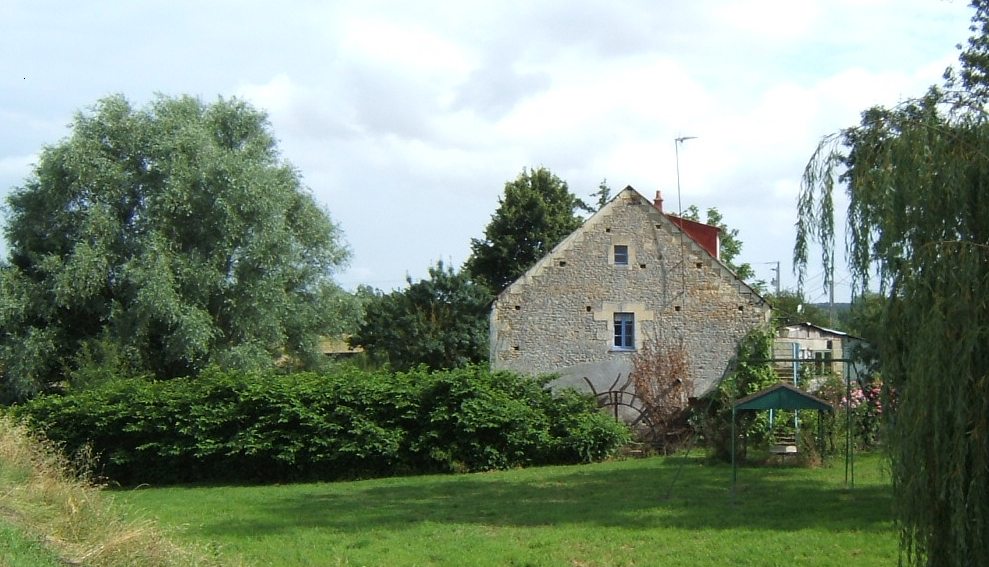
Mill at Taizon

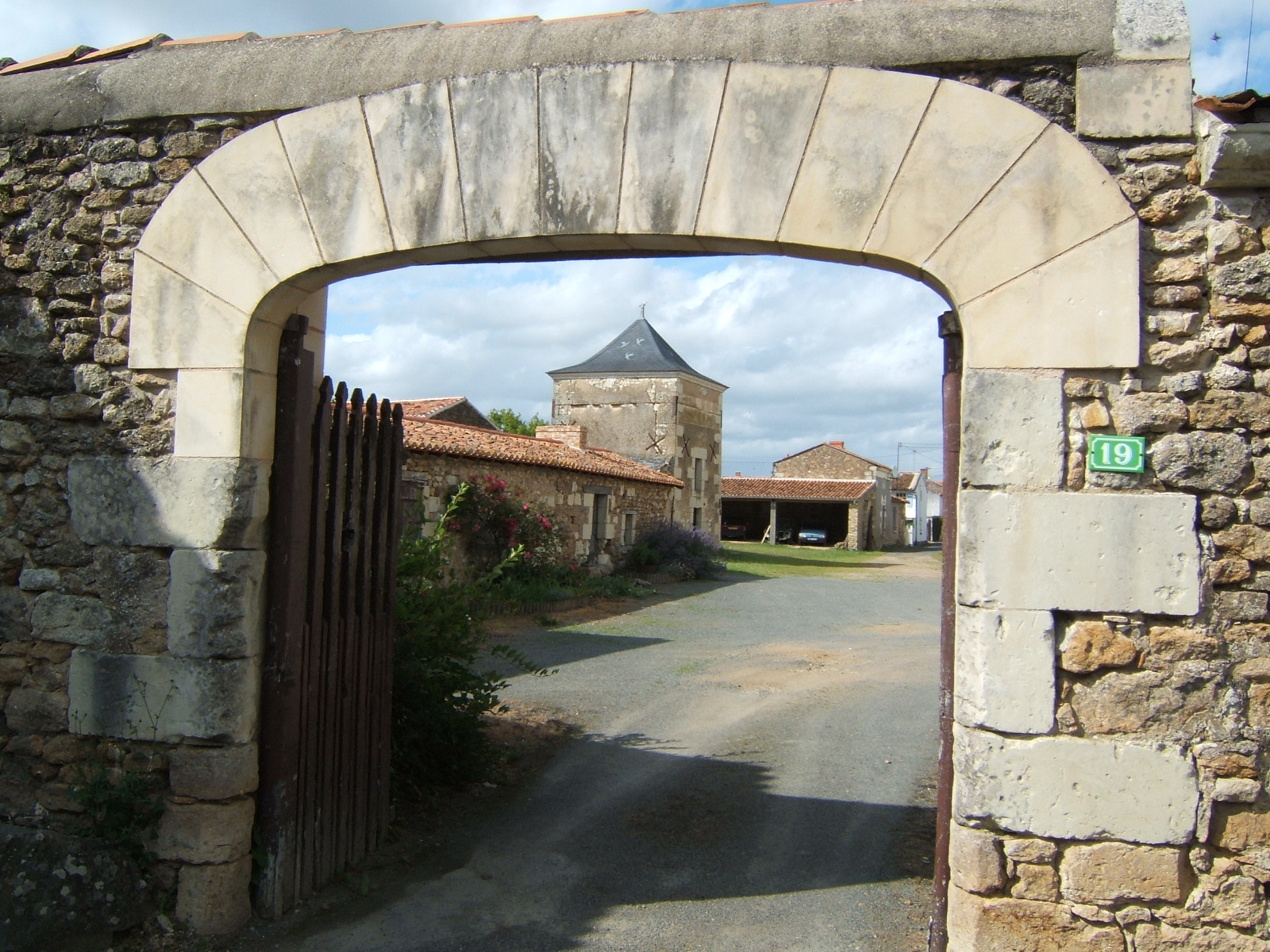
In the centre of the village

Taizon (French pronunciation: [tɛzɔ̃]) is a village in the Nouvelle-Aquitaine région of France.

== Overview ==
It is situated on the River Thouet some 9 km north of the town of Thouars. The bridge across the Thouet was built in the 13th century in a romanesque design, and was registered as a historical monument in 1943.

Taizon forms part of the commune of Loretz-d'Argenton, which lies within the département of Deux-Sèvres. The village of Argenton-l'Église lies 2.5 km to the west of Taizon.
