= Millançay =

- Commune
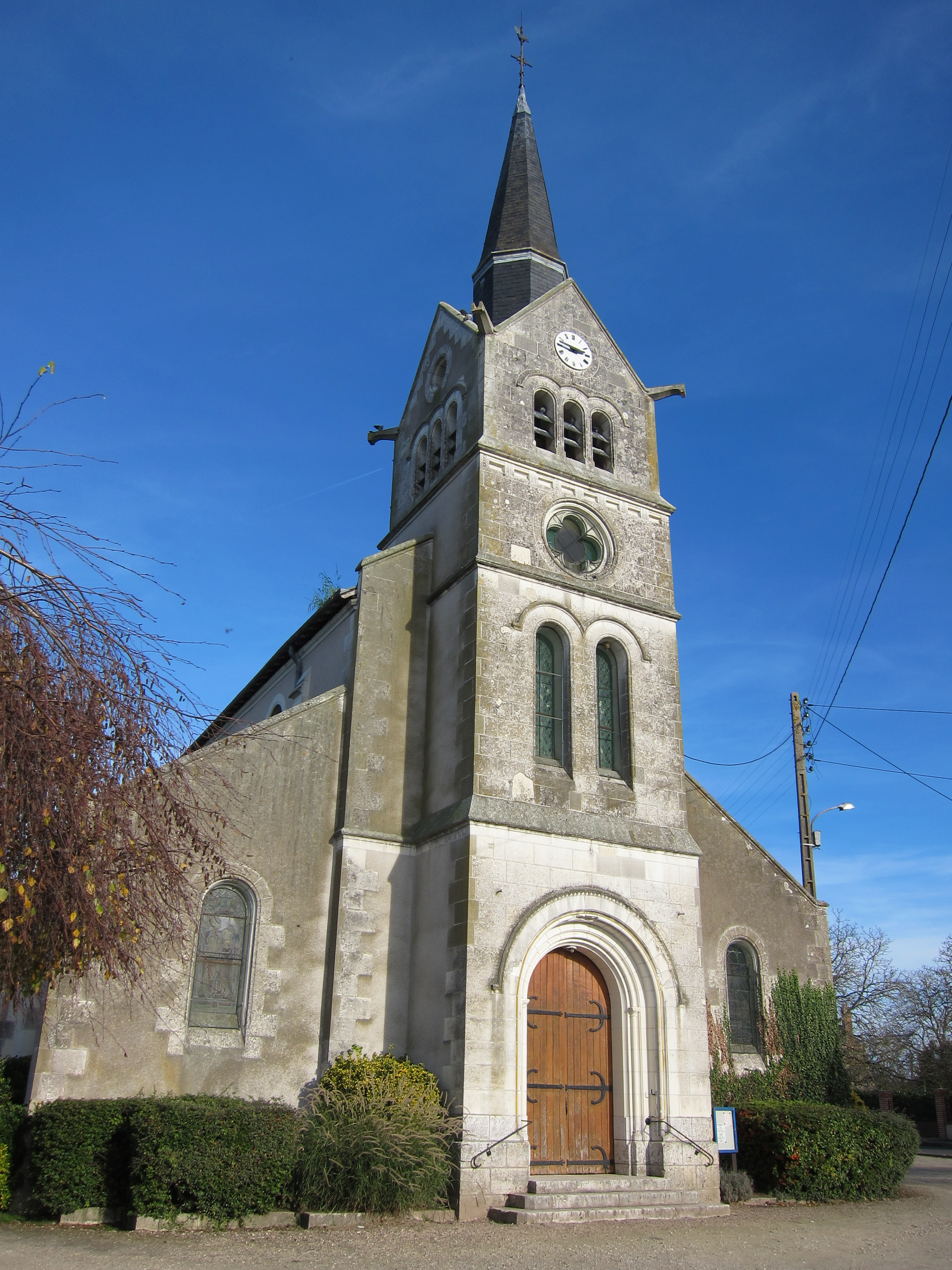
- Church of Saint-Aignan
- Location of Millançay
- Location within France Location within Centre-Val de Loire
- Coordinates: 47°26′52″N 1°46′25″E
- Country: France
- Region: Centre-Val de Loire
- Department: Loir-et-Cher
- Arrondissement: Romorantin-Lanthenay
- Canton: Romorantin-Lanthenay
- Intercommunality: La Sologne des étangs

Government
  - Mayor (2020–2026): Philippe Agulhon
- Area^{1}: 57.94 km^{2} (22.37 sq mi)
- Elevation: 103 m (338 ft)
- Highest elevation: 127 m (417 ft)
- Lowest elevation: 90 m (300 ft)
- Population (2023): 716
  - Density: 12.4/km^{2} (32.0/sq mi)
- Time zone: UTC+01:00 (CET)
  - Summer (DST): UTC+02:00 (CEST)
- INSEE/Postal code: 41140 /41200
- ^{1} French Land Register data, which excludes lakes, ponds, glaciers > 1 km^{2} (0.386 sq mi or 247 acres) and river estuaries.

Millançay (French pronunciation: [milɑ̃sɛ]) is a French commune in the Loir-et-Cher department, Centre-Val de Loire.

== Population ==
Historical population
Year	Pop.	±% p.a.
1968	743	—
1975	606	−2.87%
1982	669	+1.42%
1990	629	−0.77%
1999	667	+0.65%
2007	763	+1.70%
2012	742	−0.56%
2017	780	+1.00%
2023	716	−1.42%
Source: INSEE

== See also ==
- Communes of the Loir-et-Cher department
