= Canton of Romorantin-Lanthenay =

Coordinates: 47.36°N 1.74°E

The canton of Romorantin-Lanthenay is an administrative division of the Loir-et-Cher department, central France. It was created at the French canton reorganisation which came into effect in March 2015. Its seat is in Romorantin-Lanthenay.

It consists of the following communes:

1. Loreux
2. Millançay
3. Romorantin-Lanthenay
4. Veilleins
5. Vernou-en-Sologne
6. Villeherviers
