= Bouillé-Loretz =

- Part of Loretz-d'Argenton
- Location of Bouillé-Loretz
- Location within France Location within Nouvelle-Aquitaine
- Coordinates: 47°04′47″N 0°16′17″W
- Country: France
- Region: Nouvelle-Aquitaine
- Department: Deux-Sèvres
- Arrondissement: Bressuire
- Canton: Le Val de Thouet
- Commune: Loretz-d'Argenton
- Area^{1}: 26.78 km^{2} (10.34 sq mi)
- Elevation: 52 m (171 ft)
- Highest elevation: 86 m (282 ft)
- Lowest elevation: 35 m (115 ft)
- Population (2022): 1,003
  - Density: 37.45/km^{2} (97.00/sq mi)
- Time zone: UTC+01:00 (CET)
  - Summer (DST): UTC+02:00 (CEST)
- Postal code: 79290
- Website: www.bouille-loretz.notremairie.fr
- ^{1} French Land Register data, which excludes lakes, ponds, glaciers > 1 km^{2} (0.386 sq mi or 247 acres) and river estuaries.

Bouillé-Loretz (French pronunciation: [buje lɔʁɛ]) is a former commune in the Deux-Sèvres department in the Nouvelle-Aquitaine region in western France. On 1 January 2019, it was merged into the new commune Loretz-d'Argenton.

== See also ==
- Communes of the Deux-Sèvres department
