= Veilleins =

- Commune
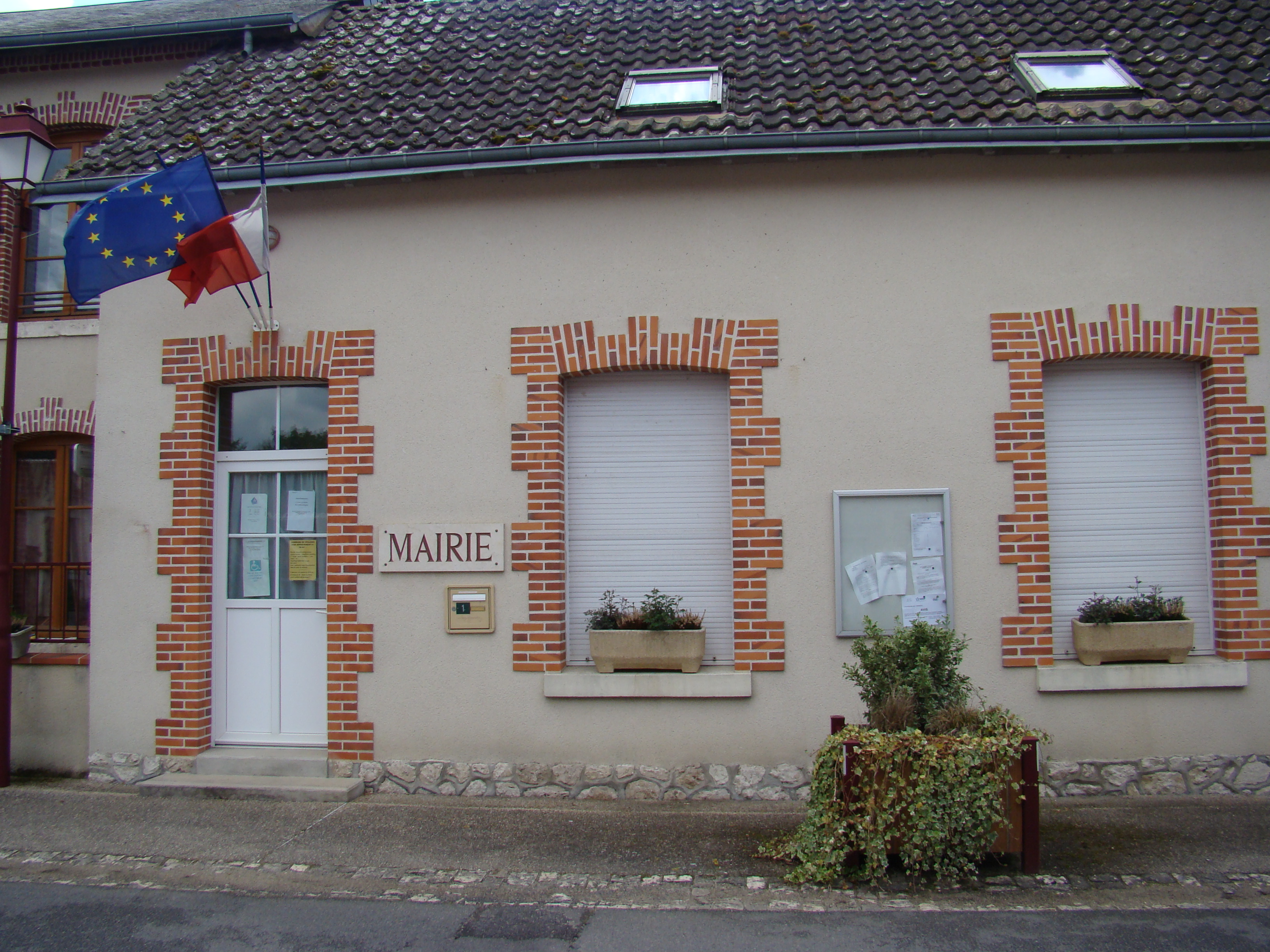
- Town hall
- Location of Veilleins
- Location within France Location within Centre-Val de Loire
- Coordinates: 47°25′18″N 1°40′16″E
- Country: France
- Region: Centre-Val de Loire
- Department: Loir-et-Cher
- Arrondissement: Romorantin-Lanthenay
- Canton: Romorantin-Lanthenay
- Intercommunality: Sologne des étangs

Government
  - Mayor (2020–2026): François d'Espinay-Saint-Luc
- Area^{1}: 43.26 km^{2} (16.70 sq mi)
- Elevation: 109 m (358 ft)
- Highest elevation: 127 m (417 ft)
- Lowest elevation: 93 m (305 ft)
- Population (2023): 145
  - Density: 3.35/km^{2} (8.68/sq mi)
- Time zone: UTC+01:00 (CET)
  - Summer (DST): UTC+02:00 (CEST)
- INSEE/Postal code: 41268 /41230
- ^{1} French Land Register data, which excludes lakes, ponds, glaciers > 1 km^{2} (0.386 sq mi or 247 acres) and river estuaries.

Veilleins is a commune of the Loir-et-Cher department in central France.

== Population ==
Historical population
Year	Pop.	±% p.a.
1968	273	—
1975	227	−2.60%
1982	185	−2.88%
1990	190	+0.33%
1999	180	−0.60%
2007	141	−3.01%
2012	155	+1.91%
2017	161	+0.76%
2023	145	−1.73%
Source: INSEE

== See also ==
- Communes of the Loir-et-Cher department
