= Château d'Angles-sur-l'Anglin =

Ruined castle in Angles-sur-l'Anglin in the Vienne département of France

Coordinates: 46°41′38″N 0°52′59″E

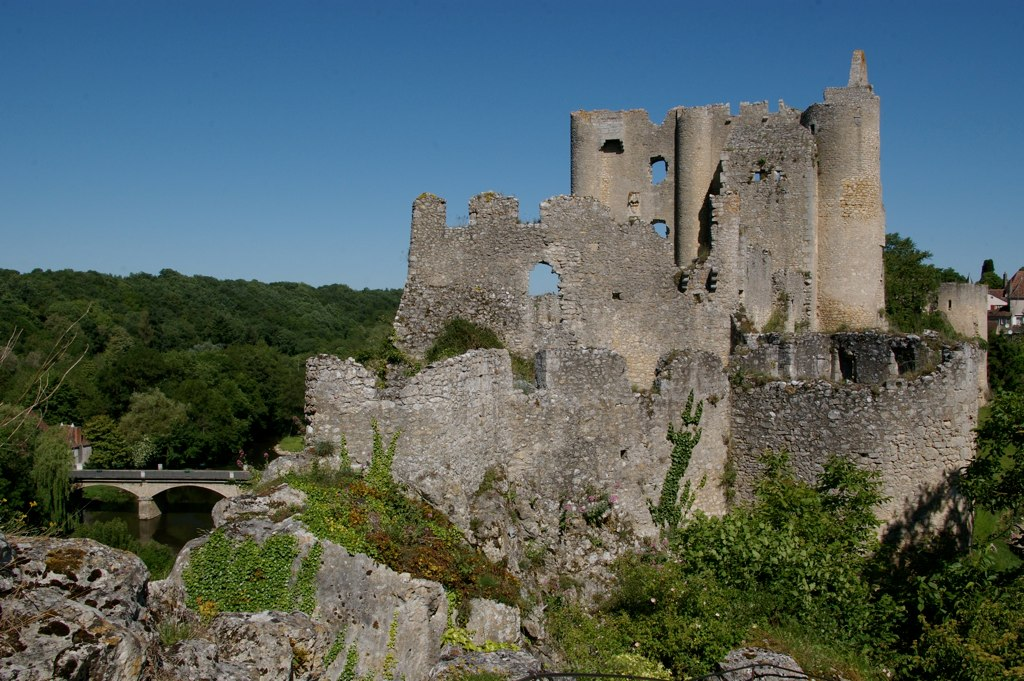

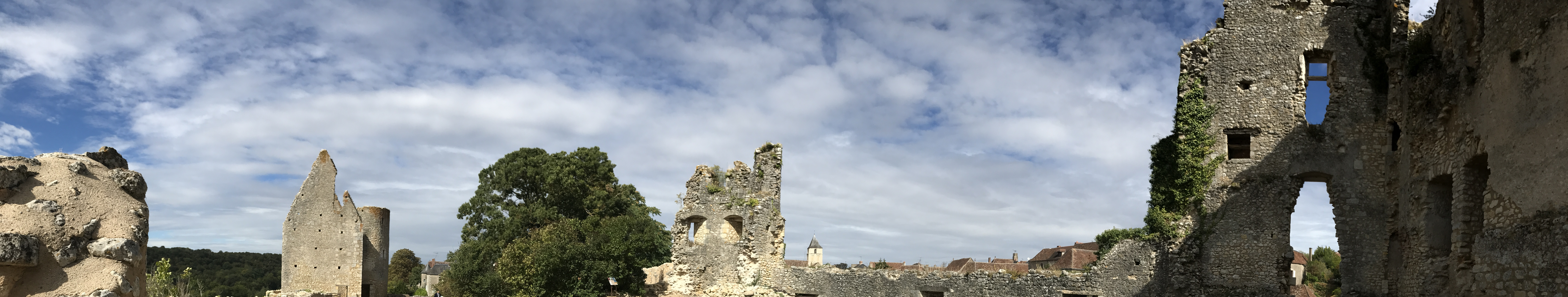
Inner court yard and ruins of what was last a prison on the right

The Château d'Angles-sur-l'Anglin is a ruined castle in the commune of Angles-sur-l'Anglin in the Vienne département of France. It dates originally from the 12th century, with significant alterations and additions in the 15th century.

The ruin is open to the public during normal hours at a cost of 6 euros. A self guided tour provides several informative kiosks along the way in both French and English.

A motte was here before the present castle. The earliest records date from 1025. The keep and vault were constructed in the 12th century. In the 15th century, the keep was altered for bishop Hugues de Combarel who also built the new castle. Guillaume de Charpagne, his successor, continued the work.

It has been listed since 1926 as a monument historique by the French Ministry of Culture.

== See also ==
- List of castles in France
