= Azay-sur-Thouet =

- Commune
- Location of Azay-sur-Thouet
- Location within France Location within Nouvelle-Aquitaine
- Coordinates: 46°37′25″N 0°21′04″W
- Country: France
- Region: Nouvelle-Aquitaine
- Department: Deux-Sèvres
- Arrondissement: Parthenay
- Canton: La Gâtine
- Intercommunality: CC Parthenay-Gâtine

Government
  - Mayor (2020–2026): Jean-Michel Renault
- Area^{1}: 20 km^{2} (7.7 sq mi)
- Population (2023): 1,114
  - Density: 56/km^{2} (140/sq mi)
- Time zone: UTC+01:00 (CET)
  - Summer (DST): UTC+02:00 (CEST)
- INSEE/Postal code: 79025 /
- ^{1} French Land Register data, which excludes lakes, ponds, glaciers > 1 km^{2} (0.386 sq mi or 247 acres) and river estuaries.

Azay-sur-Thouet (French pronunciation: [azɛ syʁ twɛ], literally Azay on Thouet) is a commune in the Deux-Sèvres department in the Nouvelle-Aquitaine region in western France. It is situated on the river Thouet some 6 km (3.7 mi) east of Secondigny and 9 km west of the town of Parthenay.

== See also ==
- Communes of the Deux-Sèvres department
