= Loreux =

- Commune
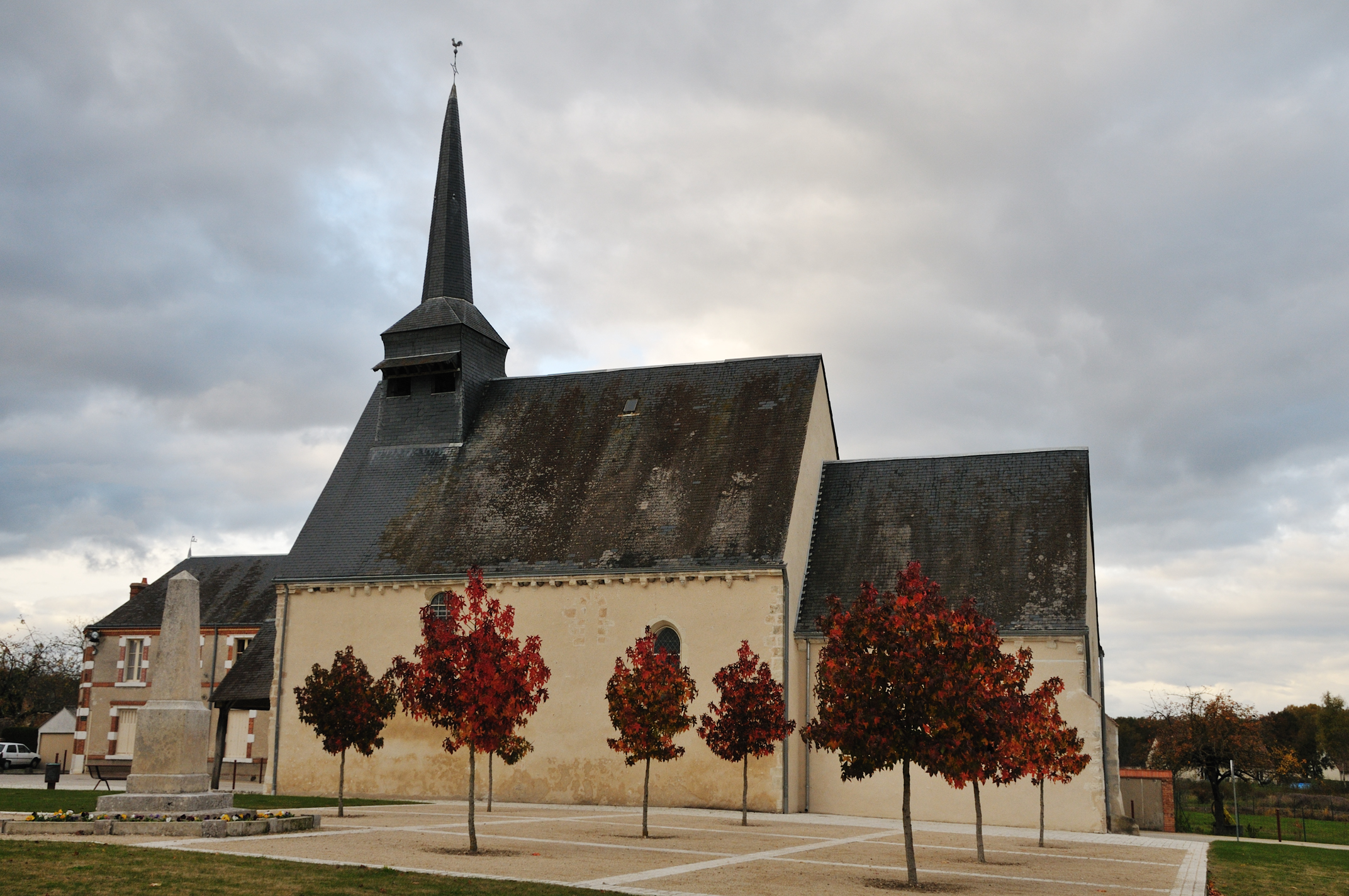
- Church of Saint-Laurian
- Location of Loreux
- Location within France Location within Centre-Val de Loire
- Coordinates: 47°23′59″N 1°49′54″E
- Country: France
- Region: Centre-Val de Loire
- Department: Loir-et-Cher
- Arrondissement: Romorantin-Lanthenay
- Canton: Romorantin-Lanthenay
- Intercommunality: Romorantinais et Monestois

Government
  - Mayor (2020–2026): Joël Herisset
- Area^{1}: 29.95 km^{2} (11.56 sq mi)
- Highest elevation: 124 m (407 ft)
- Lowest elevation: 88 m (289 ft)
- Population (2023): 238
  - Density: 7.95/km^{2} (20.6/sq mi)
- Time zone: UTC+01:00 (CET)
  - Summer (DST): UTC+02:00 (CEST)
- INSEE/Postal code: 41118 /41200
- ^{1} French Land Register data, which excludes lakes, ponds, glaciers > 1 km^{2} (0.386 sq mi or 247 acres) and river estuaries.

Loreux (French pronunciation: [lɔʁø]) is a commune in the Loir-et-Cher department of central France.

== Population ==
Historical population
Year	Pop.	±% p.a.
1968	285	—
1975	247	−2.02%
1982	260	+0.74%
1990	265	+0.24%
1999	255	−0.43%
2007	247	−0.40%
2012	230	−1.42%
2017	209	−1.90%
2023	238	+2.19%
Source: INSEE

== See also ==
- Communes of the Loir-et-Cher department
