= Gourgé =

- Commune
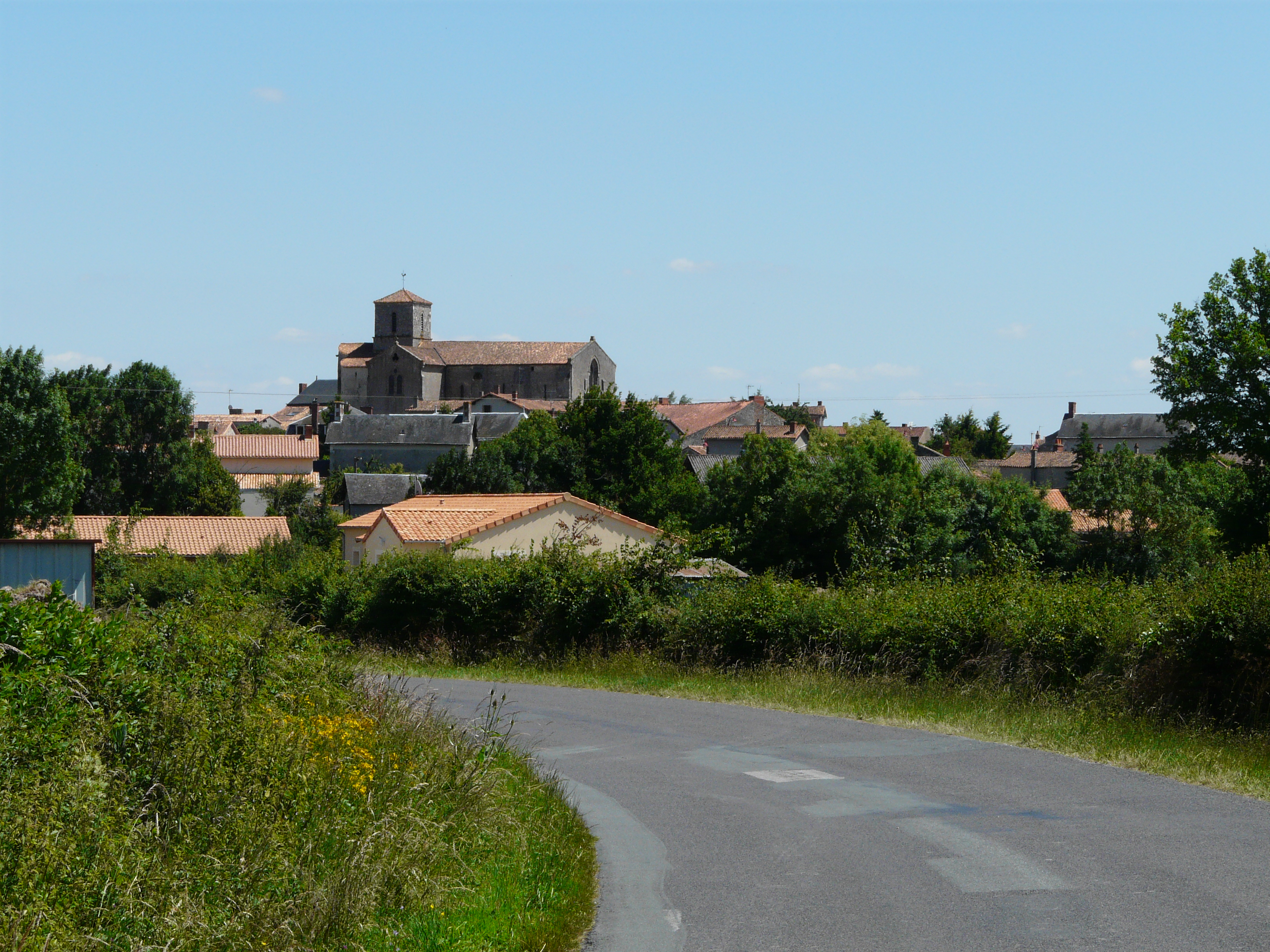
- A general view of Gourgé

- Coat of arms
- Location of Gourgé
- Location within France Location within Nouvelle-Aquitaine
- Coordinates: 46°43′45″N 0°09′52″W
- Country: France
- Region: Nouvelle-Aquitaine
- Department: Deux-Sèvres
- Arrondissement: Parthenay
- Canton: La Gâtine
- Intercommunality: CC Parthenay-Gâtine

Government
  - Mayor (2020–2026): David Feufeu
- Area^{1}: 50.43 km^{2} (19.47 sq mi)
- Elevation: 122 m (400 ft)
- Highest elevation: 164 m (538 ft)
- Lowest elevation: 84 m (276 ft)
- Population (2023): 884
  - Density: 17.5/km^{2} (45.4/sq mi)
- Time zone: UTC+01:00 (CET)
  - Summer (DST): UTC+02:00 (CEST)
- INSEE/Postal code: 79135 /79200
- ^{1} French Land Register data, which excludes lakes, ponds, glaciers > 1 km^{2} (0.386 sq mi or 247 acres) and river estuaries.

Gourgé (French pronunciation: [ɡuʁʒe]) is a commune in the Deux-Sèvres department in the Nouvelle-Aquitaine region in western France. It is located at a 10 km (6.2 mi) distance from Parthenay.

== Description ==
The municipality, extending to 50.4 km^{2}, had 918 inhabitants at the last census in 2006. With a density of 18.2 inhabitants per square km, Gourgé has experienced a rise of 0.1% in its population since 1999. Surrounded by the communes of Lhoumois, Lageon and Aubigny, Gourgé is located 27 km to the south-east of Bressuire, the largest city of the area. The village is at an altitude of 127 meters. The Thouet and Cebron rivers are the main water courses in the village.

Gourgé's inhabitants are called Gourgéens and Gourgéennes. The village's mayor is Gilles Hamel.

The village is located on one of the pilgrimage routes to Santiago de Compostela. It is also a starting point for a number of cycle and walking routes along the Thouet valley. The commune is some 40 km away from to the Loire-Anjou-Touraine regional natural park.

=== Monuments ===
Gourgé has a ninth-century church and an old Roman bridge over the River Thouet.

=== Events ===
The village hosts a medieval fair.

== See also ==
- Thouet river
- Communes of the Deux-Sèvres department
