= Vernou-en-Sologne =

- Commune
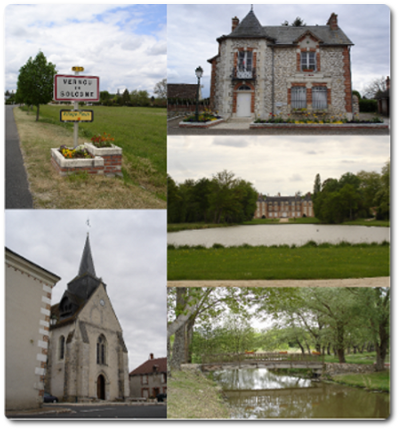
- Clockwise from top left: Road sign, the town hall and post office, the chateau, footbridge, the church
- Location of Vernou-en-Sologne
- Location within France Location within Centre-Val de Loire
- Coordinates: 47°30′07″N 1°40′51″E
- Country: France
- Region: Centre-Val de Loire
- Department: Loir-et-Cher
- Arrondissement: Romorantin-Lanthenay
- Canton: Romorantin-Lanthenay
- Intercommunality: Sologne des étangs

Government
  - Mayor (2020–2026): Nicolas Deguine
- Area^{1}: 51.31 km^{2} (19.81 sq mi)
- Elevation: 95 m (312 ft)
- Highest elevation: 116 m (381 ft)
- Lowest elevation: 82 m (269 ft)
- Population (2023): 550
  - Density: 11/km^{2} (28/sq mi)
- Time zone: UTC+01:00 (CET)
  - Summer (DST): UTC+02:00 (CEST)
- INSEE/Postal code: 41271 /41230
- ^{1} French Land Register data, which excludes lakes, ponds, glaciers > 1 km^{2} (0.386 sq mi or 247 acres) and river estuaries.

Vernou-en-Sologne (French pronunciation: [vɛʁnu ɑ̃ sɔlɔɲ], literally Vernou in Sologne) is a commune in the Loir-et-Cher department in central France.

== Population ==
Historical population
Year	Pop.	±% p.a.
1968	621	—
1975	528	−2.29%
1982	502	−0.72%
1990	543	+0.99%
1999	524	−0.39%
2007	584	+1.36%
2012	611	+0.91%
2017	624	+0.42%
2023	550	−2.08%
Source: INSEE

== See also ==
- Communes of the Loir-et-Cher department
