= Loretz-d'Argenton =

- Commune
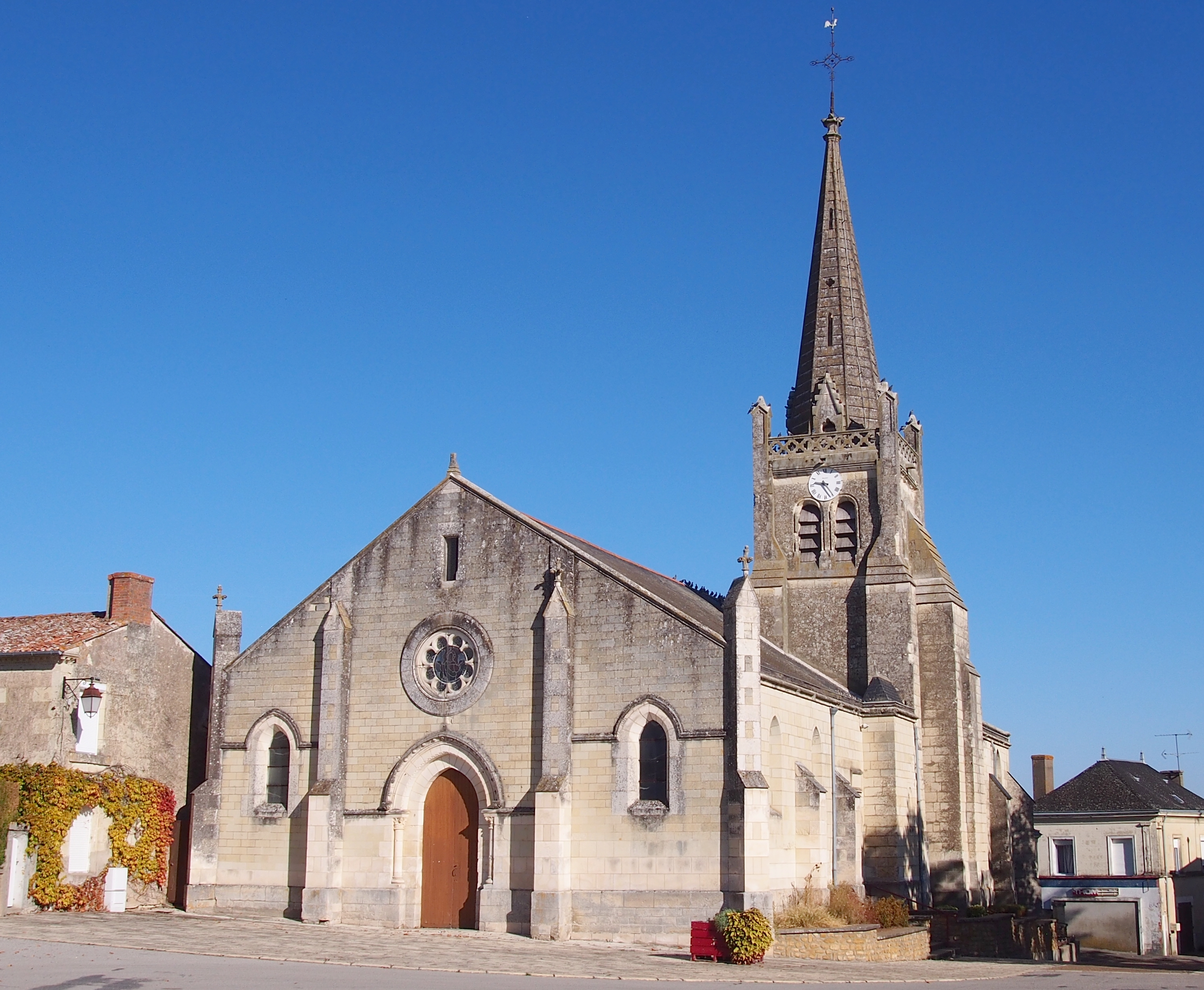
- Location of Loretz-d'Argenton
- Location within France Location within Nouvelle-Aquitaine
- Coordinates: 47°02′41″N 0°15′33″W
- Country: France
- Region: Nouvelle-Aquitaine
- Department: Deux-Sèvres
- Arrondissement: Bressuire
- Canton: Le Val de Thouet
- Intercommunality: CC Thouarsais

Government
  - Mayor (2020–2026): Pierre Sauvetre
- Area^{1}: 52.64 km^{2} (20.32 sq mi)
- Highest elevation: 86 m (282 ft)
- Lowest elevation: 35 m (115 ft)
- Population (2023): 2,575
  - Density: 48.92/km^{2} (126.7/sq mi)
- Time zone: UTC+01:00 (CET)
  - Summer (DST): UTC+02:00 (CEST)
- INSEE/Postal code: 79014 /79290
- ^{1} French Land Register data, which excludes lakes, ponds, glaciers > 1 km^{2} (0.386 sq mi or 247 acres) and river estuaries.

Loretz-d'Argenton (French pronunciation: [lɔʁɛ daʁʒɑ̃tɔ̃]) is a commune in the Deux-Sèvres department in the Nouvelle-Aquitaine region in western France. It was established on 1 January 2019 by merger of the former communes of Argenton-l'Église (the seat) and Bouillé-Loretz.

== Population ==
Population data refer to the area corresponding with the commune as of January 2025.

Historical population
Year	Pop.	±% p.a.
1968	2,926	—
1975	2,773	−0.76%
1982	2,748	−0.13%
1990	2,621	−0.59%
1999	2,539	−0.35%
2007	2,638	+0.48%
2012	2,689	+0.38%
2017	2,655	−0.25%
2023	2,575	−0.51%
Source: INSEE

== See also ==
- Communes of the Deux-Sèvres department
