= Châtillon-sur-Thouet =

- Commune
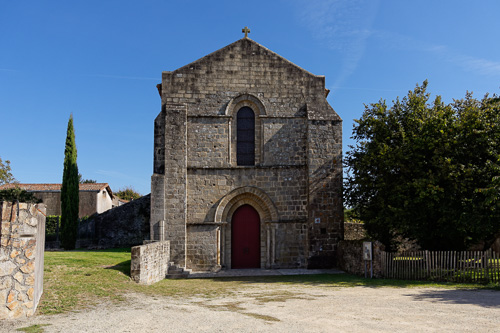
- The church in Châtillon-sur-Thouet
- Location of Châtillon-sur-Thouet
- Location within France Location within Nouvelle-Aquitaine
- Coordinates: 46°39′43″N 0°14′23″W
- Country: France
- Region: Nouvelle-Aquitaine
- Department: Deux-Sèvres
- Arrondissement: Parthenay
- Canton: Parthenay
- Intercommunality: CC Parthenay-Gâtine

Government
  - Mayor (2022–2026): Marie-Noëlle Beau
- Area^{1}: 16 km^{2} (6.2 sq mi)
- Population (2023): 2,656
  - Density: 170/km^{2} (430/sq mi)
- Time zone: UTC+01:00 (CET)
  - Summer (DST): UTC+02:00 (CEST)
- INSEE/Postal code: 79080 /
- ^{1} French Land Register data, which excludes lakes, ponds, glaciers > 1 km^{2} (0.386 sq mi or 247 acres) and river estuaries.

Châtillon-sur-Thouet (French pronunciation: [ʃatijɔ̃ syʁ twɛ], literally Châtillon on Thouet) is a village and commune in the Deux-Sèvres department of the Nouvelle-Aquitaine region in western France. The village is situated on the river Thouet to the north of the town of Parthenay, with which it forms a contiguous built-up area.

The commune of Châtillon-sur-Thouet has joined together with 37 neighbouring communes to establish the Communauté de communes de Parthenay-Gâtine which provides a framework within which local tasks are carried out together.

== Population ==
Historical population
| Year | Pop. | ±% p.a. |
|---|---|---|
| 1968 | 1,306 | — |
| 1975 | 2,323 | +8.57% |
| 1982 | 2,874 | +3.09% |
| 1990 | 2,769 | −0.46% |
| 1999 | 2,727 | −0.17% |
| 2007 | 2,848 | +0.54% |
| 2012 | 2,764 | −0.60% |
| 2017 | 2,685 | −0.58% |
| 2023 | 2,656 | −0.18% |
Source: INSEE

== See also ==
- Communes of the Deux-Sèvres department
