= Saint-Loup-Lamairé =

- Commune
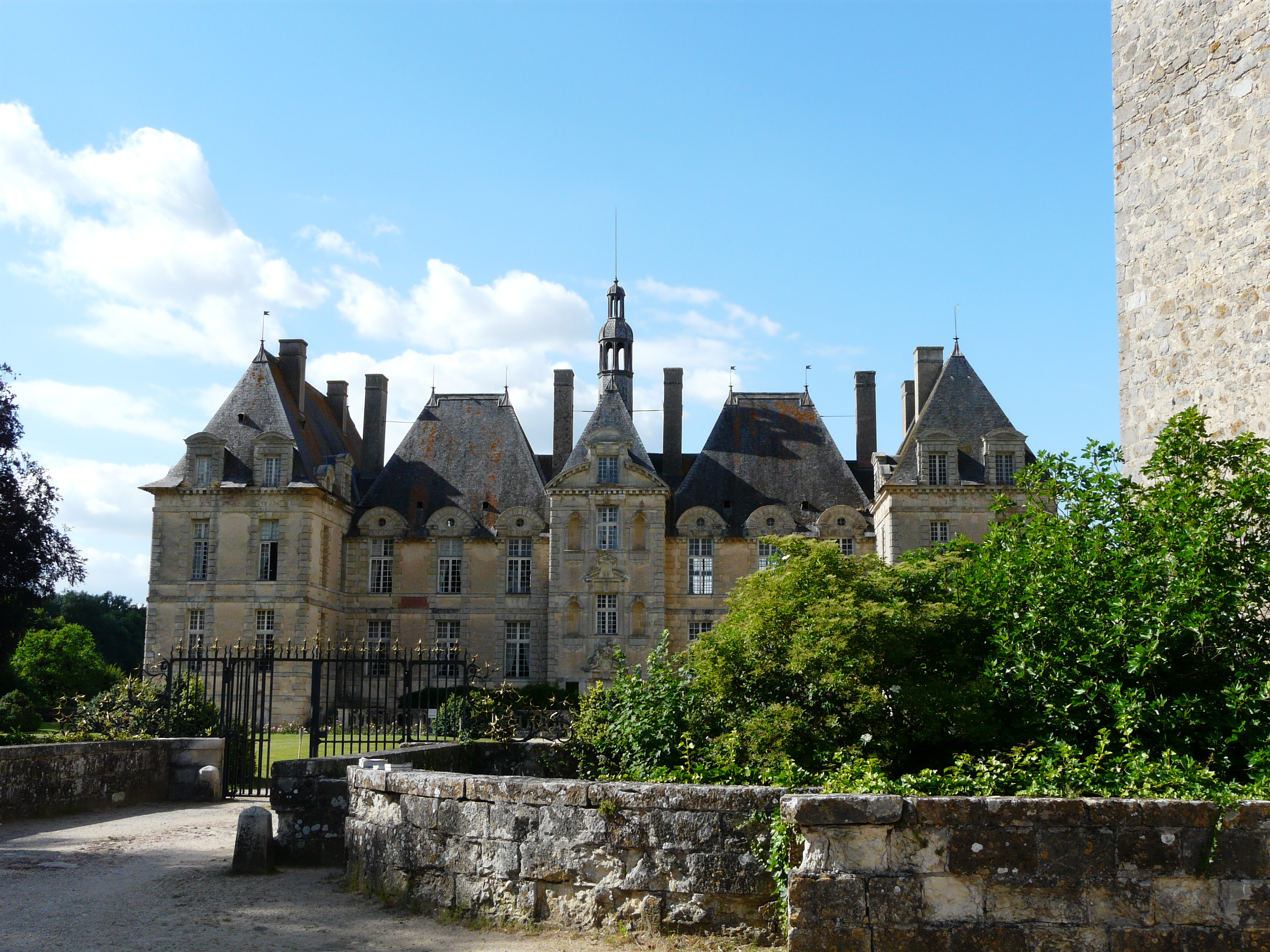
- The Château of Saint-Loup-sur-Thouet

- Coat of arms
- Location of Saint-Loup-Lamairé
- Location within France Location within Nouvelle-Aquitaine
- Coordinates: 46°47′21″N 0°09′50″W
- Country: France
- Region: Nouvelle-Aquitaine
- Department: Deux-Sèvres
- Arrondissement: Parthenay
- Canton: Le Val de Thouet

Government
  - Mayor (2020–2026): Pascal Bironneau
- Area^{1}: 21.80 km^{2} (8.42 sq mi)
- Elevation: 130 m (430 ft)
- Highest elevation: 162 m (531 ft)
- Lowest elevation: 74 m (243 ft)
- Population (2023): 1,064
  - Density: 48.81/km^{2} (126.4/sq mi)
- Time zone: UTC+01:00 (CET)
  - Summer (DST): UTC+02:00 (CEST)
- INSEE/Postal code: 79268 /79600
- ^{1} French Land Register data, which excludes lakes, ponds, glaciers > 1 km^{2} (0.386 sq mi or 247 acres) and river estuaries.

Saint-Loup-Lamairé (French pronunciation: [sɛ̃ lu lamɛʁe]) is a commune in the Deux-Sèvres department in western France.

The commune was formed in 1974 by the merger of two former communes: Saint-Loup-sur-Thouet and Lamairé.

As indicated by its name, the village of Saint-Loup-sur-Thouet is situated on the River Thouet. The long-distance walking route GR 36 also passes through, en route from Ouistreham, on the coast of the English Channel, to Bourg-Madame, on the border with Spain.

== See also ==
- Théophane Vénard, born in Saint-Loup-sur-Thouet
- Communes of the Deux-Sèvres department
