= Angles-sur-l'Anglin =

- Commune
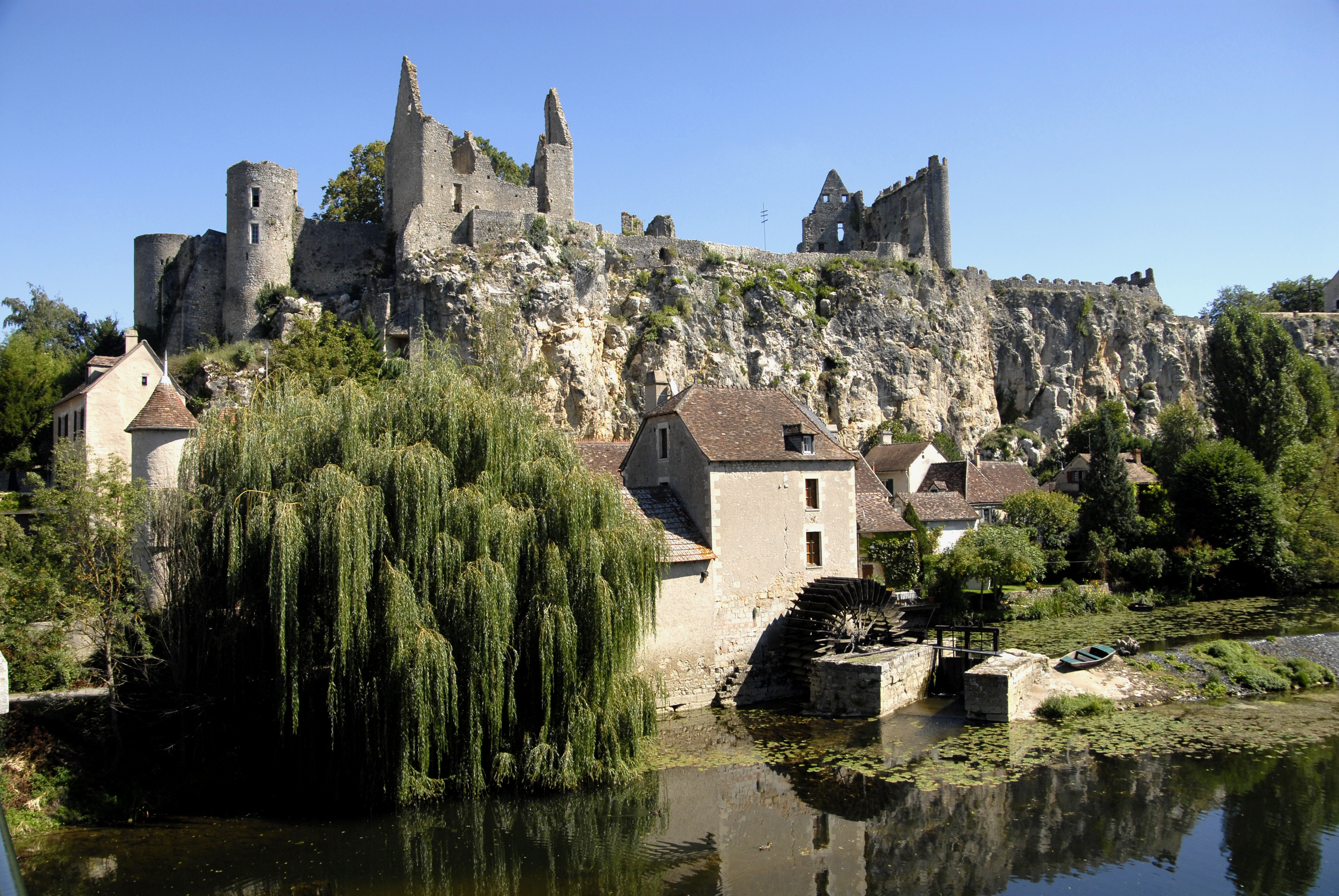
- Castle ruins

- Coat of arms
- Location of Angles-sur-l'Anglin
- Location within France Location within Nouvelle-Aquitaine
- Coordinates: 46°41′46″N 0°53′08″E
- Country: France
- Region: Nouvelle-Aquitaine
- Department: Vienne
- Arrondissement: Montmorillon
- Canton: Montmorillon
- Intercommunality: CA Grand Châtellerault

Government
  - Mayor (2024–2026): Jean-Marie Petit-Clair
- Area^{1}: 14.75 km^{2} (5.70 sq mi)
- Elevation: 93 m (305 ft)
- Highest elevation: 139 m (456 ft)
- Lowest elevation: 63 m (207 ft)
- Population (2023): 370
  - Density: 25/km^{2} (65/sq mi)
- Time zone: UTC+01:00 (CET)
  - Summer (DST): UTC+02:00 (CEST)
- INSEE/Postal code: 86004 /86260
- ^{1} French Land Register data, which excludes lakes, ponds, glaciers > 1 km^{2} (0.386 sq mi or 247 acres) and river estuaries.

Angles-sur-l'Anglin (French pronunciation: [ɑ̃ɡl syʁ lɑ̃ɡlɛ̃], literally Angles on the Anglin) is a commune in the Vienne department in the Nouvelle-Aquitaine region in western France. It is a member of Les Plus Beaux Villages de France (The Most Beautiful Villages of France) Association.

The Château d'Angles-sur-l'Anglin is a ruined castle dating back to the 11th century, originally constructed for the Bishop of Poitiers.

== Geography ==
The river Anglin flows into the Gartempe in the commune.

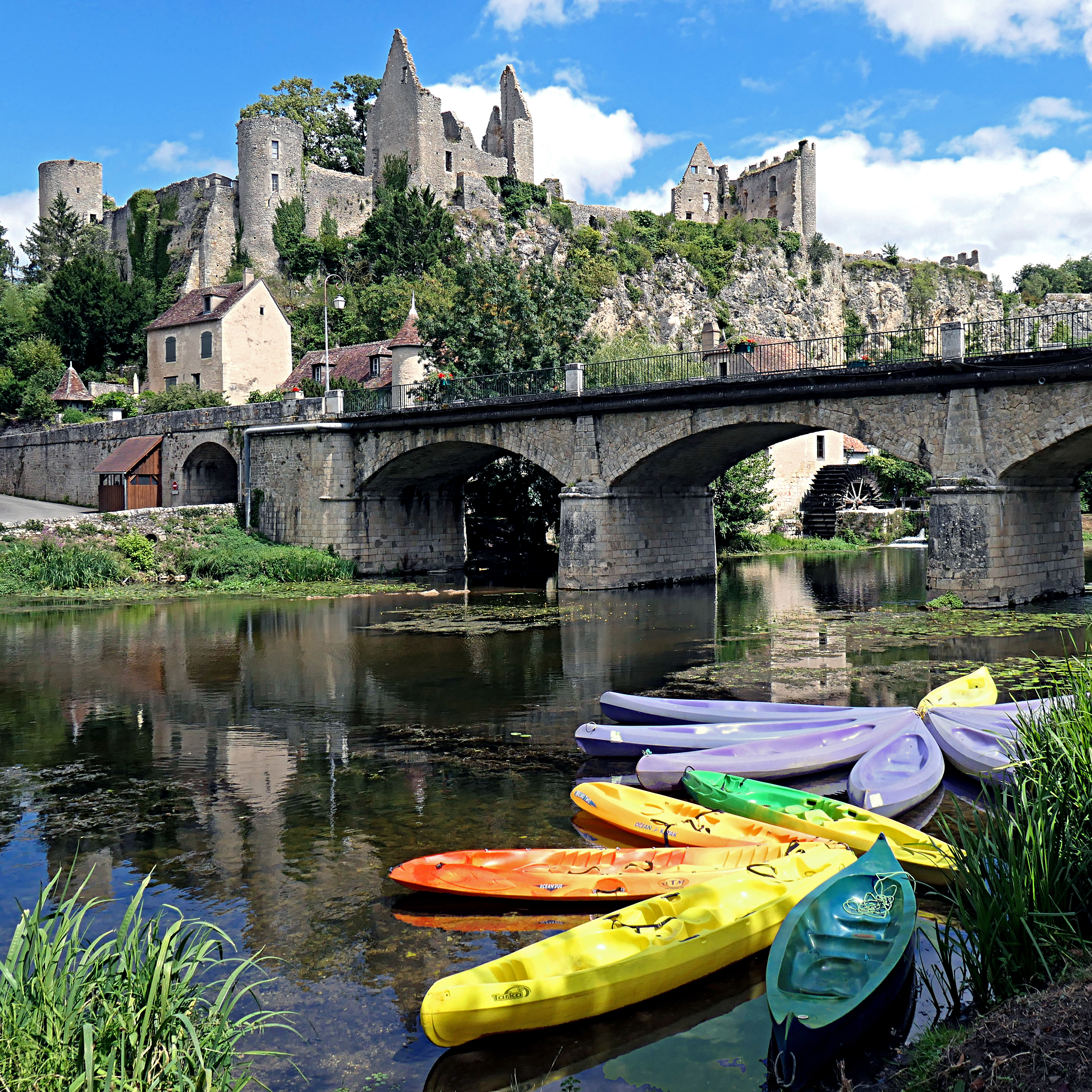
Angles-sur-l'Anglin, Vienne, France - Flickr - pom'.

== See also ==
- Roc-aux-Sorciers
- Communes of the Vienne department
