= Dive (river) =

River in France

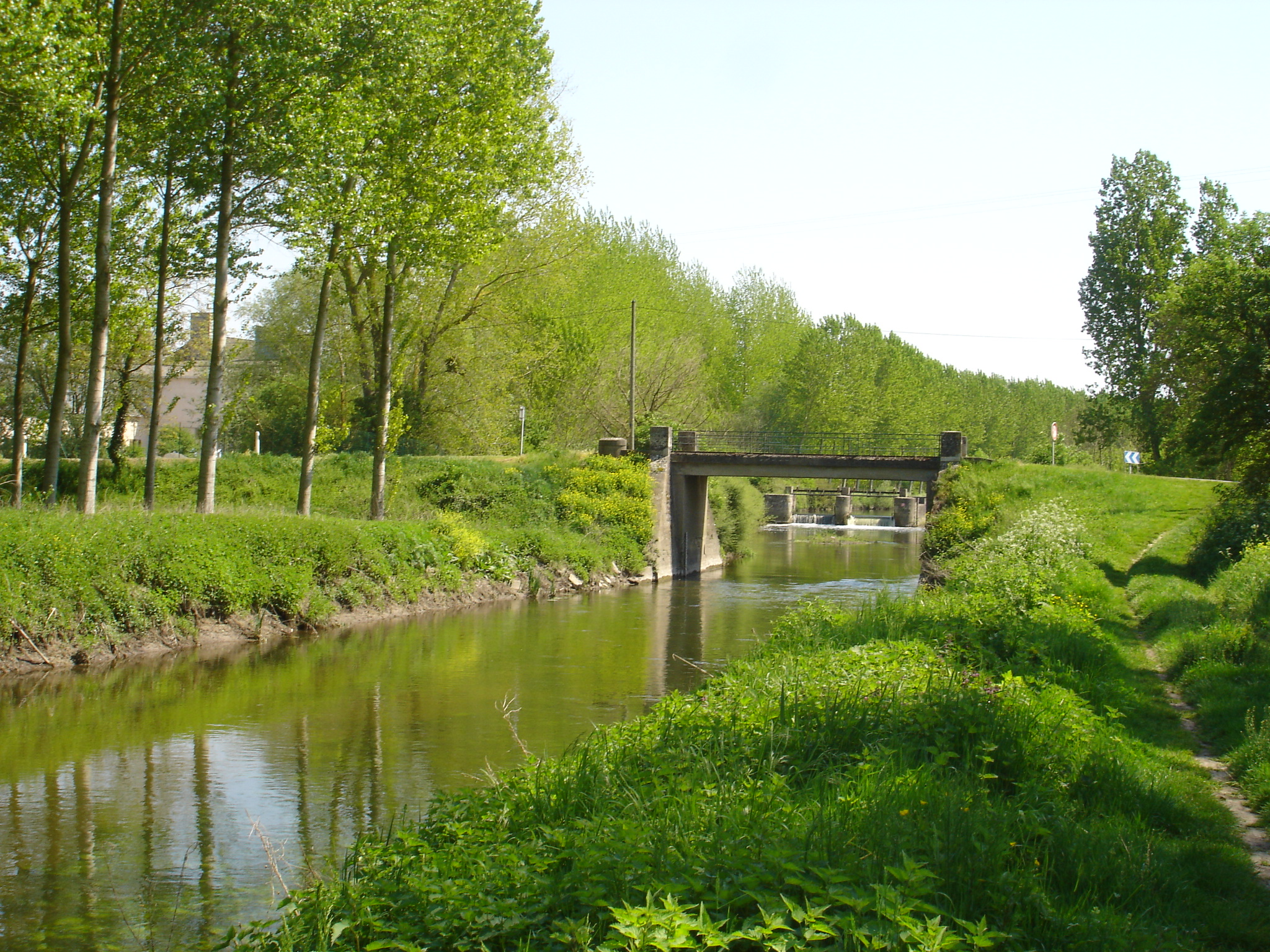
- The Dive near Brézé. Successive bridges and simple barrage are seen in the distance.

- Location within France Location within Nouvelle-Aquitaine

Location
- Country: France

Physical characteristics
- Mouth
  - location: Thouet
  - coordinates: 47°11′17″N 0°4′58″E
- Length: 73.7 km (45.8 mi)

Basin features
- Progression: Thouet→ Loire→ Atlantic Ocean

The Dive (French pronunciation: [div]) is a 73.7 km (45.8 mi) river in the Nouvelle-Aquitaine and Pays de la Loire regions in western France. It is a right-bank tributary of the Thouet. Its source is in the commune of Maisonneuve, Vienne. It later bisects the department of Deux-Sèvres to reach Maine-et-Loire. It flows generally northwards and through the towns of Moncontour and Brézé, finally flowing into the Thouet in Saint-Just-sur-Dive.

In common with most rivers in this region of France flows are quite widely controlled by creation of heads of water, through embankment and barrages, which prevents near loss of upper reaches in summer. For winter sluices are opened, which prevents flooding, which historically would affect a small proportion of the land as the river gradient is relatively high and the valley modest but noticeable along most banks.
