= Candé-sur-Beuvron =

- Commune
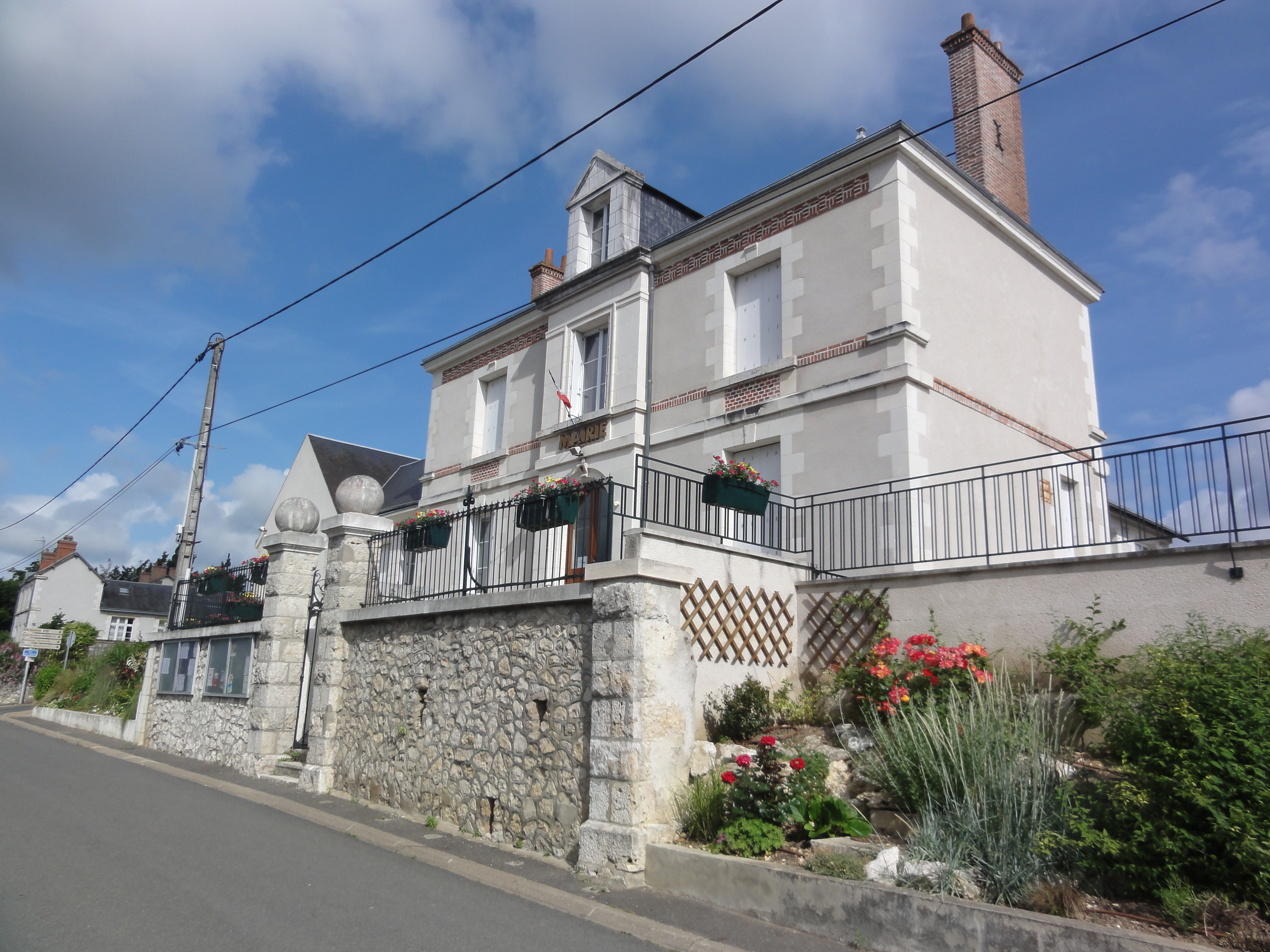
- Town hall
- Location of Candé-sur-Beuvron
- Location within France Location within Centre-Val de Loire
- Coordinates: 47°29′45″N 1°15′40″E
- Country: France
- Region: Centre-Val de Loire
- Department: Loir-et-Cher
- Arrondissement: Blois
- Canton: Blois-3
- Intercommunality: CA Blois Agglopolys

Government
  - Mayor (2020–2026): Stéphane Ledoux
- Area^{1}: 15.49 km^{2} (5.98 sq mi)
- Elevation: 68 m (223 ft)
- Highest elevation: 111 m (364 ft)
- Lowest elevation: 62 m (203 ft)
- Population (2023): 1,463
  - Density: 94.45/km^{2} (244.6/sq mi)
- Time zone: UTC+01:00 (CET)
  - Summer (DST): UTC+02:00 (CEST)
- INSEE/Postal code: 41029 /41120
- ^{1} French Land Register data, which excludes lakes, ponds, glaciers > 1 km^{2} (0.386 sq mi or 247 acres) and river estuaries.

Candé-sur-Beuvron (French pronunciation: [kɑ̃de syʁ bøvʁɔ̃], literally Candé on Beuvron) is a commune in the Loir-et-Cher department in central France.

== Geography ==
The Cosson river flows southwest through the middle of the commune, then flows into the Beuvron, which flows west through the southern part of the commune before flowing into the Loire, which forms the commune's western border.

The village lies between the Cosson and the Beuvron.

== Population ==
Historical population
Year	Pop.	±% p.a.
1968	508	—
1975	540	+0.88%
1982	916	+7.84%
1990	1,134	+2.70%
1999	1,208	+0.70%
2007	1,437	+2.19%
2012	1,514	+1.05%
2017	1,497	−0.23%
2023	1,463	−0.38%
Source: INSEE

== See also ==
- Communes of the Loir-et-Cher department
