= Argenton (river) =

River in France

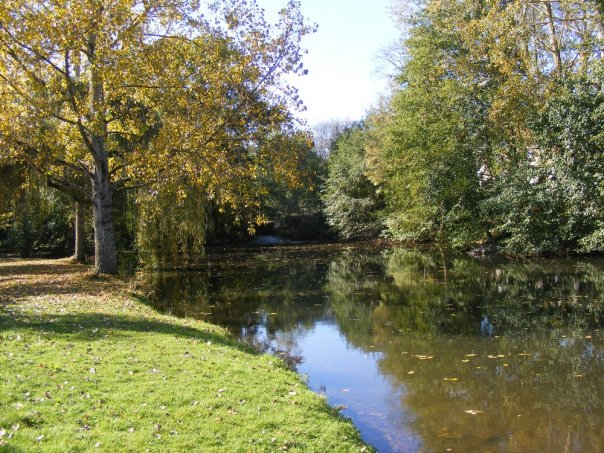

- Location within France Location within Nouvelle-Aquitaine

Location
- Country: France

Physical characteristics
- Mouth
  - location: Thouet
  - coordinates: 47°5′34″N 0°12′15″W
- Length: 71 km (44 mi)

Basin features
- Progression: Thouet→ Loire→ Atlantic Ocean

The Argenton (French pronunciation: [aʁʒɑ̃tɔ̃]) or Argent (French pronunciation: [aʁʒɑ̃] ）) is a 71 km (44 mi) river in the Nouvelle-Aquitaine region in western France. It is a left tributary of the Thouet.

Its source is in the commune of Cirières. Its course crosses the department of Deux-Sèvres. It flows generally northeast through the towns of Le Pin, Nueil-les-Aubiers, Argenton-les-Vallées and Argenton-l'Église, finally flowing into the Thouet near Saint-Martin-de-Sanzay.
