= Beuvron (Loire) =

River in France

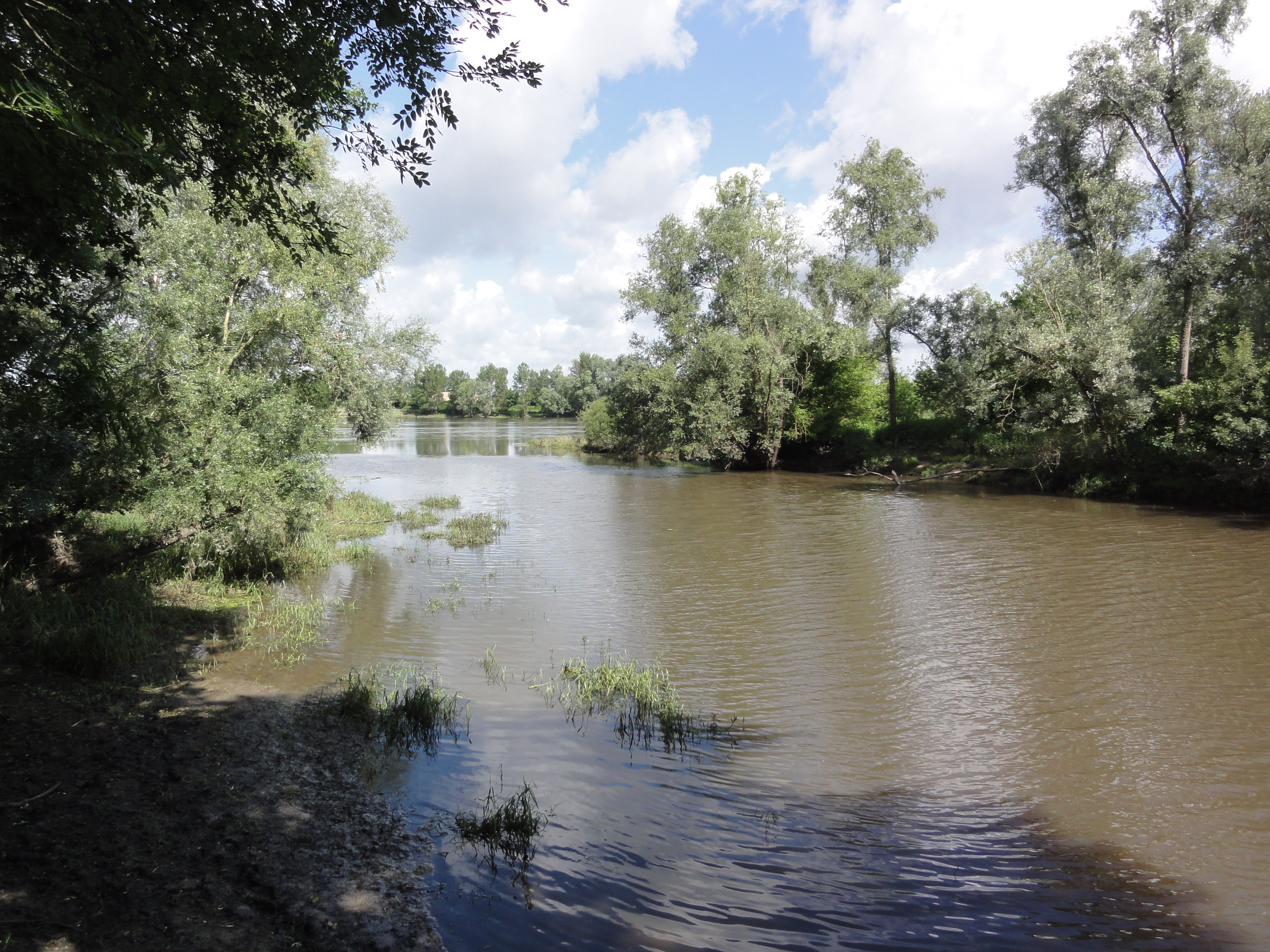

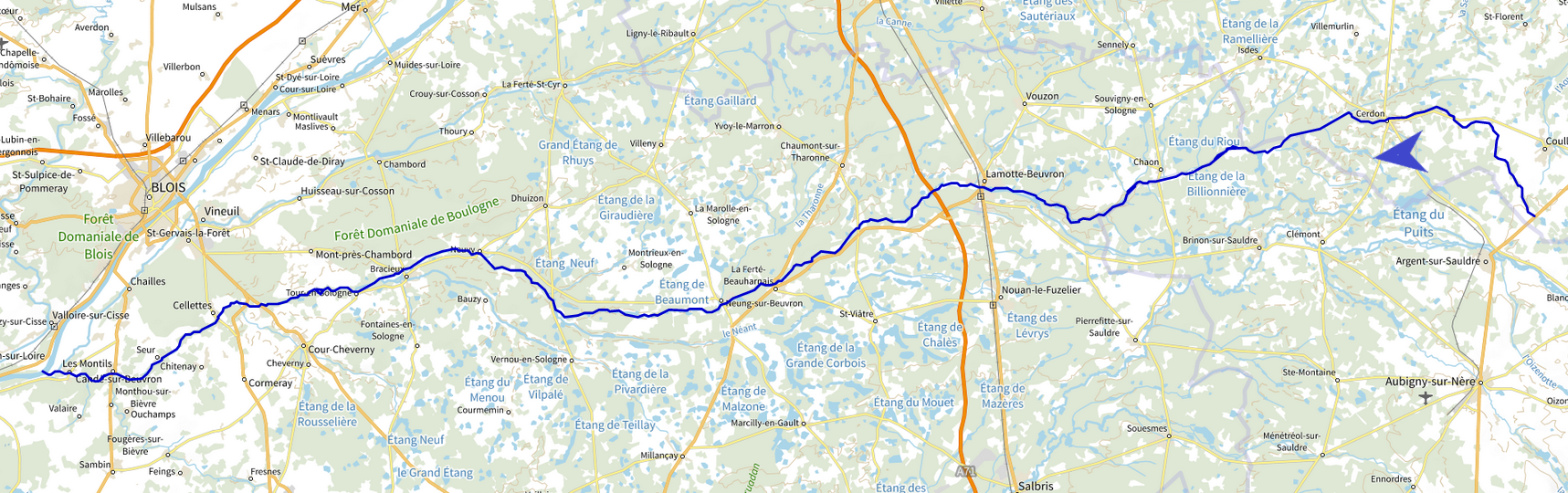

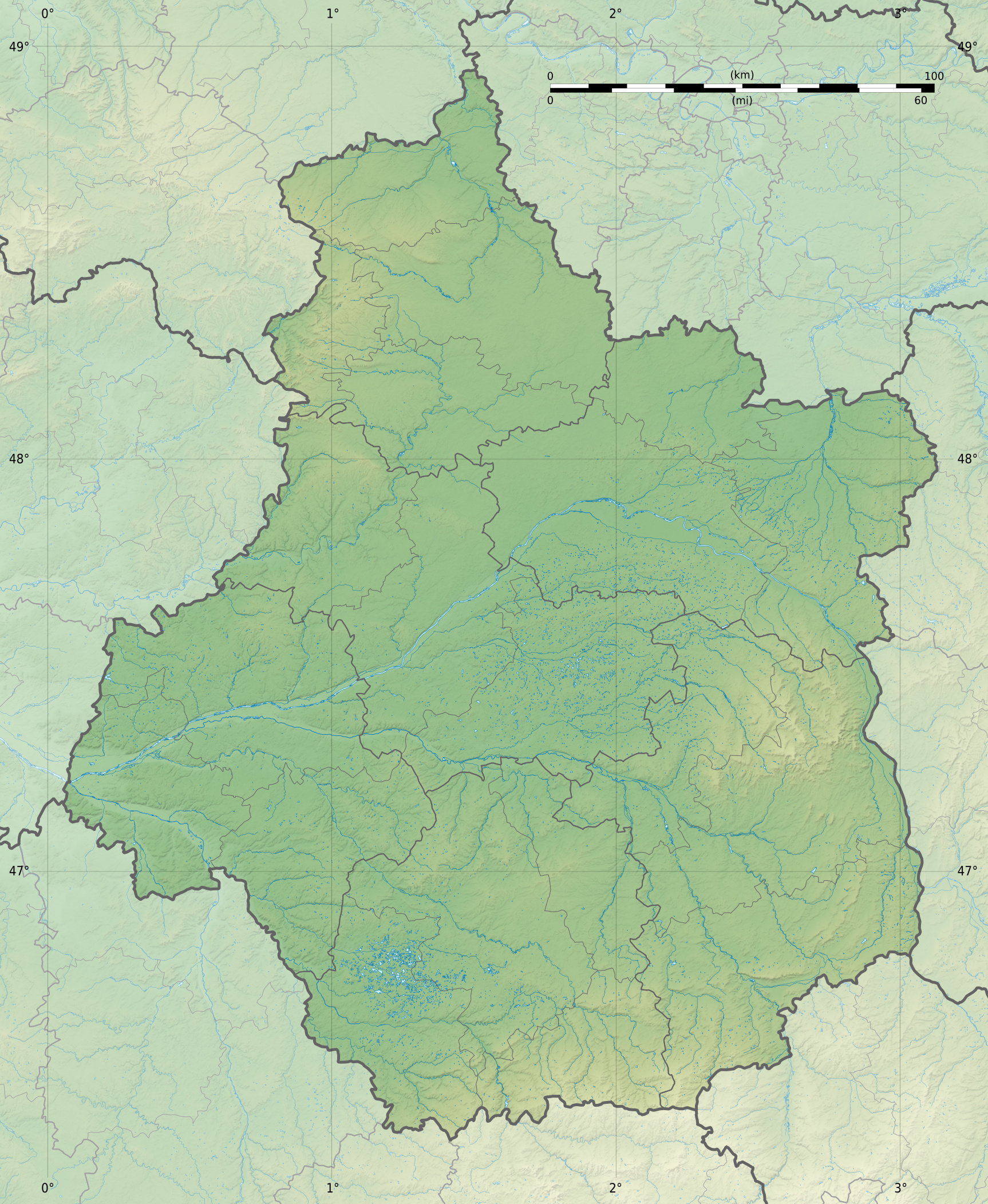
- Location within France Location within Centre-Val de Loire

Location
- Country: France

Physical characteristics
- Source
  - location: Sologne
  - elevation: 160 m (520 ft)
- Mouth: near Candé-sur-Beuvron
  - coordinates: 47°29′38″N 1°14′25″E
- Length: 115 km (71 mi)
- Basin size: 1,440 km^{2} (560 mi^{2})

Basin features
- Progression: Loire→ Atlantic Ocean

The Beuvron (French pronunciation: [bøvʁɔ̃]; Latin: Bebronus) is a 115 km (71 mi) long river in Centre-Val de Loire, France, a left tributary of the river Loire. Its source is near the village of Coullons, southwest of Gien. The Beuvron flows generally west through the following departments and towns:

- Loiret: Cerdon
- Loir-et-Cher: Lamotte-Beuvron, Neung-sur-Beuvron, Bracieux

The Beuvron flows into the Loire at Candé-sur-Beuvron, near Chaumont-sur-Loire.

== Tributaries ==
- Néant (in Vernou-en-Sologne)
- Cosson (in Candé-sur-Beuvron)
