= Thouaret =

River in France

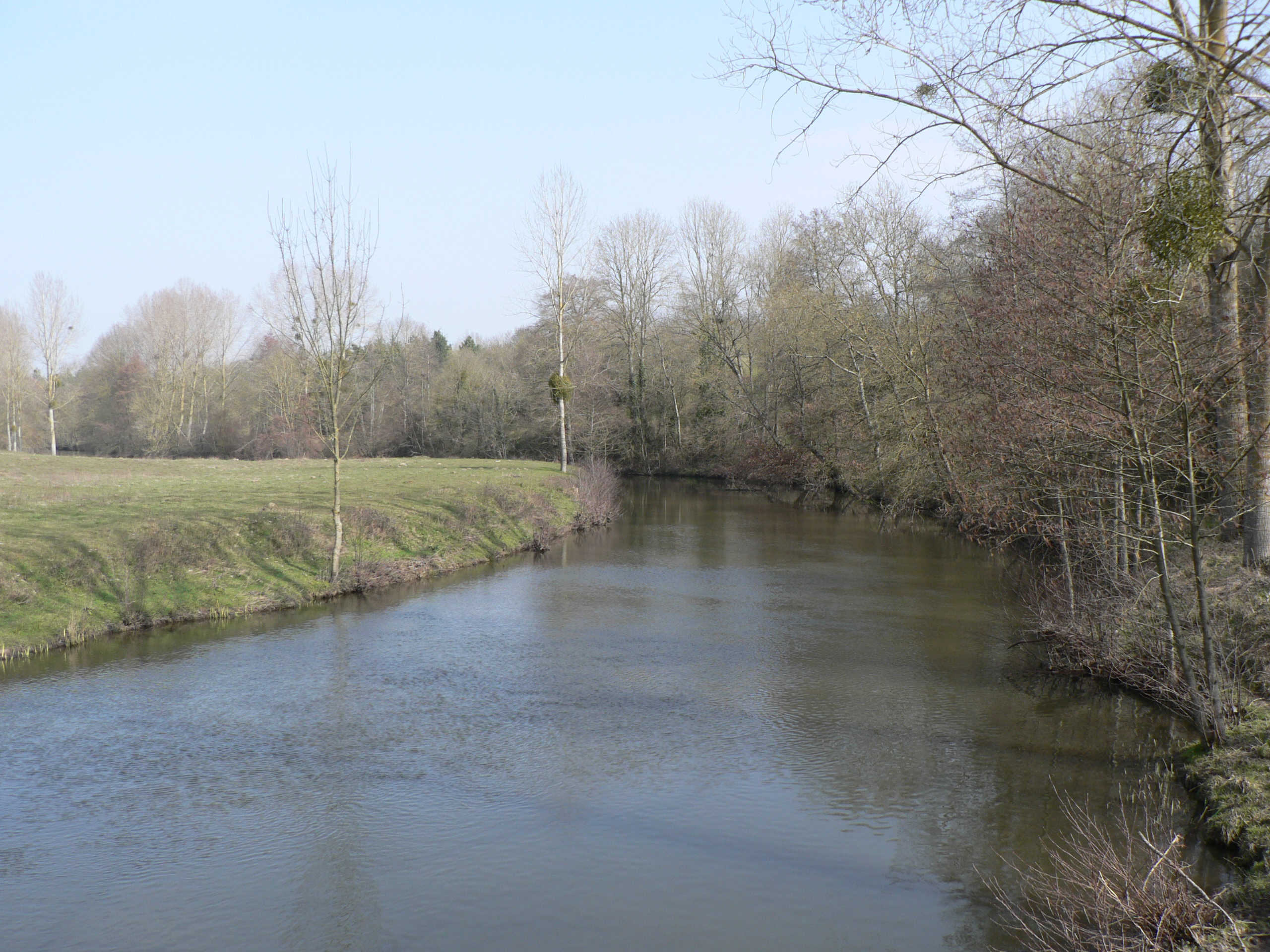

- Location within France Location within Nouvelle-Aquitaine

Location
- Country: France

Physical characteristics
- Mouth
  - location: Thouet
  - coordinates: 46°55′44″N 0°9′28″E
- Length: 52 km (32 mi)

Basin features
- Progression: Thouet→ Loire→ Atlantic Ocean

The Thouaret (French pronunciation: [twaʁɛ]) is a 52 km (32 mi) river in the Nouvelle-Aquitaine region in western France. It is a right tributary of the Thouet.

Its source is in the commune of Chanteloup, and its course crosses the department of Deux-Sèvres, where it flows northeast through the towns of La Chapelle-Saint-Laurent, Chiché and Saint-Varent, finally flowing into the Thouet near Thouars.
