= Villeherviers =

- Commune
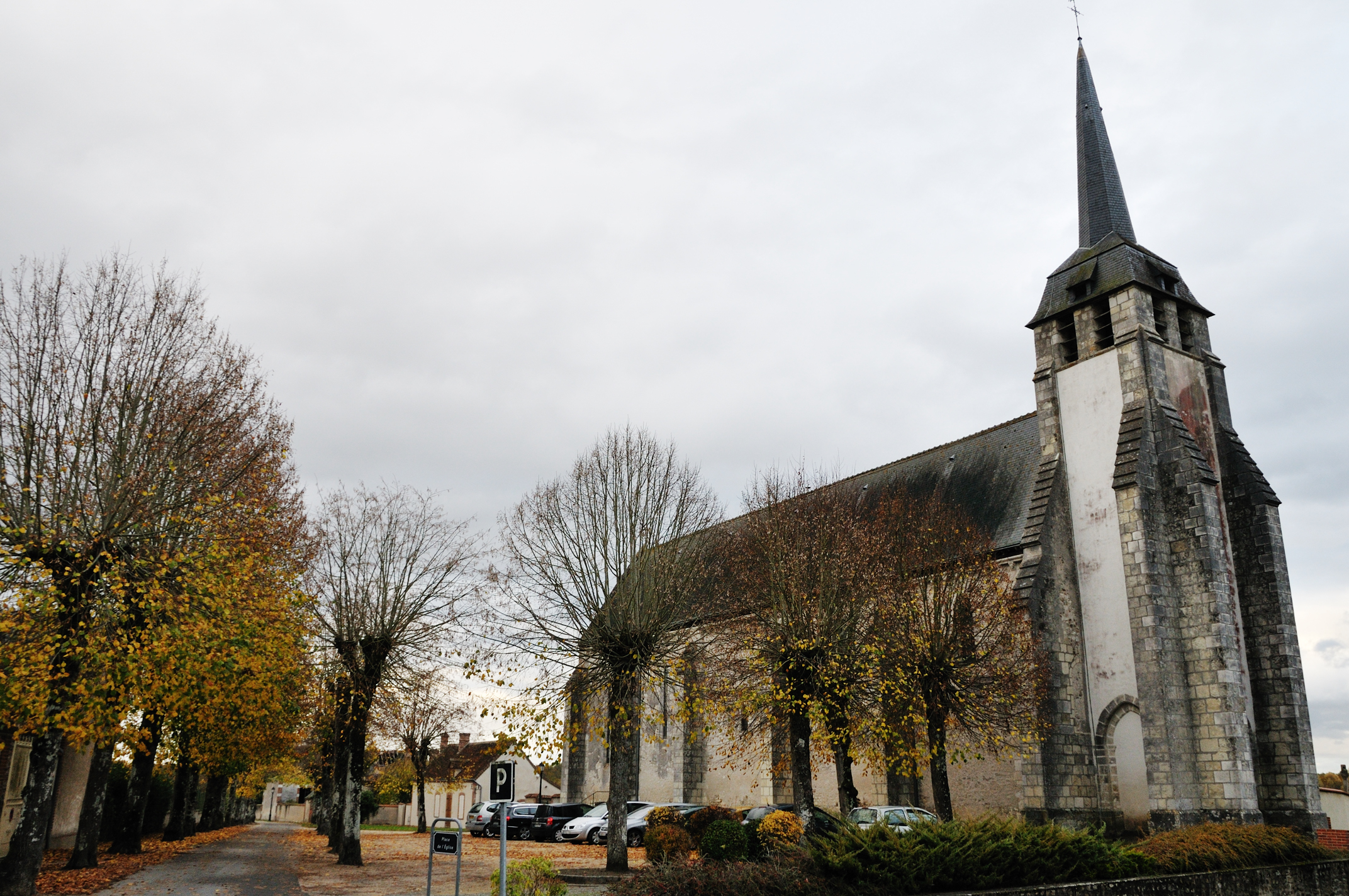
- Church of Saint-Euverte
- Location of Villeherviers
- Location within France Location within Centre-Val de Loire
- Coordinates: 47°22′01″N 1°47′56″E
- Country: France
- Region: Centre-Val de Loire
- Department: Loir-et-Cher
- Arrondissement: Romorantin-Lanthenay
- Canton: Romorantin-Lanthenay
- Intercommunality: Romorantinais et Monestois

Government
  - Mayor (2020–2026): Hubert Bessonnier
- Area^{1}: 38.9 km^{2} (15.0 sq mi)
- Highest elevation: 112 m (367 ft)
- Lowest elevation: 85 m (279 ft)
- Population (2023): 408
  - Density: 10.5/km^{2} (27.2/sq mi)
- Time zone: UTC+01:00 (CET)
  - Summer (DST): UTC+02:00 (CEST)
- INSEE/Postal code: 41282 /41200
- ^{1} French Land Register data, which excludes lakes, ponds, glaciers > 1 km^{2} (0.386 sq mi or 247 acres) and river estuaries.

Villeherviers (French pronunciation: [vil.ɛʁvje]) is a commune in the Loir-et-Cher department in central France.

== Geography ==
The Rère flows northwest through the eastern part of the commune, then flows into the Sauldre, which flows southwest through the middle of the commune.

== Population ==
Historical population
Year	Pop.	±% p.a.
1968	406	—
1975	359	−1.74%
1982	342	−0.69%
1990	533	+5.70%
1999	498	−0.75%
2007	485	−0.33%
2012	484	−0.04%
2017	471	−0.54%
2023	408	−2.36%
Source: INSEE

== See also ==
- Communes of the Loir-et-Cher department
