= Saint-Just-sur-Dive =

- Commune
- Location of Saint-Just-sur-Dive
- Location within France Location within Pays de la Loire
- Coordinates: 47°10′26″N 0°05′56″W
- Country: France
- Region: Pays de la Loire
- Department: Maine-et-Loire
- Arrondissement: Saumur
- Canton: Doué-en-Anjou
- Intercommunality: CA Saumur Val de Loire

Government
  - Mayor (2020–2026): Benoît Ledoux
- Area^{1}: 7.24 km^{2} (2.80 sq mi)
- Elevation: 28 m (92 ft)
- Highest elevation: 39 m (128 ft)
- Lowest elevation: 26 m (85 ft)
- Population (2023): 373
  - Density: 51.5/km^{2} (133/sq mi)
- Time zone: UTC+01:00 (CET)
  - Summer (DST): UTC+02:00 (CEST)
- INSEE/Postal code: 49291 /49260
- ^{1} French Land Register data, which excludes lakes, ponds, glaciers > 1 km^{2} (0.386 sq mi or 247 acres) and river estuaries.

Saint-Just-sur-Dive (French pronunciation: [sɛ̃ ʒy(st) syʁ div], literally Saint Just on Dive) is a commune in the Maine-et-Loire department in western France. It is around 50 km west of Tours, in the Loire–Anjou–Touraine regional nature park.

== See also ==
- Thouet river
- Communes of the Maine-et-Loire department
