= Thouet =

River in France

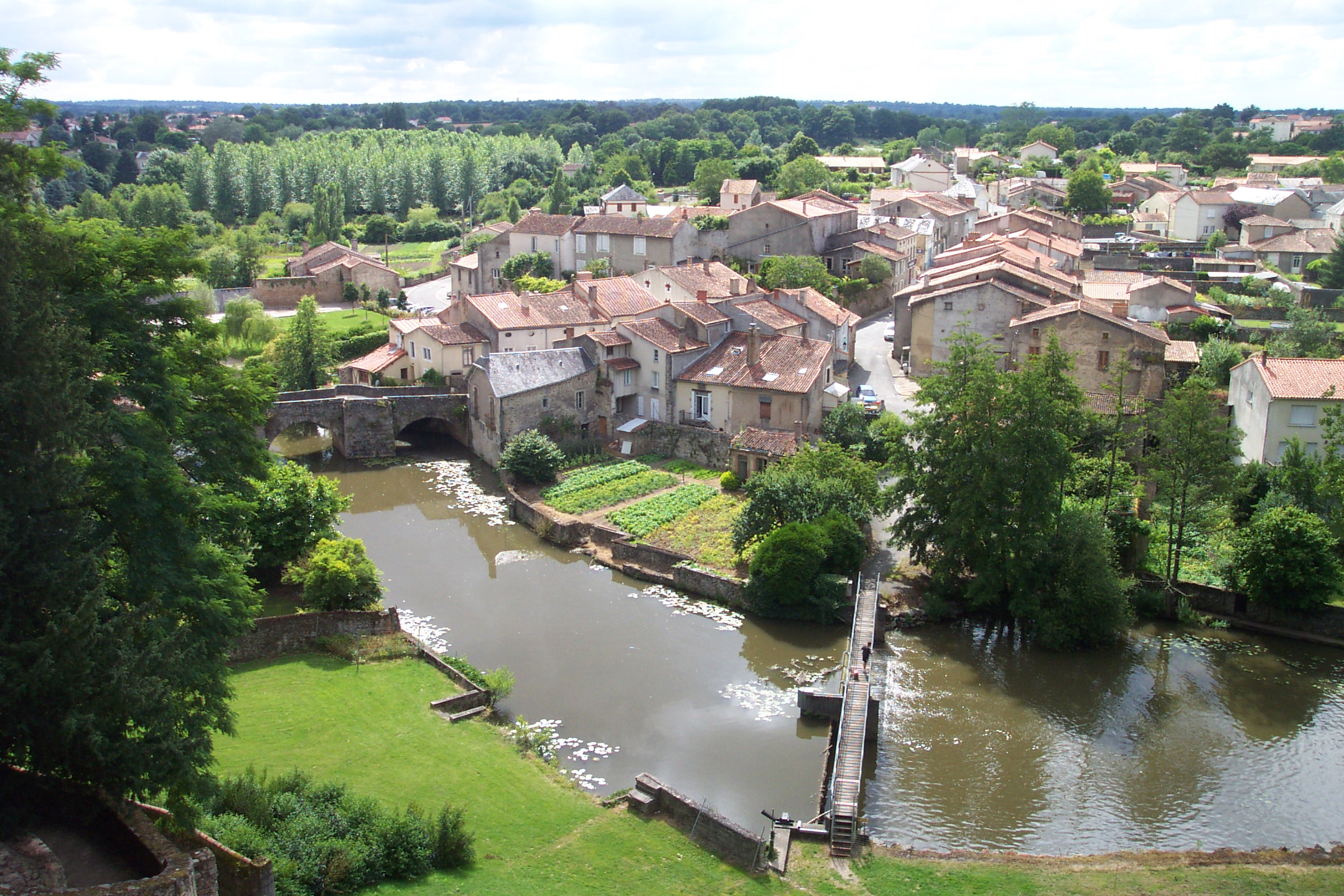

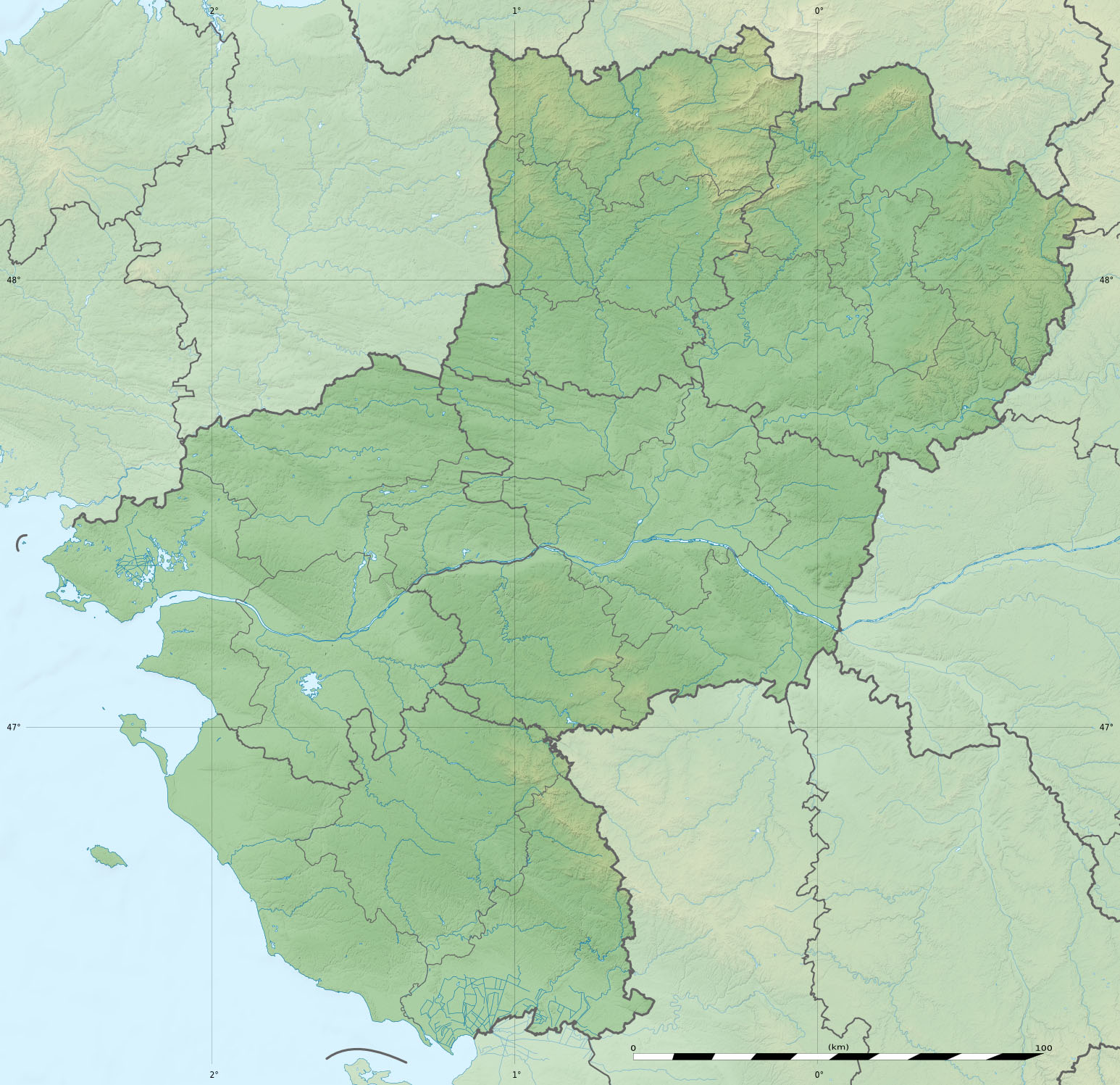
- Location within France Location within Pays de la Loire

Location
- Country: France

Physical characteristics
- Mouth
  - location: Loire
  - coordinates: 47°16′47″N 0°6′38″W
- Length: 142 km (88 mi)
- Basin size: 3,396 km^{2} (1,311 sq mi)

Basin features
- Progression: Loire→ Atlantic Ocean

The Thouet (French pronunciation: [twɛ]) is a tributary of the Loire in the Nouvelle-Aquitaine and Pays de la Loire regions of western France. The Thouet rises at Secondigny, close to the source of the Sèvre Nantaise, and joins the Loire just to the west of Saumur. It is 142.6 km (88.6 mi) long, and drains an area of 3,396 km^{2} (1,311 sq mi).

The river's name derives from the ancient Gallic word for tranquil.

== Course of the river ==
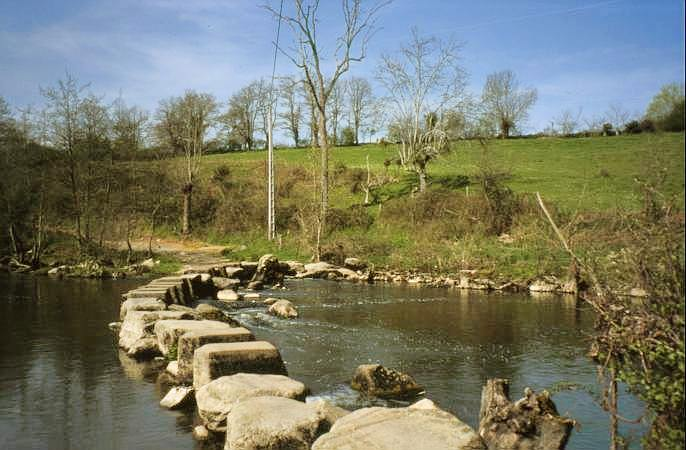
Stepping stones on the Thouet above Thouars

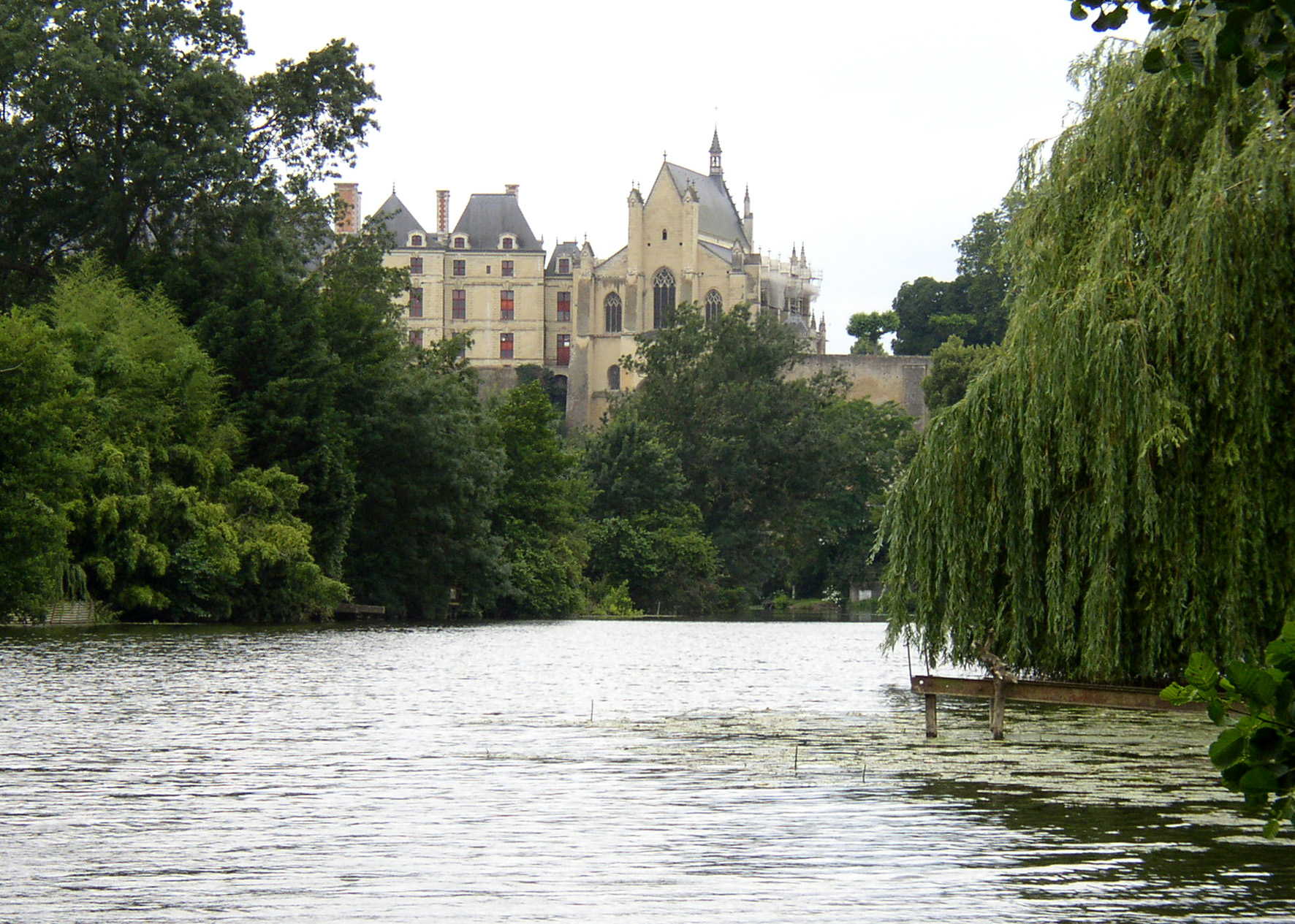
The château rises from the river at Thouars

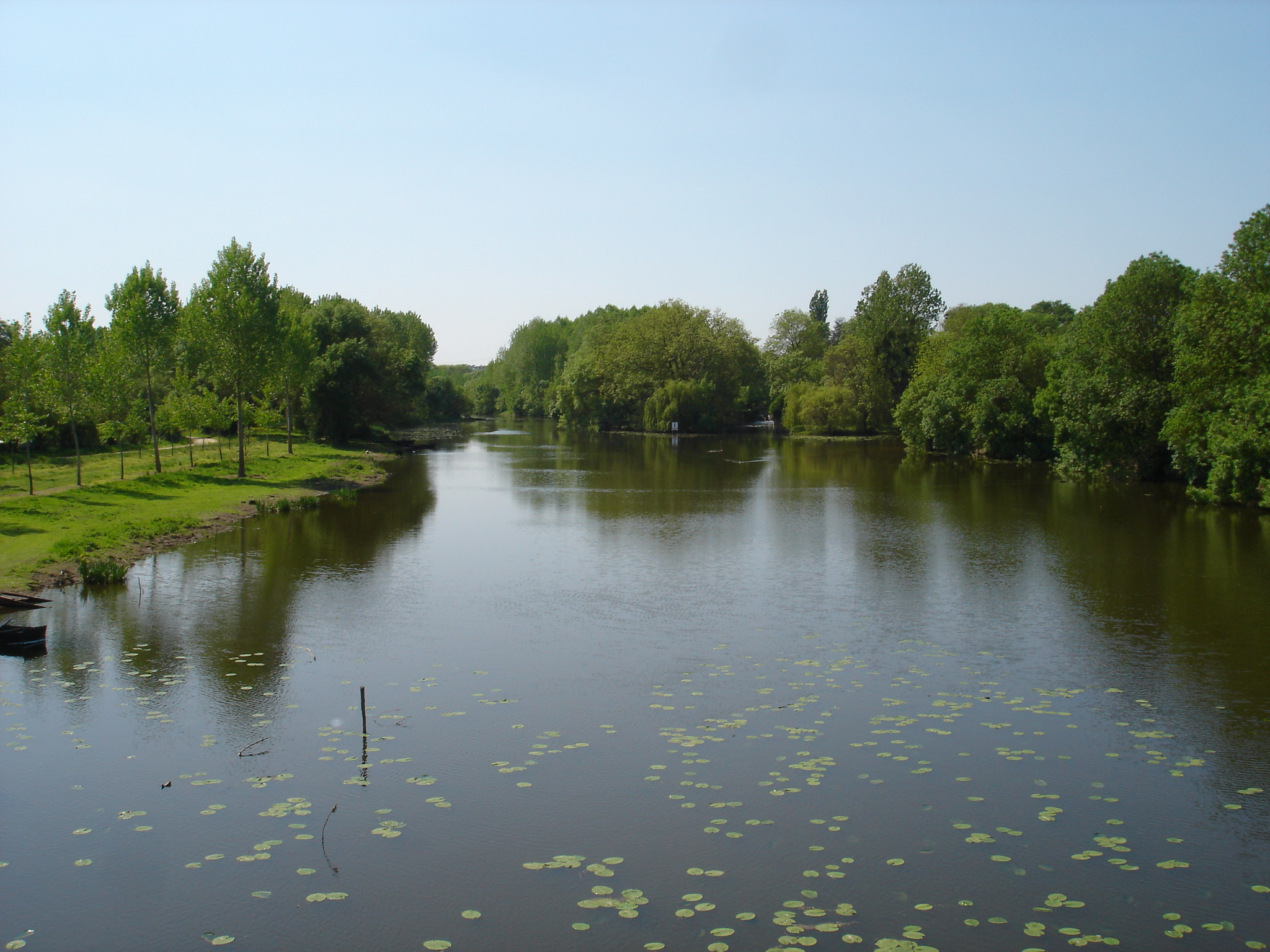
The Thouet downstream of Montreuil-Bellay

The Thouet rises in the Gâtine Vendéenne, the most southern outcrop of the Armorican Massif, at 225 metres (738 ft) altitude. The Armorican Massif is made up of volcanic and metamorphic rocks dating back to the Paleozoic era. This impermeable land does not result in any important aquifers but is an area of significant rainfall runoff. From the source to Parthenay the river flows in a generally east–west direction.

To the east of Parthenay, the river turns north and flows on a generally northward heading for the rest of its course. Between Saint-Loup-Lamairé and Thouars, the river flows onto the Paris Basin, an area of sedimentary rocks where successive marine deposits of periods from the Triassic to the Pliocene were laid down. The nature of the rocks here allows the formation of an aquifer whose water reserves support the river in times of low flow.

In order downstream, the Thouet flows through:

- Secondigny
- Azay-sur-Thouet
- le Tallud
- Parthenay
- Châtillon-sur-Thouet
- Gourgé
- Saint-Loup-Lamairé
- Airvault
- Saint-Généroux
- Missé
- Thouars
- Taizon
- Saint-Martin-de-Sanzay
- Montreuil-Bellay
- Saint-Just-sur-Dive
- Saumur

The principal tributaries of the River Thouet are:

- The Viette, at Parthenay on the right bank
- The Palais, at Parthenay on the left bank
- The Cébron, at Saint-Loup-Lamairé on the left bank
- The Thouaret, near Taizé on the left bank
- The Argenton, at Saint-Martin-de-Sanzay on the left bank
- The Losse, at Montreuil-Bellay on the right bank
- The Dive, at Saint-Just-sur-Dive on the right bank.

For much of its length, the Thouet is paralleled by the GR 36 long-distance walking route, which connects Ouistreham, on the coast of the English Channel, with Bourg-Madame, on the border with Spain. This stretch of the path traces the footsteps of pilgrims from Brittany and Normandy on their way to Santiago de Compostela, and in places crosses the river using the same fords, packhorse bridges and stepping stones the pilgrims would have used.

== Navigation ==
The Thouet was once navigable between its confluence with the Loire and Montreuil-Bellay. The first mention of navigation on the river dates from 1430 when an assembly of merchants in Saumur suggested the creation of a navigation over this stretch of the river, requiring the creation of passages through three mill weirs. It is possible that boats were already carrying goods on the river before that date, the cargo being transferred between boats at each obstacle.

King Charles VII authorised the start of work by letters patent, financing the work by allowing the lords of Montreuil-Bellay to raise a tax on wine that would pass through their land. In the 15th and 16th centuries, the passage through the weirs probably took the form of flash locks. The later pound lock may have been introduced towards the end of the 16th century, and it is known that three pound locks were in use on the river by 1608. A project to make the river navigable up to Thouars was proposed in 1746 but was never executed.

The Dive, a tributary of the Thouet, was canalised in 1834 to create the Canal de la Dive. As part of this development, two modern pound locks with straight sides and mitred gates were built on the Thouet, downstream of the confluence with the Dive. A third modern lock was built at the same time on the Thouet, but upstream from the confluence of the Dive. These locks had dimensions of 32 m (105 ft) length, 5.20 m (17.1 ft) width, and a draught of 1.60 m (5 ft 3 in).

However the new navigation soon faced competition from better roads and the railway, which appeared in the region in 1874. The maximum boat size imposed by the locks proved insufficient, and a proposed enlargement to the larger Freycinet gauge was never realized. The last commercial navigation on the river was in 1920.
