= Viette =

Viette is both a given name and a surname. Notable people with the name include:

- Viette Brown Sprague (1846–1923), American teaching missionary in Kalgan, China
- Pierre Viette (1921–2011), French entomologist
