= Sainte-Eulalie, Ardèche =

Sainte-Eulalie
- Commune
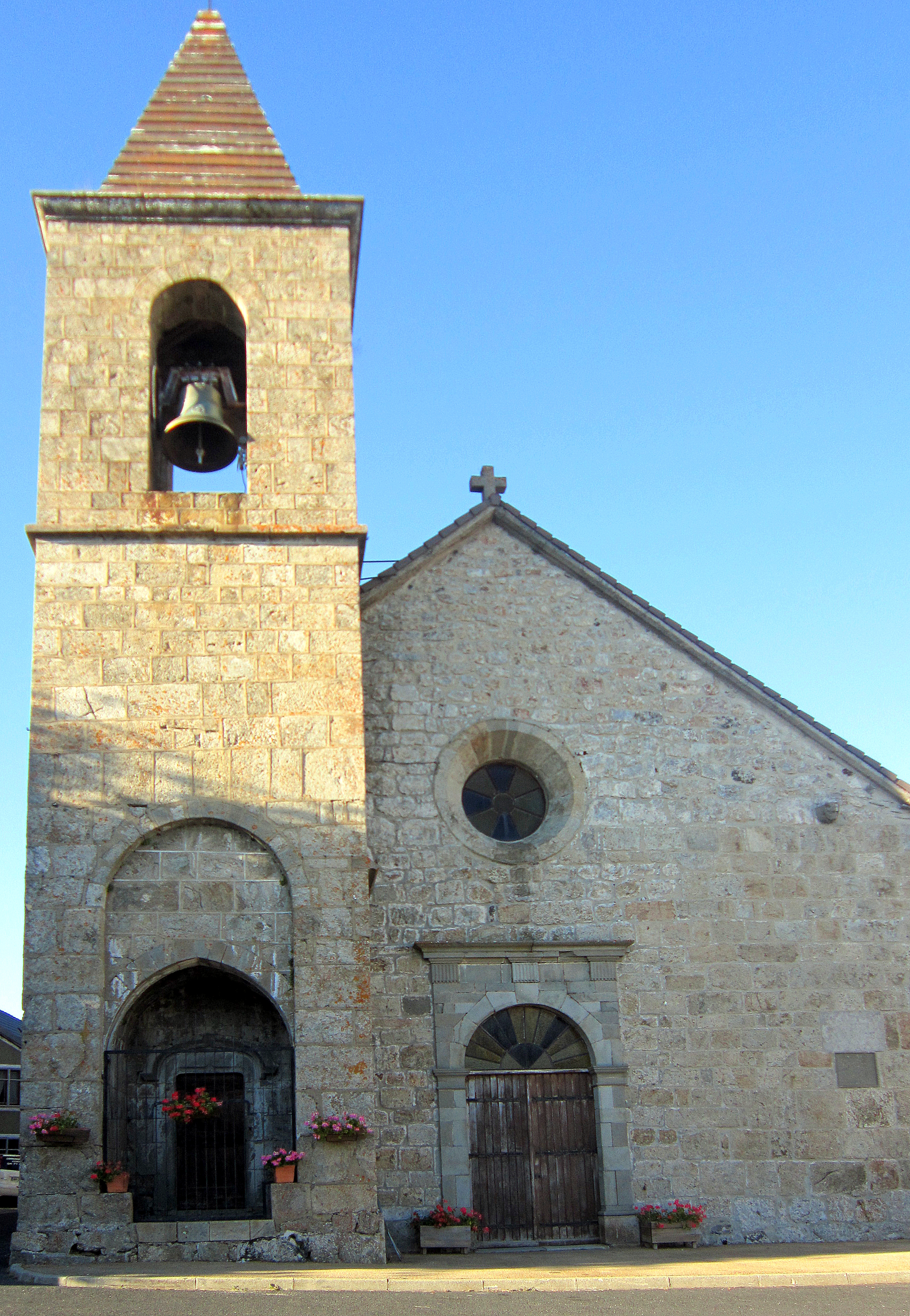
- The church in Sainte-Eulalie
- Location of Sainte-Eulalie
- Location within France Location within Auvergne-Rhône-Alpes
- Coordinates: 44°48′35″N 4°11′24″E
- Country: France
- Region: Auvergne-Rhône-Alpes
- Department: Ardèche
- Arrondissement: Largentière
- Canton: Haute-Ardèche

Government
  - Mayor (2020–2026): Franck Mejean
- Area^{1}: 22.11 km^{2} (8.54 sq mi)
- Elevation: 1,200 m (3,900 ft)
- Highest elevation: 1,534 m (5,033 ft)
- Lowest elevation: 1,156 m (3,793 ft)
- Population (2023): 209
  - Density: 9.45/km^{2} (24.5/sq mi)
- Time zone: UTC+01:00 (CET)
  - Summer (DST): UTC+02:00 (CEST)
- INSEE/Postal code: 07235 /07510
- ^{1} French Land Register data, which excludes lakes, ponds, glaciers > 1 km^{2} (0.386 sq mi or 247 acres) and river estuaries.

Sainte-Eulalie (French pronunciation: [sɛ̃t ølali]; Occitan: Santa Aulalha) is a commune in the Ardèche department in southern France.

== Population ==
Historical population
Year	Pop.	±% p.a.
1968	388	—
1975	349	−1.50%
1982	314	−1.50%
1990	302	−0.49%
1999	253	−1.95%
2007	233	−1.02%
2012	229	−0.35%
2017	215	−1.25%
2023	209	−0.47%
Source: INSEE

== See also ==
- Communes of the Ardèche department
