= Deux-Sèvres's 4th constituency =

Constituency of the French Fifth Republic

The fourth constituency of Deux-Sèvres was a French legislative constituency in the Deux-Sèvres département. It was abolished in the 2010 redistricting of French legislative constituencies. The first seats first Deputy was Albert Brochard of the Union for French Democracy (UDF). The final deputy to hold the seat was Jean Grellier of the Socialist Party who took office in 2007 after unseating Dominique Paillé in 2007.

== History ==
Prior to 1988, a Department's Deputies were elected at-large. Following the 1988 redistricting individual districts were created. Incumbent Deputy Albert Brochard, a member of the Union for French Democracy ran in the district winning the seat in the 1988 French legislative election. He served one term in the seat before being succeeded by fellow UFD politician Dominique Paillé after the 1993 election. Paillé won reelection in the 1997 and 2002 legislative elections. Part way through his third term, Paillé became one of several politicians who left the UFD and joined the Union for a Popular Movement.

In the 2007 election, Paillé ran for reelection but lost to then-Cerizay Mayor Jean Grellier of the Socialist Party. The constituency was abolished in the 2010 redistricting of French legislative constituencies and Grellier was redistricted into Deux-Sèvres's 3rd constituency.

== Composition ==
Location of the constituency within Deux-Sèvres

The constituency was located in the northern portion of the Deux-Sèvres cabinet, the area leaned to the right politically. It consisted of the communes Argenton-Château, Bressuire, Cerizay, Saint-Varent, and Thouars.

== List of deputies representing the constituency ==
Legislature	Start of mandate	End of mandate	Deputy	Political party	Ref(s)
9	23 June 1988	1 April 1993	Albert Brochard	Union for French Democracy (UFD)	
10	2 April 1993	21 April 1997	Dominique Paillé	Union for French Democracy (UFD)	
11	12 June 1997	18 June 2002	Dominique Paillé	Union for French Democracy (UFD)	
12	19 June 2002	19 June 2007	Dominique Paillé	Union for French Democracy (UFD)	
12	19 June 2002	19 June 2007	Dominique Paillé	Union for a Popular Movement (UMP)	
13	20 June 2007	19 June 2012	Jean Grellier	Socialist Party (PS)	
