= Mauzé =

Mauzé is part of the name of 2 communes in the Deux-Sèvres department of France:

- Mauzé-sur-le-Mignon
- Mauzé-Thouarsais
