= 2024 French legislative election in Deux-Sèvres =

Following the first round of the 2024 French legislative election on 30 June 2024, runoff elections in each constituency where no candidate received a vote share greater than 50 percent were scheduled for 7 July. Candidates permitted to stand in the runoff elections needed to either come in first or second place in the first round or achieve more than 12.5 percent of the votes of the entire electorate (as opposed to 12.5 percent of the vote share due to low turnout).

== Deux-Sèvres ==
=== 1st constituency ===
Candidate	Party or alliance		First round		Second round	
Candidate	Party or alliance		Votes	%	Votes	%
Bastien Marchive	Ensemble	Renaissance	25,247	40.24	26,655	42.37
Nathalie Lanzi	New Popular Front	Socialist Party	20,571	32.79	20,526	32.63
Dorothée Champeau	National Rally		15,447	24.62	15,732	25.01
Virginie Juliard	Reconquête		773	1.23		
Danielle Vauzelle	Far-left	Lutte Ouvrière	698	1.11		
Marc René Gaillard	Miscellaneous left	Independent	0	0.00		
Total			62,736	100.00	62,913	100.00
Valid votes			62,736	96.93	62,913	97.62
Invalid votes			692	1.07	475	0.74
Blank votes			1,298	2.01	1,059	1.64
Total votes			64,726	100.00	64,447	100.00
Registered voters/turnout			91,748	70.55	91,752	70.24

=== 2nd constituency ===
Candidate	Party or alliance		First round		Second round	
Candidate	Party or alliance		Votes	%	Votes	%
Delphine Batho	New Popular Front	The Ecologists	25,435	38.57	37,808	59.21
Mélody Garault	National Rally		22,500	34.12	26,048	40.79
Frédéric Bizard	Ensemble	Democratic Movement	10,536	15.98		
Émilie Baudrez	The Republicans		6,107	9.26		
Guy Bourdon	Reconquête		760	1.15		
Roger Gorizzutti	Far-left	Lutte Ouvrière	607	0.92		
Total			65,945	100.00	63,856	100.00
Valid votes			65,945	96.61	63,856	93.40
Invalid votes			835	1.22	1,296	1.90
Blank votes			1,482	2.17	3,216	4.70
Total votes			68,262	100.00	68,368	100.00
Registered voters/turnout			98,054	69.62	98,055	69.72

=== 3rd constituency ===
Candidate	Party or alliance		First round		Second round	
Candidate	Party or alliance		Votes	%	Votes	%
Philippe Robin	Union of the far right	The Republicans	19,585	35.23	22,936	41.89
Jean-Marie Fiévet	Ensemble	Renaissance	17,310	31.14	31,821	58.11
Juliette Woillez	New Popular Front	La France Insoumise	10,533	18.95		
Mattieu Manceau	The Republicans		7,491	13.48		
Maryse Vallée	Far-left	Lutte Ouvrière	665	1.20		
Jacky Durand	Miscellaneous left	Independent	0	0.00		
Total			55,584	100.00	54,757	100.00
Valid votes			55,584	95.94	54,757	94.37
Invalid votes			1,015	1.75	980	1.69
Blank votes			1,339	2.31	2,289	3.94
Total votes			57,938	100.00	58,026	100.00
Registered voters/turnout			85,314	67.91	85,329	68.00
