= Sainte-Radegonde, Deux-Sèvres =

Sainte-Radegonde
- Part of Thouars
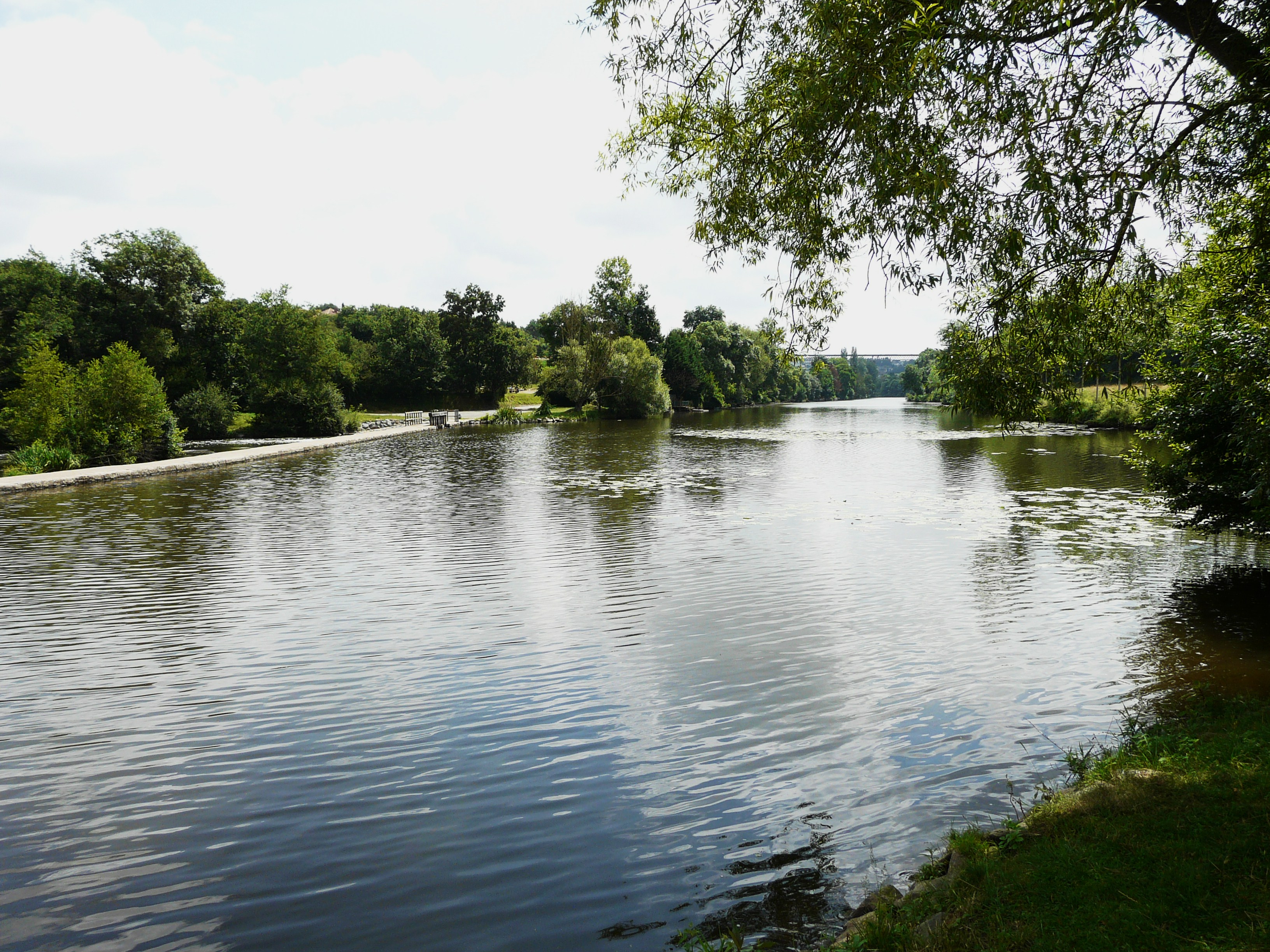
- The river Thouet in Sainte-Radegonde
- Location of Sainte-Radegonde
- Location within France Location within Nouvelle-Aquitaine
- Coordinates: 46°59′07″N 0°14′45″W
- Country: France
- Region: Nouvelle-Aquitaine
- Department: Deux-Sèvres
- Arrondissement: Bressuire
- Canton: Thouars
- Commune: Thouars
- Area^{1}: 7.52 km^{2} (2.90 sq mi)
- Elevation: 60 m (200 ft)
- Highest elevation: 111 m (364 ft)
- Lowest elevation: 43 m (141 ft)
- Population (2022): 1,801
  - Density: 239/km^{2} (620/sq mi)
- Time zone: UTC+01:00 (CET)
  - Summer (DST): UTC+02:00 (CEST)
- Postal code: 79100
- ^{1} French Land Register data, which excludes lakes, ponds, glaciers > 1 km^{2} (0.386 sq mi or 247 acres) and river estuaries.

Sainte-Radegonde (French pronunciation: [sɛ̃t ʁadɡɔ̃d]; sometimes spelled Sainte-Radégonde) is a former commune in the Deux-Sèvres department in western France. On 1 January 2019, it was merged into the commune Thouars.

== See also ==
- Communes of the Deux-Sèvres department
