= Jean-Marie Morisset =

French politician

Jean-Marie Morisset (born 18 August 1947 in Parthenay) is a former French politician. He represented the 3rd constituency of the Deux-Sèvres department in the National Assembly of France from 1993 to 2012. As a member of the Union for a Popular Movement.
