= Saint-Laon Church, Thouars =

Catholic church

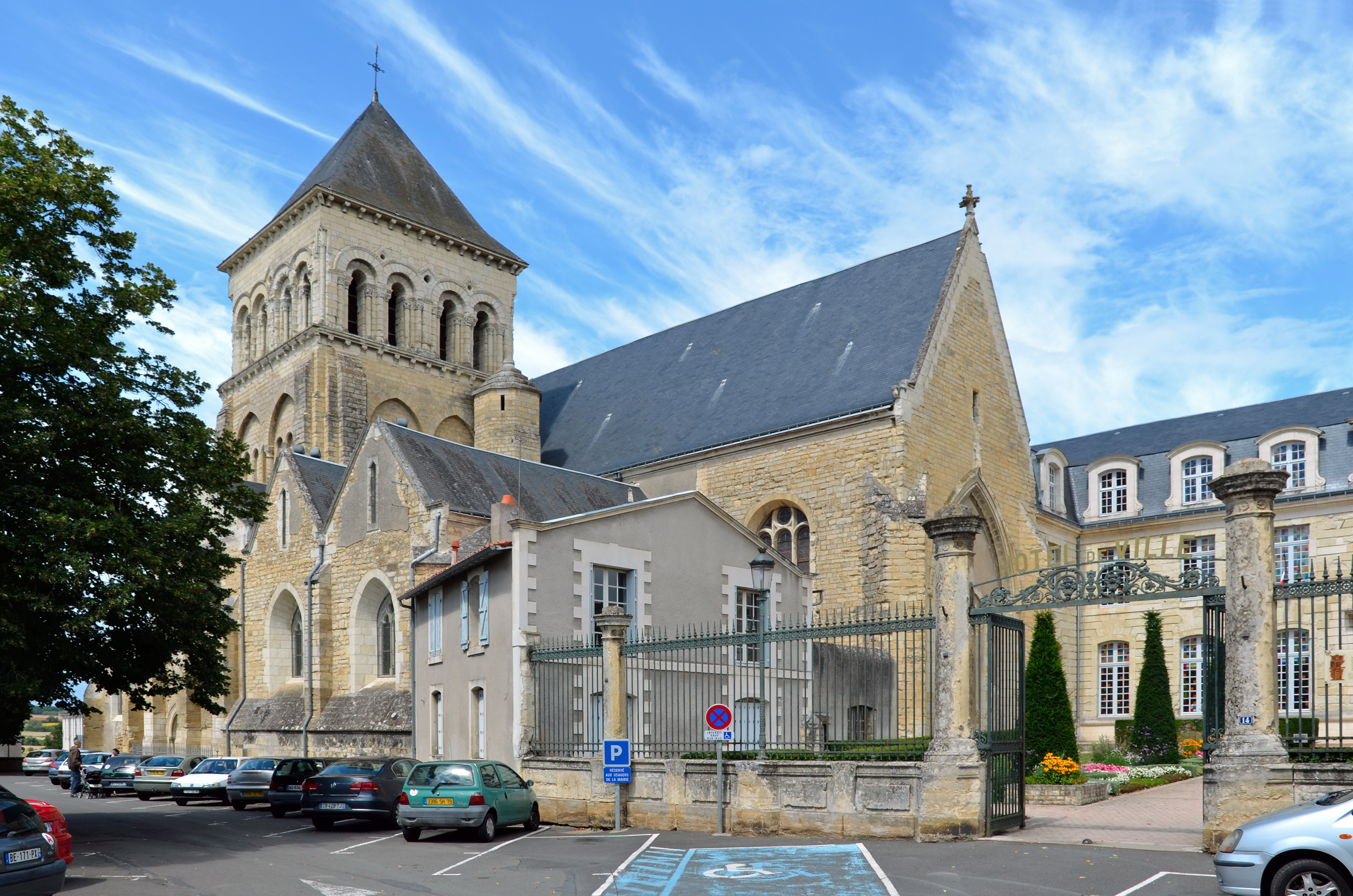
- Saint-Laon Church seen from the southeast.
- Interactive map of Saint-Laon Church, Thouars
- Location: Deux-Sèvres, Thouars
- Coordinates: 46°58′33″N 0°13′01″W
- Type: Church
- Dedicated to: Catholic Church
- Heritage status: Listed as a historic monument (1988)

The Saint-Laon Church is a Catholic church in Thouars, Deux-Sèvres France. Originally serving as the abbey church of the Abbey of Saint-Laon, founded in the early 11th century, it has been listed as a historic monument since 1988.

== History ==
The church is located in the northeastern part of the Deux-Sèvres department, in the town center of Thouars, with its northeastern side adjoining the town hall.

The Abbey of Saint-Laon was founded in 1021 by Achard, lord of Saint-Laon-sur-Dive in Vienne. It was a small community, initially comprising four canons. A relic, the mummified arm of Saint Laon (Laud of Coutances), was placed in its abbey church, the Church of Saint-Laon. The church was originally dedicated to both Our Lady and Saint Laon. It was first attached to the diocese of Poitiers, under the episcopates of Isembert I, Isembert II, and Peter II (Bishop of Poitiers), until 1096.

A deed dated March 7, 1096, records the donation of the Abbey of Saint-Laon to a Benedictine abbey in Saumur. This led to a conflict with the canons, who in 1107 opted for autonomy and adopted the Augustinian rule. The abbey prospered through donations from the viscounts of Thouars, and the number of canons rose to twelve.

Shortly before she died in 1445, Margaret of Scotland commissioned the construction of the Chapel of the Holy Sepulchre, adjoining the church choir, where she wished to be buried. She was interred there in 1479, after an initial burial in Châlons-en-Champagne. In the 15th century, after nearly three centuries without major works, the building underwent significant modifications aimed at harmonization, preserving only the original bell tower and the southern gable. The visible wooden framework was replaced with stone vaults, additional openings were created, and a spire was added.

However, the functioning of the abbey gradually declined. The monks abandoned communal life, lived in individual houses, and adopted customs described as "little compatible with their ecclesiastical state." In 1569, the abbey was pillaged by Protestants. In 1667, the canons of the Congregation of France (the Génovéfains) took control of the abbey, restored discipline, undertook interior works, and replaced the furnishings.

On December 10, 1711, a hurricane caused significant damage to the church (impacting even in Paris and Reims), including the collapse of the bell tower spire, which resulted in one death. Additional storms in 1817 and 1847 further damaged the structure. During the French Revolution, the Abbey of Saint-Laon was dissolved, and the church was converted into a parish church. The remaining convent buildings were either destroyed or repurposed, later serving as a school and subsequently as the town hall.

In 1840, the bell tower was designated a historic monument and subsequently restored in the 1860s. Restorations carried out without authorization between 1863 and 1877 led to the loss of the church's landmark classification in 1879, although the bell tower retained its status. The building was added to the Supplementary Inventory of Historic Monuments on October 22, 1926, and was classified on February 3, 1988, with the new decree revoking the earlier listing. Further restoration work was undertaken in the mid-1990s.

== Architecture ==
The current church consists of three vaulted bays, with a fourth bay opening onto the three bays of the choir. Its architectural style reflects multiple construction periods, spanning from the 11th to the 15th century. The building incorporates various materials, including tuffeau, ironstone, and marble, which assist in dating its different sections.

The bell tower, dating from the 12th century, is an example of Romanesque art in Poitou. At the time of its construction, the church consisted of a single nave with an unknown chevet. The structure was later extensively remodeled, and only a few elements of the original church remain, mainly in the nave and the west façade.The roof frame was initially exposed, before barrel vaults were constructed above the nave. These were partially replaced during the Gothic period by ribbed vaults and other Gothic-style vaults in specific sections of the church.

== Photo gallery ==
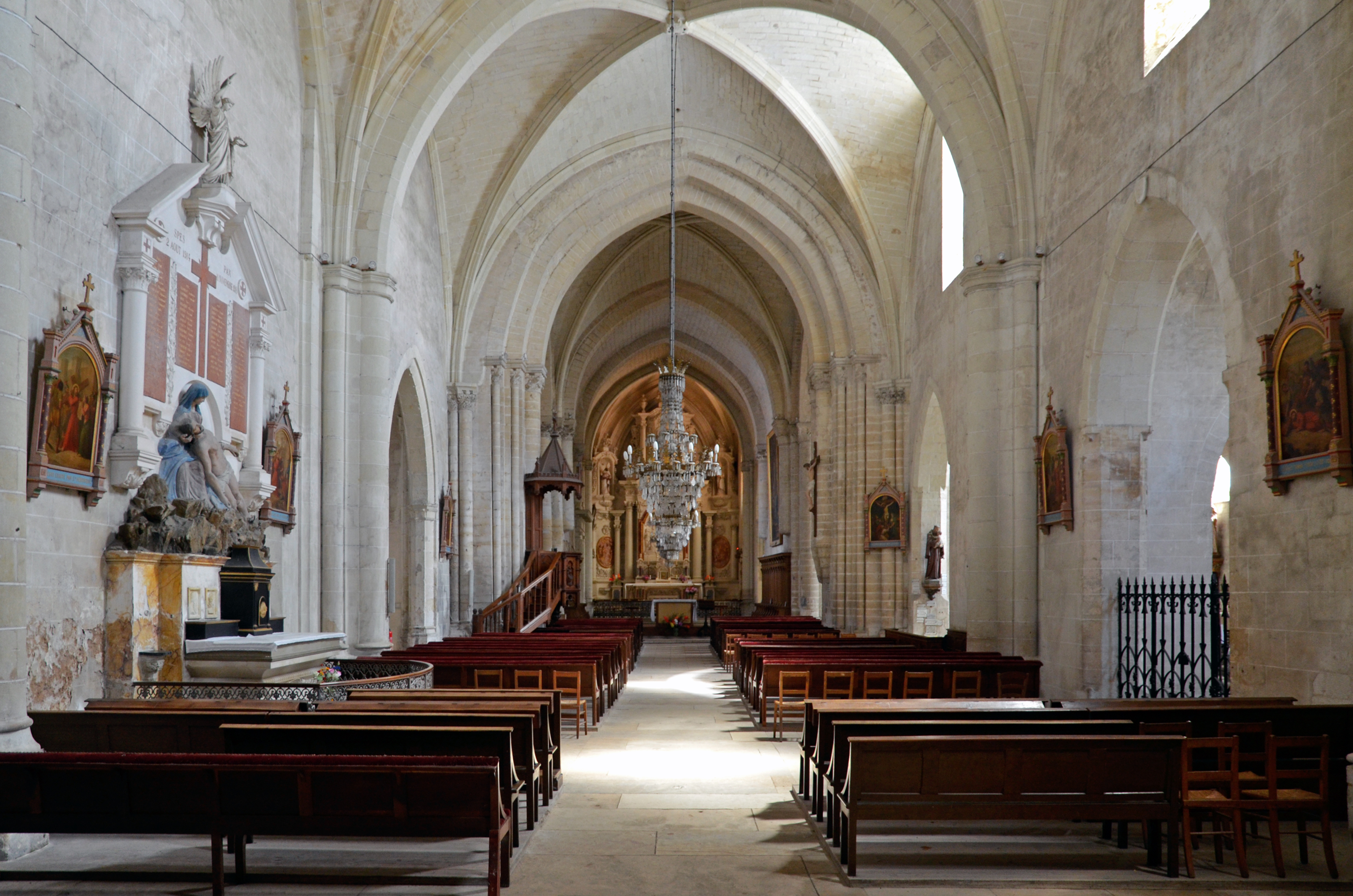
Nave.

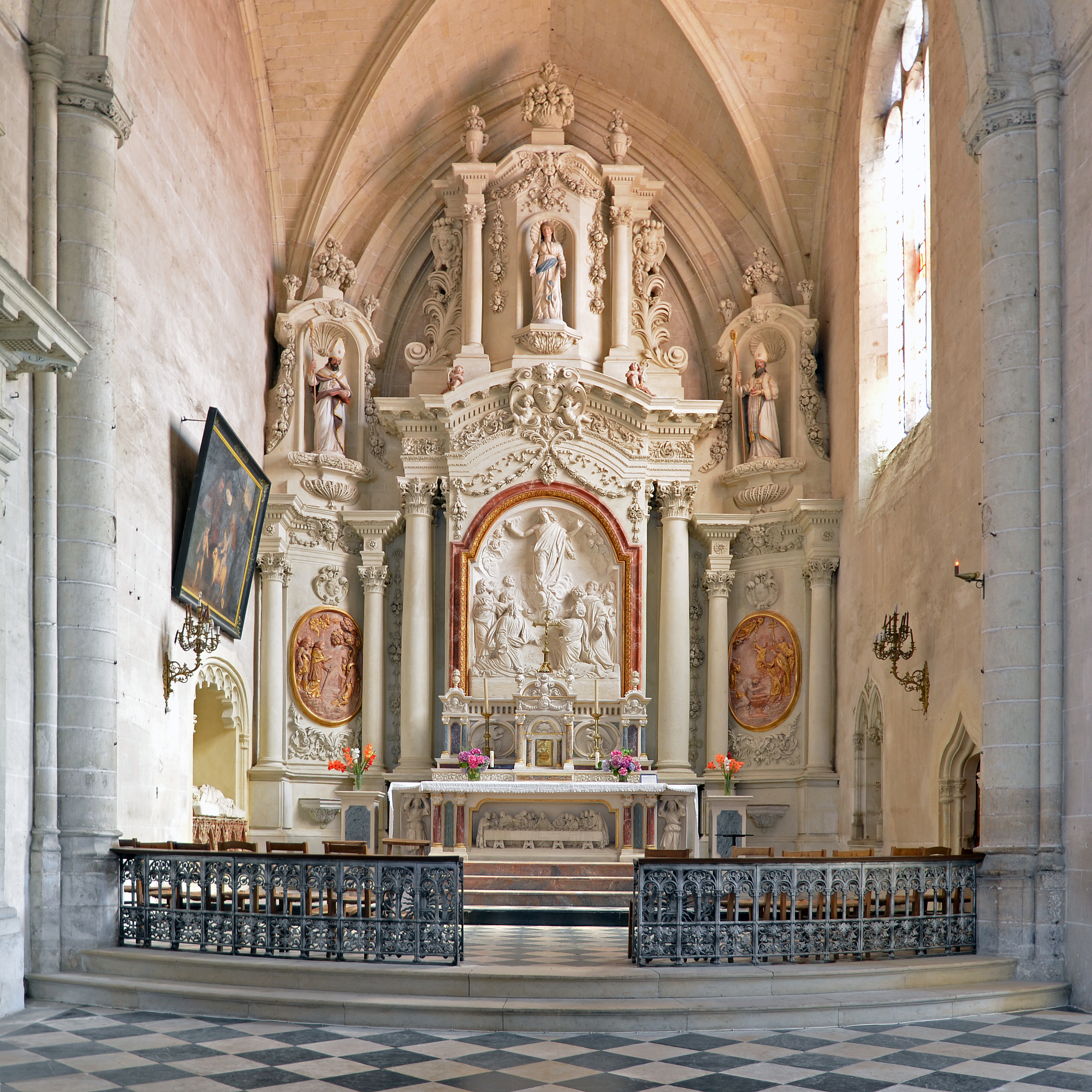
Baroque altarpiece.

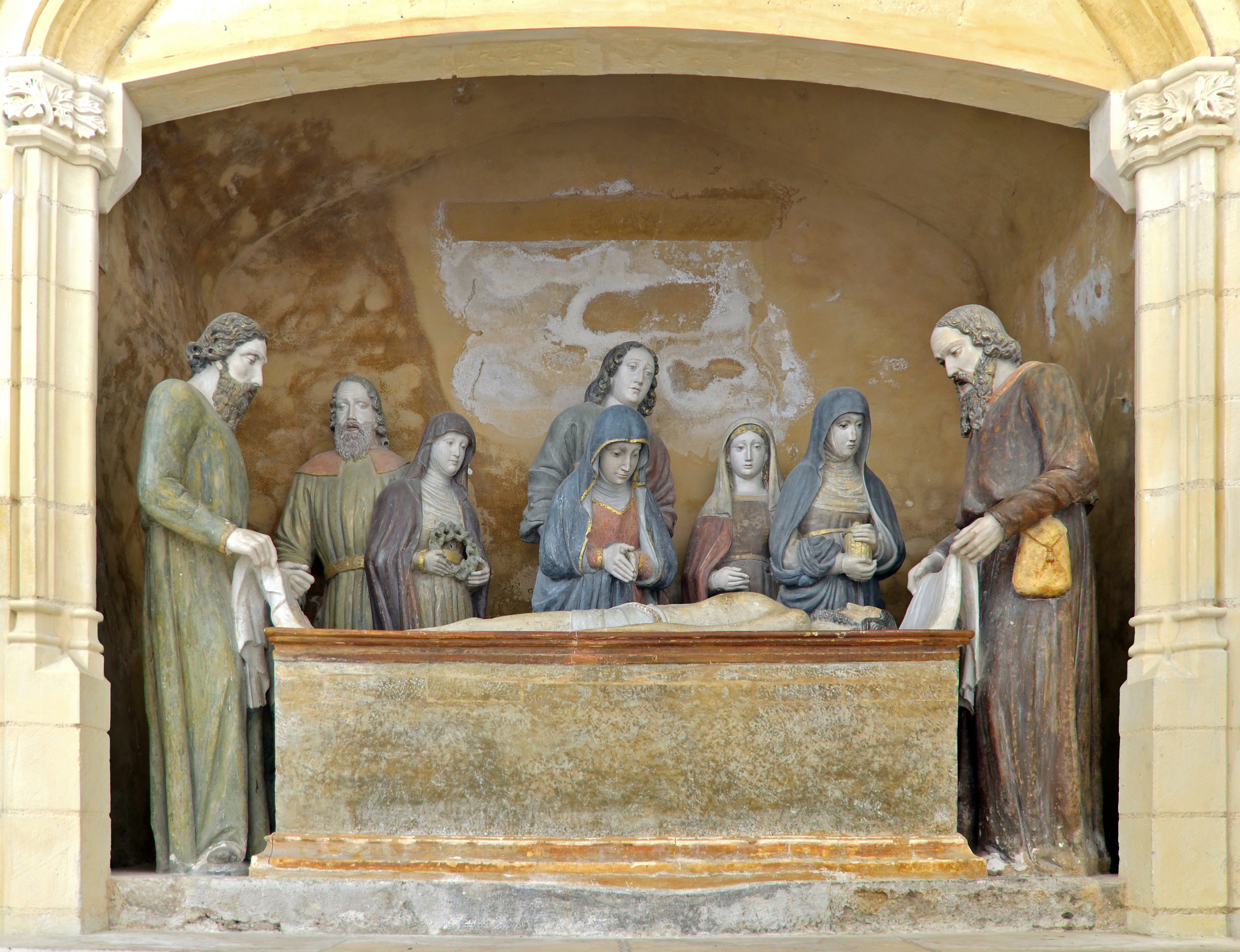
Entombment in the chapel of Margaret of Scotland.

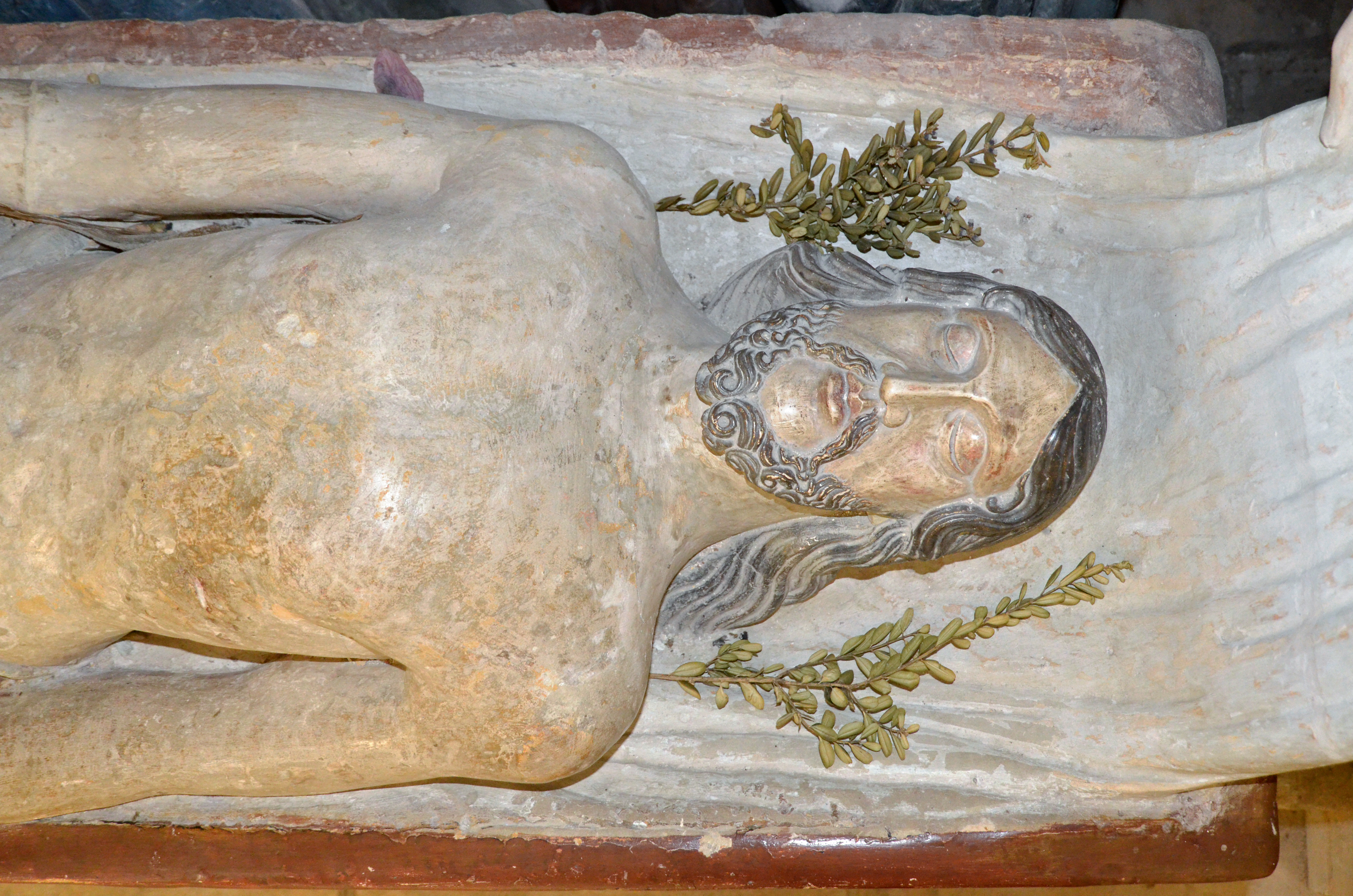
Detail of the Entombment.

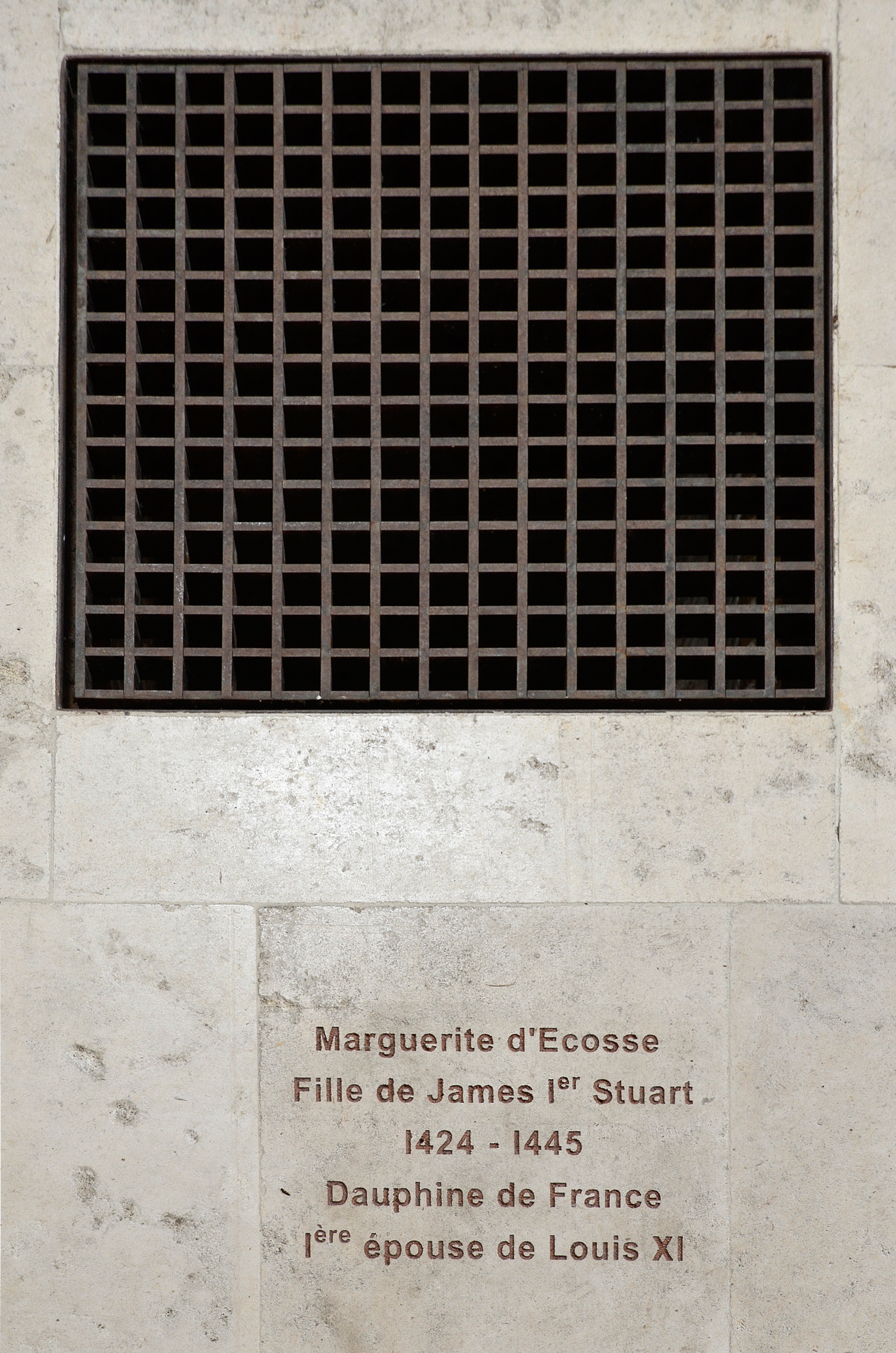
Vault of Margaret of Scotland, Dauphine of France.

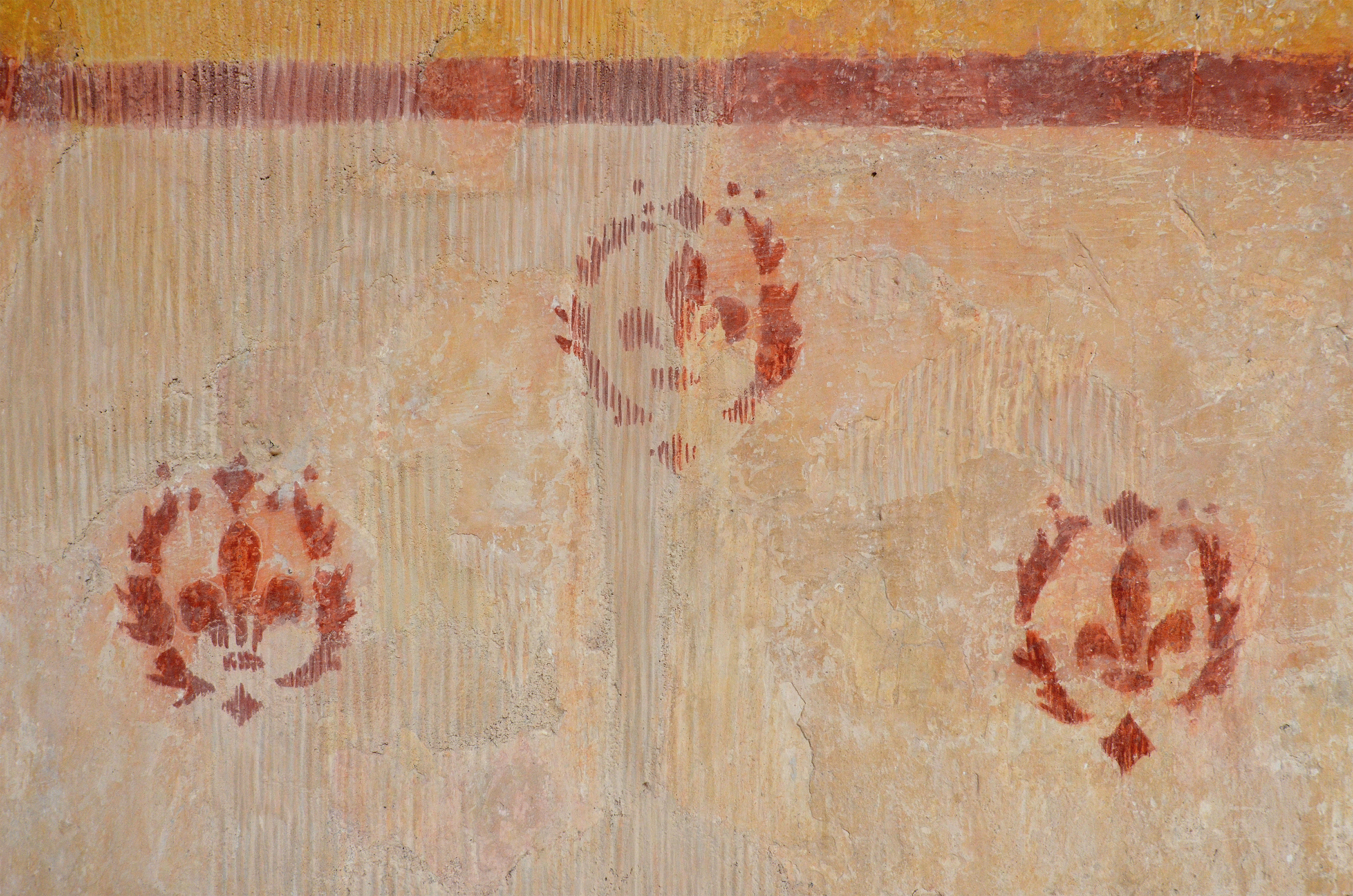
Lilies painted on a wall of the chapel.

== See also ==
- Catholic Church
- Thouars
- Deux-Sèvres
- Monument historique

== Bibliography ==
- Congrès archéologique de France, 159e session : Monuments des Deux-Sèvres [French Archaeological Congress, 159th session: Monuments of Deux-Sèvres] (in French). Société archéologique de France. 2001. pp. 323–331.
- Bègue, Christelle; Maurin, Sébastien (2010). Thouars de A à Z [Thouars from A to Z] (in French). Éditions Alan Sutton. pp. 9–13. ISBN 978-2-813-80207-1.
- Bourgeois, Luc (2000). Les petites villes du Haut-Poitou de l'Antiquité au Moyen Âge : Formes et Monuments [Small towns in Haut-Poitou from Antiquity to the Middle Ages: Forms and Monuments] (in French). Vol. 1: Bressuire, Brioux-sur-Boutonne, Loudun, Montmorillon, Saint-Savin-sur-Gartempe, Thouars. Association des publications chauvinoises. pp. 119–120. ISBN 2-909-16535-3.
