= Cantons of the Deux-Sèvres department =

The following is a list of the 17 cantons of the Deux-Sèvres department, in France, following the French canton reorganisation which came into effect in March 2015:

- Autize-Égray
- Bressuire
- Celles-sur-Belle
- Cerizay
- Frontenay-Rohan-Rohan
- La Gâtine
- Mauléon
- Melle
- Mignon-et-Boutonne
- Niort-1
- Niort-2
- Niort-3
- Parthenay
- La Plaine Niortaise
- Saint-Maixent-l'École
- Thouars
- Le Val de Thouet
