= Missé =

- Part of Thouars
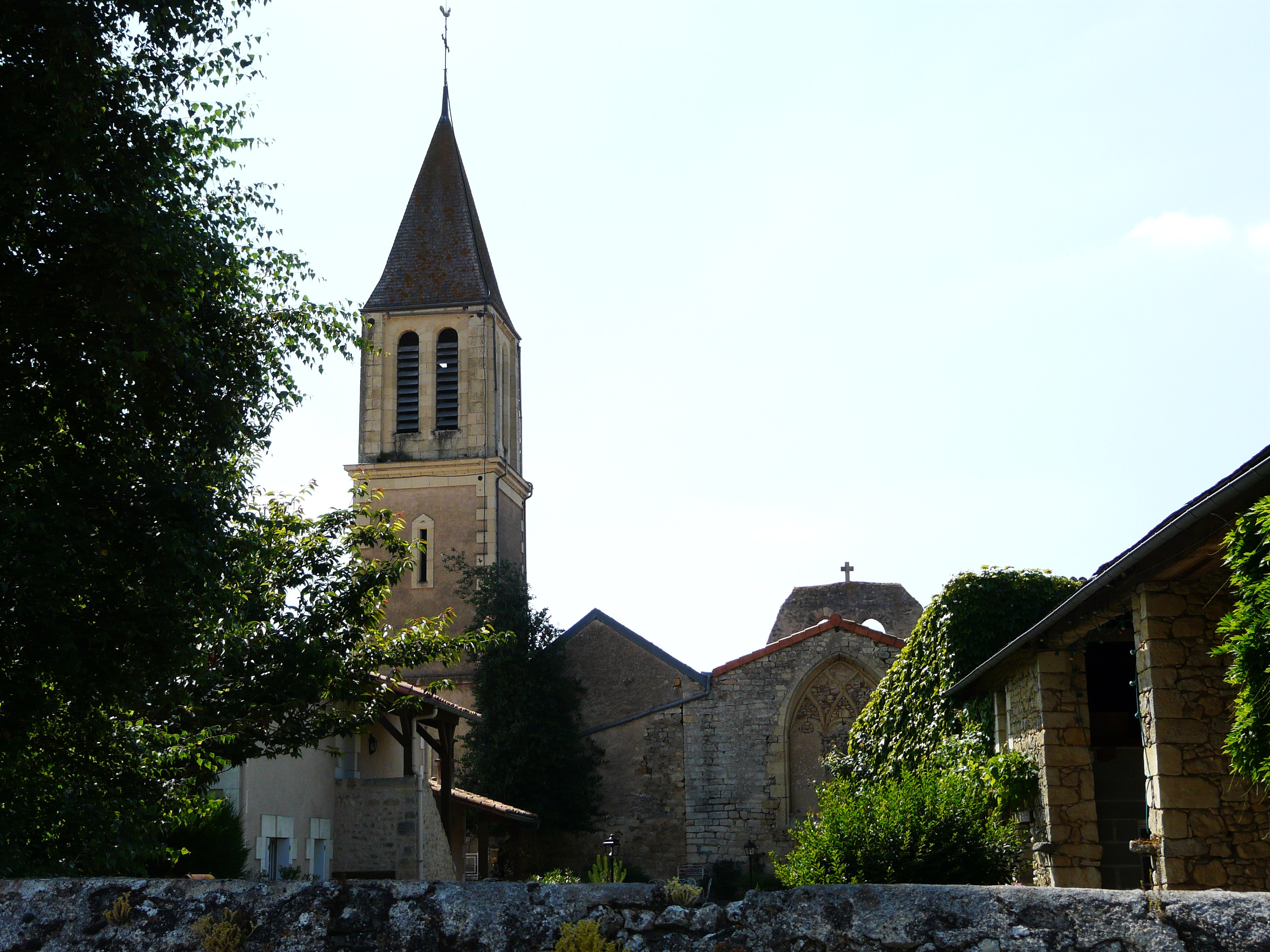
- The church in Missé
- Location of Missé
- Location within France Location within Nouvelle-Aquitaine
- Coordinates: 46°56′58″N 0°11′27″W
- Country: France
- Region: Nouvelle-Aquitaine
- Department: Deux-Sèvres
- Arrondissement: Bressuire
- Canton: Thouars
- Commune: Thouars
- Area^{1}: 12.34 km^{2} (4.76 sq mi)
- Elevation: 106 m (348 ft)
- Highest elevation: 117 m (384 ft)
- Lowest elevation: 47 m (154 ft)
- Population (2022): 849
  - Density: 68.8/km^{2} (178/sq mi)
- Time zone: UTC+01:00 (CET)
  - Summer (DST): UTC+02:00 (CEST)
- Postal code: 79100
- ^{1} French Land Register data, which excludes lakes, ponds, glaciers > 1 km^{2} (0.386 sq mi or 247 acres) and river estuaries.

Missé (French pronunciation: [mise]) is a former commune in the Deux-Sèvres department in western France. On 1 January 2019, it was merged into the commune Thouars.

It is situated on the river Thouet some 5 km upstream from the town of Thouars, and is the site of a spectacular loop in the river.

== See also ==
- Communes of the Deux-Sèvres department
