= Deux-Sèvres's 3rd constituency =

Constituency of the National Assembly of France

3rd constituency of Deux-Sèvres
- inline Constituency of the National Assembly of France

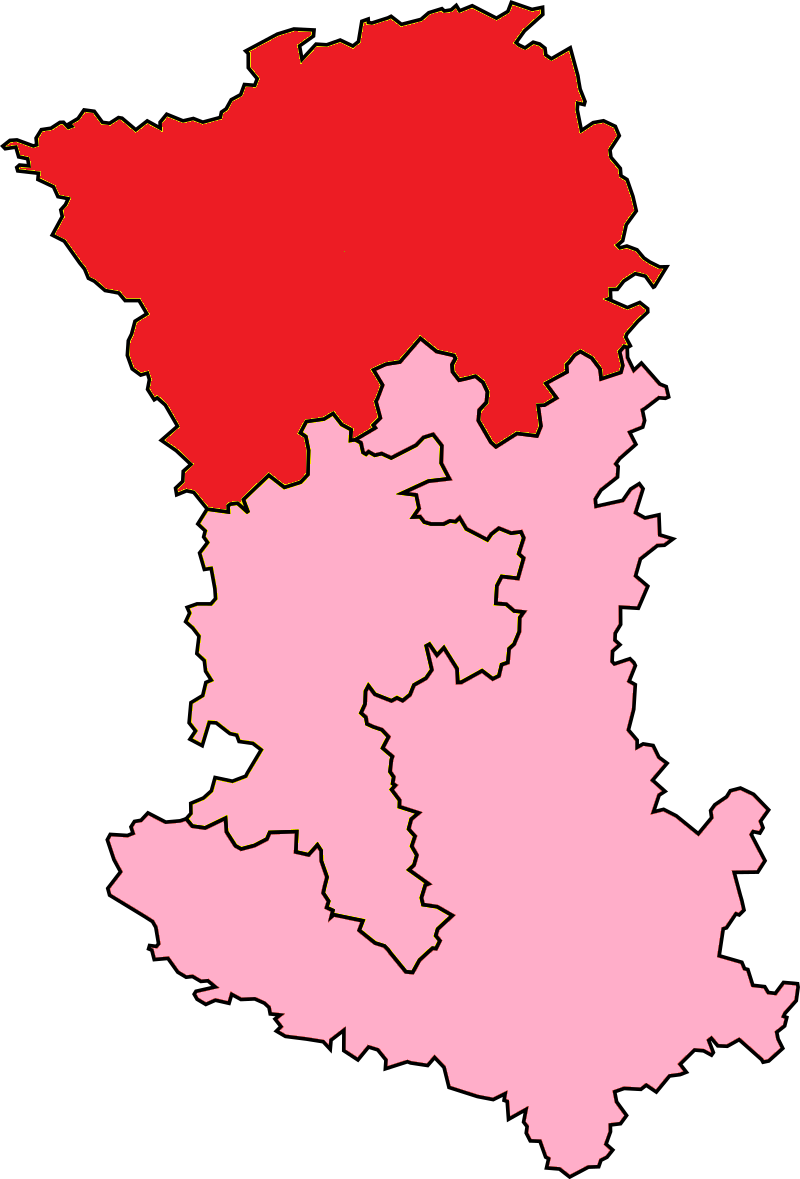
- Deux-Sèvres's 3rd Constituency shown within Deux-Sèvres
- Deputy: Jean-Marie Fiévet; RE
- Department: Deux-Sèvres
- Cantons: Airvault, Argenton-Château, Bressuire, Cerizay, Mauléon, Moncoutant, Saint-Loup-Lamairé, Saint-Varent, Thouars I, Thouars II
- Registered voters: 84788

The 3rd constituency of Deux-Sèvres (French: Troisième circonscription des Deux-Sèvres) is a French legislative constituency in the Deux-Sèvres département. Like the other 576 French constituencies, it elects one MP using a two round electoral system.

== Description ==
The 3rd Constituency of Deux-Sèvres covers the northern portion of the Department including the small town of Thouars.

Politically the seat has traditionally leaned to the right, however in 2017 it swung heavily to En Marche!. Amongst its previous representatives was Jean de Gaulle grandson of Charles de Gaulle.

== Deputies ==
| Election | Member | Party |
|---|---|---|
| 1958 | Jean Salliard du Rivault | CNIP |
| 1962 | Augustin Bordage | UNR |
| 1967 | Augustin Bordage | UDR |
| 1968 | Augustin Bordage | UDR |
| 1973 | Albert Brochard | MR |
| 1978 | Albert Brochard | UDF |
| 1981 | Albert Brochard | UDF |
| 1986 | Proportional representation - no election by constituency | |
| 1988 | Jean de Gaulle | RPR |
| 1993 | Jean-Marie Morisset | UDF |
| 1997 | Jean-Marie Morisset | UDF |
| 2002 | Jean-Marie Morisset | UMP |
| 2007 | Jean-Marie Morisset | UMP |
| 2012 | Jean Grellier | PS |
| 2017 | Jean-Marie Fiévet | LREM |
| 2022 | Jean-Marie Fiévet | RE |

== Election results ==
=== 2024 ===
Legislative Election 2024: Deux-Sèvres's 3rd constituency
| Party | Candidate | Votes | % | ±% |
|---|---|---|---|---|
| LR | Mattieu Manceau | 7,491 | 13.48 | −2.10 |
| DIV | Jacky Durand | 0 | 0.00 | N/A |
| RE (Ensemble) | Jean-Marie Fievet | 17,310 | 31.14 | −3.13 |
| LR (UXD) | Philippe Robin | 19,585 | 35.23 | +15.72 |
| LO | Maryse Vallée | 665 | 1.20 | −0.34 |
| LFI (NFP) | Juliette Woillez | 10,533 | 18.95 | −3.42 |
| Turnout | | 55,584 | 95.94 | +47.93 |
| Registered electors | | 85,314 | | |
2nd round result
| RE | Jean-Marie Fiévet | 31,821 | 58.11 | −0.16 |
| LR | Philippe Robin | 22,936 | 41.89 | N/A |
| Turnout | | 54,757 | 94.37 | +48.69 |
| Registered electors | | 85,329 | | |
| RE hold | | Swing | | |

=== 2022 ===
Legislative Election 2022: Deux-Sèvres's 3rd constituency
| Party | Candidate | Votes | % | ±% |
|---|---|---|---|---|
| LREM (Ensemble) | Jean-Marie Fiévet | 13,507 | 34.27 | -5.91 |
| LFI (NUPÉS) | Juliette Woillez | 8,816 | 22.37 | -2.85 |
| RN | Olivier Guibert | 7,689 | 19.51 | +8.62 |
| LR (UDC) | Philippe Robin | 6,139 | 15.58 | −3.50 |
| REC | Gerard Faivre | 1,345 | 3.41 | N/A |
| DIV | Alexis Barbot | 1,311 | 3.33 | N/A |
| LO | Maryse Vallée | 605 | 1.54 | +0.79 |
| Turnout | | 39,412 | 48.01 | −0.99 |
2nd round result
| LREM (Ensemble) | Jean-Marie Fiévet | 20,675 | 58.27 | -1.10 |
| LFI (NUPÉS) | Juliette Woillez | 14,806 | 41.73 | N/A |
| Turnout | | 35,481 | 45.68 | +7.07 |
| LREM hold | | | | |

=== 2017 ===
Legislative Election 2017: Deux-Sèvres's 3rd constituency
| Party | Candidate | Votes | % | ±% |
|---|---|---|---|---|
| LREM | Jean-Marie Fiévet | 16,692 | 40.18 | N/A |
| LR | Véronique Schaaf-Gauthier | 7,928 | 19.08 | −14.70 |
| PS | Marc Bonneau | 4,864 | 11.71 | −36.09 |
| FN | Lucie Chaumeron | 4,525 | 10.89 | +3.48 |
| LFI | Philippe Cochard | 4,175 | 10.05 | N/A |
| EELV | Armelle Boivin | 1,438 | 3.46 | +1.28 |
| DLF | Marie Poujade | 845 | 2.03 | N/A |
| Others | N/A | 1,078 | | |
| Turnout | | 41,545 | 49.00 | −9.91 |
2nd round result
| LREM | Jean-Marie Fiévet | 19,434 | 59.37 | N/A |
| LR | Véronique Schaaf-Gauthier | 13,300 | 40.63 | −1.59 |
| Turnout | | 32,734 | 38.61 | −18.63 |
| LREM gain from PS | | | | |

=== 2012 ===
Legislative Election 2012: Deux-Sèvres's 3rd constituency
| Party | Candidate | Votes | % | ±% |
|---|---|---|---|---|
| PS | Jean Grellier | 23,966 | 47.80 | |
| UMP | Philippe Mouiller | 16,940 | 33.78 | |
| FN | Jean-Romée Charbonneau | 3,714 | 7.41 | |
| PCF | Thibaut Lalu | 1,600 | 3.19 | |
| MoDem | Pierre Bureau | 1,194 | 2.38 | |
| EELV | Cyril Pouclet | 1,091 | 2.18 | |
| Others | N/A | 1,636 | | |
| Turnout | | 50,141 | 58.91 | |
2nd round result
| PS | Jean Grellier | 28,148 | 57.78 | |
| UMP | Philippe Mouiller | 20,565 | 42.22 | |
| Turnout | | 48,713 | 57.24 | |
| PS gain from UMP | | | | |

=== 2007 ===
Legislative Election 2007: Deux-Sèvres's 3rd constituency
| Party | Candidate | Votes | % | ±% |
|---|---|---|---|---|
| UMP | Jean-Marie Morisset | 22,143 | 55.66 | |
| PS | Gaëtan Fort | 10,787 | 27.11 | |
| MoDem | Michel Clairand | 2,025 | 5.09 | |
| LV | Chantal Mathieu | 1,263 | 3.17 | |
| DIV | Benoît Michenot | 852 | 2.14 | |
| FN | Sylvie Albert | 815 | 2.05 | |
| Others | N/A | 1,900 | | |
| Turnout | | 40,724 | 65.95 | |
| UMP hold | | | | |

=== 2002 ===
Legislative Election 2002: Deux-Sèvres's 3rd constituency
| Party | Candidate | Votes | % | ±% |
|---|---|---|---|---|
| UMP | Jean-Marie Morisset | 24,675 | 59.54 | |
| PS | Gaëtan Fort | 9,449 | 22.80 | |
| FN | Colette Messein | 1,928 | 4.65 | |
| LV | Didier Coupeau | 1,860 | 4.49 | |
| PCF | Daniel Fasanino | 997 | 2.41 | |
| CPNT | Mireille Roy | 861 | 2.08 | |
| Others | N/A | 1,671 | | |
| Turnout | | 42,443 | 69.07 | |
| UMP hold | | | | |

=== 1997 ===
Legislative Election 1997: Deux-Sèvres's 3rd constituency
| Party | Candidate | Votes | % | ±% |
|---|---|---|---|---|
| UDF | Jean-Marie Morisset | 20,353 | 48.61 | |
| PS | Gaëtan Fort | 11,617 | 27.74 | |
| FN | Colette Messein | 2,999 | 7.16 | |
| LV | Jean-François Pradeau | 2,347 | 5.61 | |
| DVD | Henri Herren | 1,679 | 4.01 | |
| PCF | Daniel Fasanino | 1,615 | 3.86 | |
| MRC | Gérard Penit | 1,262 | 3.01 | |
| Turnout | | 45,000 | 74.04 | |
2nd round result
| UDF | Jean-Marie Morisset | 24,698 | 58.61 | |
| PS | Gaëtan Fort | 17,438 | 41.39 | |
| Turnout | | 44,622 | 73.43 | |
| UDF hold | | | | |
