= Cantons of Niort =

Coordinates: 46.32°N 0.46°W

The cantons of Niort are administrative divisions of the Deux-Sèvres department, in western France. Since the French canton reorganisation which came into effect in March 2015, the city of Niort is subdivided into 3 cantons. Their seat is in Niort.

== Population ==
Name	Population (2019)	Cantonal Code
Canton of Niort-1	20,217	7910
Canton of Niort-2	19,041	7911
Canton of Niort-3	19,935	7912
