= Jean Grellier =

French politician

Jean Grellier (born 17 May 1947 in Moncoutant) was a member of the National Assembly of France. He represented Deux-Sèvres's 4th constituency from 2007 to 2012 and Deux-Sèvres's 3rd constituency from 2012 to 2017, as a member of the Socialiste, radical, citoyen et divers gauche.
