= Arrondissements of the Deux-Sèvres department =

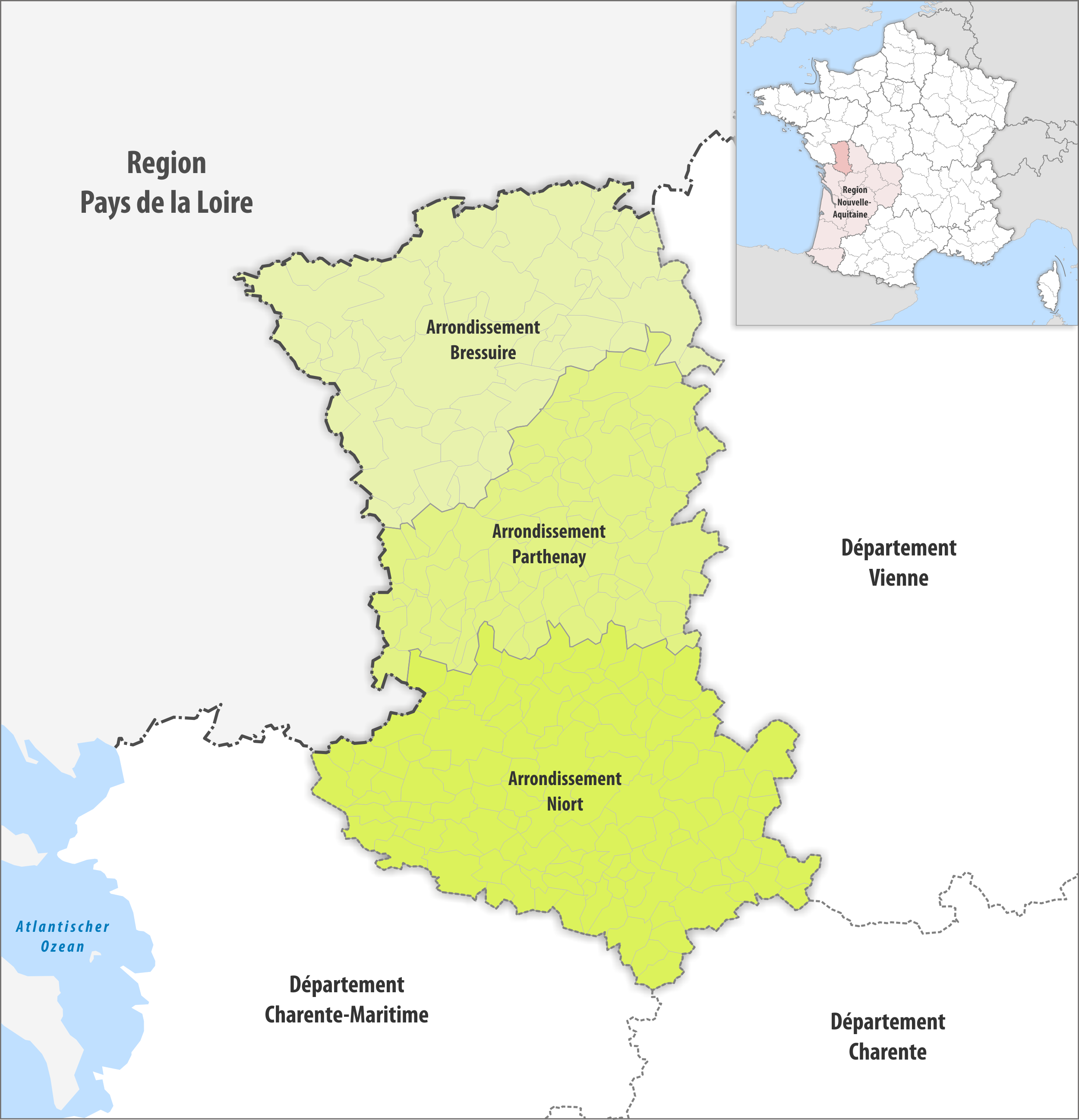
Map of arrondissements of the Deux-Sèvres department.

The 3 arrondissements of the Deux-Sèvres department are:

1. Arrondissement of Bressuire, (subprefecture: Bressuire) with 57 communes. The population of the arrondissement was 109,621 in 2021.
2. Arrondissement of Niort, (prefecture of the Deux-Sèvres department: Niort) with 121 communes. The population of the arrondissement was 199,565 in 2021.
3. Arrondissement of Parthenay, (subprefecture: Parthenay) with 78 communes. The population of the arrondissement was 65,401 in 2021.

== History ==
In 1800 the arrondissements of Niort, Melle, Parthenay and Thouars were established. In 1804 Bressuire replaced Thouars as subprefecture. The arrondissements of Bressuire and Melle were disbanded in 1926, and Bressuire was restored in 1942.

The borders of the arrondissements of Deux-Sèvres were modified in January 2018:

- 21 communes from the arrondissement of Niort to the arrondissement of Parthenay
- 16 communes from the arrondissement of Parthenay to the arrondissement of Bressuire
- 11 communes from the arrondissement of Bressuire to the arrondissement of Niort
