= Margaret Stewart, Dauphine of France =

Margaret of Scotland
- Dauphine of France
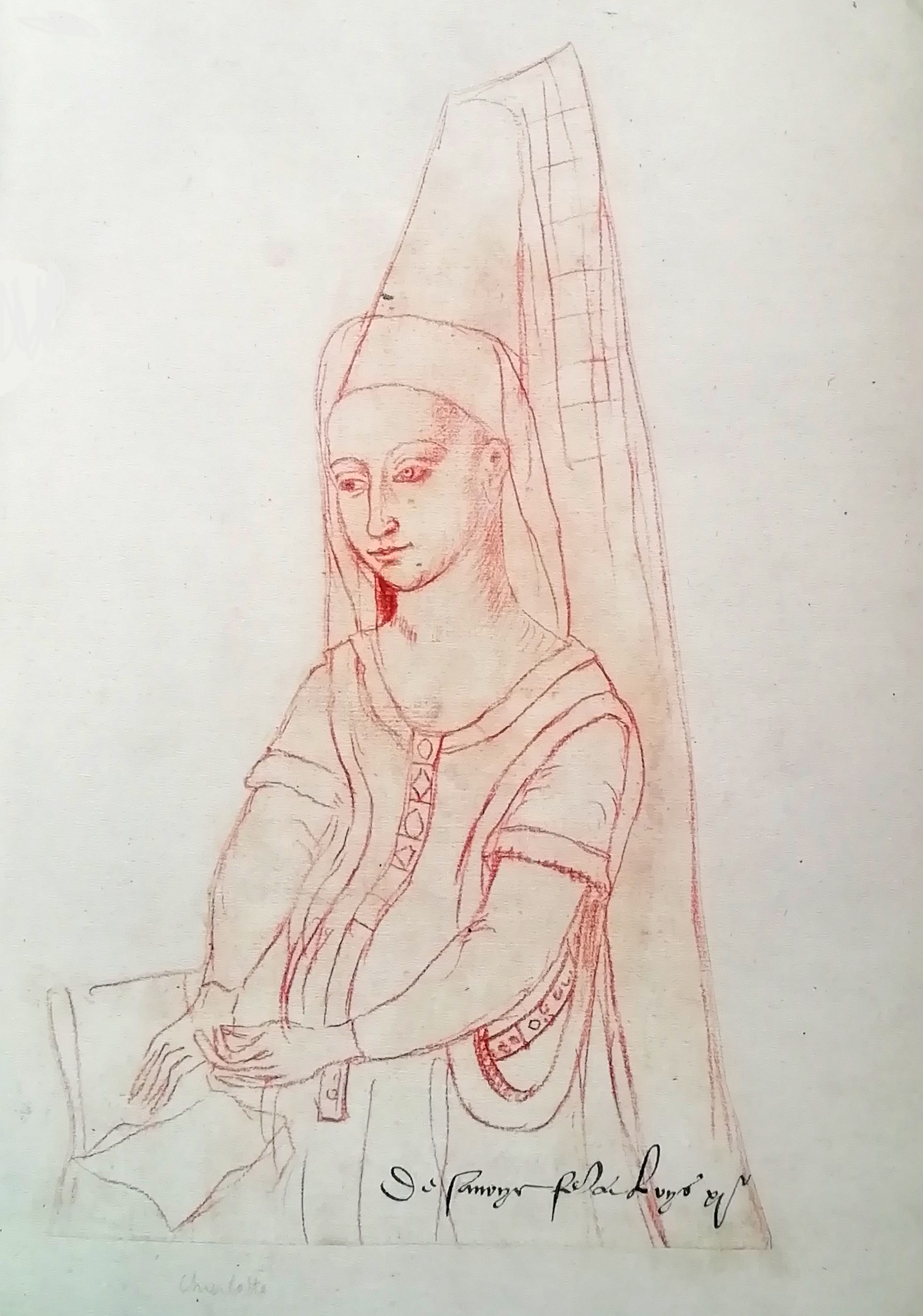
- Born: 25 December 1424; Perth, Scotland
- Died: 16 August 1445 (aged 20); Châlons-sur-Marne, France
- Burial: Saint-Laon church, Thouars, France
- Spouse: Louis, Dauphin of France (m. 1436) (Later Louis XI)
- House: Stewart
- Father: James I, King of Scots
- Mother: Joan Beaufort

Margaret Stewart (French: Marguerite; 25 December 1424 – 16 August 1445) was a princess of Scotland and the dauphine of France. She was the firstborn child of King James I of Scotland and Joan Beaufort.

She married the eldest son of the king of France, Louis, Dauphin of France, at the age of eleven. Their marriage was unhappy, and she died childless at the age of 20, apparently of a fever.

== Early life ==
Margaret was born in Perth, Scotland, to James I of Scotland and Joan Beaufort, a cousin of Henry V of England. Margaret was the first of six daughters and twin sons born to her parents. Her surviving brother James would become James II of Scotland at the age of six.

== Dauphine of France ==
Margaret was Charles VII of France's diplomatic choice for daughter-in-law. The marriage was forced upon Charles's twelve-year-old son, Louis, which did not help their relationship.

Margaret sailed from Dumbarton with a 140-strong household in royal livery, 1,200 men at arms, and an escort of Scottish lords led by William Sinclair, 3rd Earl of Orkney and 1st Earl of Caithness. The party arrived at La Rochelle on 15 April 1436, travelling on to Tours via Poitiers.

There are no direct accounts from Louis or Margaret of their first impressions of each other, and it is mere speculation to say whether or not they actually had negative feelings for each other. Several historians think that Louis had a predetermined attitude to hate his wife because she was his father's choice of bride. But it is universally agreed that Louis entered the ceremony and the marriage itself dutifully, as evidenced by his formal embrace of Margaret upon their first meeting on 24 June 1436, the day before their wedding.

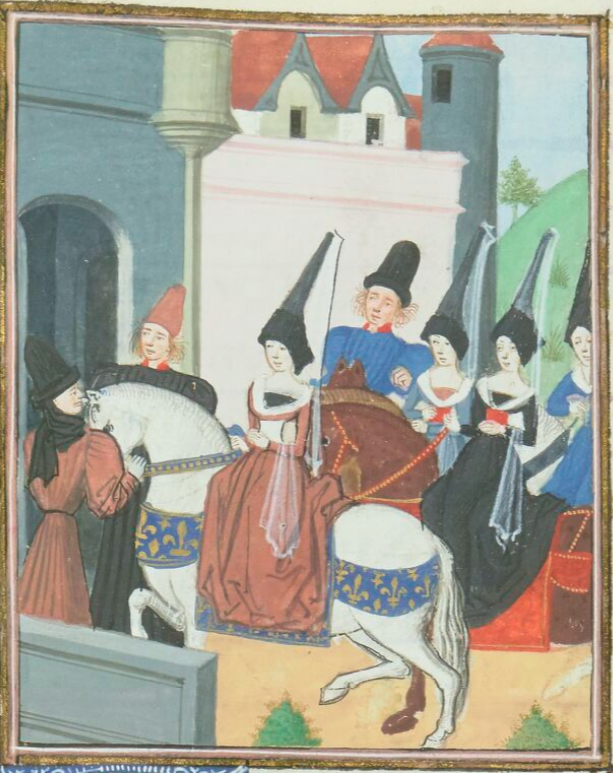
Margaret arrives in Tours for her wedding, from a 15th-century work by Jean Chartier.

Margaret and Louis' marriage shows both the nature of medieval royal diplomacy and the precarious position of the French monarchy. After a papal dispensation was granted due to the age of the bridge and groom, the marriage took place 25 June 1436 in the afternoon in the chapel of the castle of Tours. It was presided over by the Archbishop of Reims. By the standards of the time, it was a very plain wedding. Louis, nearly thirteen, looked clearly more mature than his bride. Margaret looked like a beautiful "doll", perhaps because she was treated as such by her in-laws. Charles wore "grey riding pants" and "did not even bother to remove his spurs". The Scottish guests were quickly hustled out after the wedding reception. This treatment and King Charles' attire were seen as insulting to Scotland, which was an important ally in France's war with England. However, it may have reflected the impoverished state of the French court at this time. Charles may not have been able to afford an extravagant ceremony or to host the substantial contingent of Scottish guests for any longer than he did.

Following the ceremony, "doctors advised against consummation" because of the relative immaturity of the bride and bridegroom. Margaret was considered lovely, gracious and very beautiful, with a certain ability to write poetry and rhymes, though no example of her compositions survived destruction at her husband's hands after her death. She was active in the French court's social and gallant life and popular with courtiers. She was part of a literary coterie that encompassed female members of the royal family, related noblewomen, ladies-in-waiting and the administrators who served them. Margaret was at Tours in March 1444 for the betrothal by proxy of Margaret of Anjou to Henry VI of England and she was a companion of Isabella of Portugal, Duchess of Burgundy, during the latter's residence at the French court.

Margaret was a favourite of her father-in-law Charles VII of France and had a good relationship with his queen Marie d'Anjou, but her relationship with her husband, the future king of France, was strained, mainly because of Louis' hatred of his father. Charles VII had ordered the marriage, and Margaret frequently supported the king against her husband. She was put under surveillance by the dauphin's Breton chamberlain, Jamet de Tillay, who accused her of socialising inappropriately with young male courtiers. It was also rumoured that Margaret wore a strongly-tied corset, ate green apples and drank apple vinegar with the aim of avoiding becoming pregnant.

== Death ==
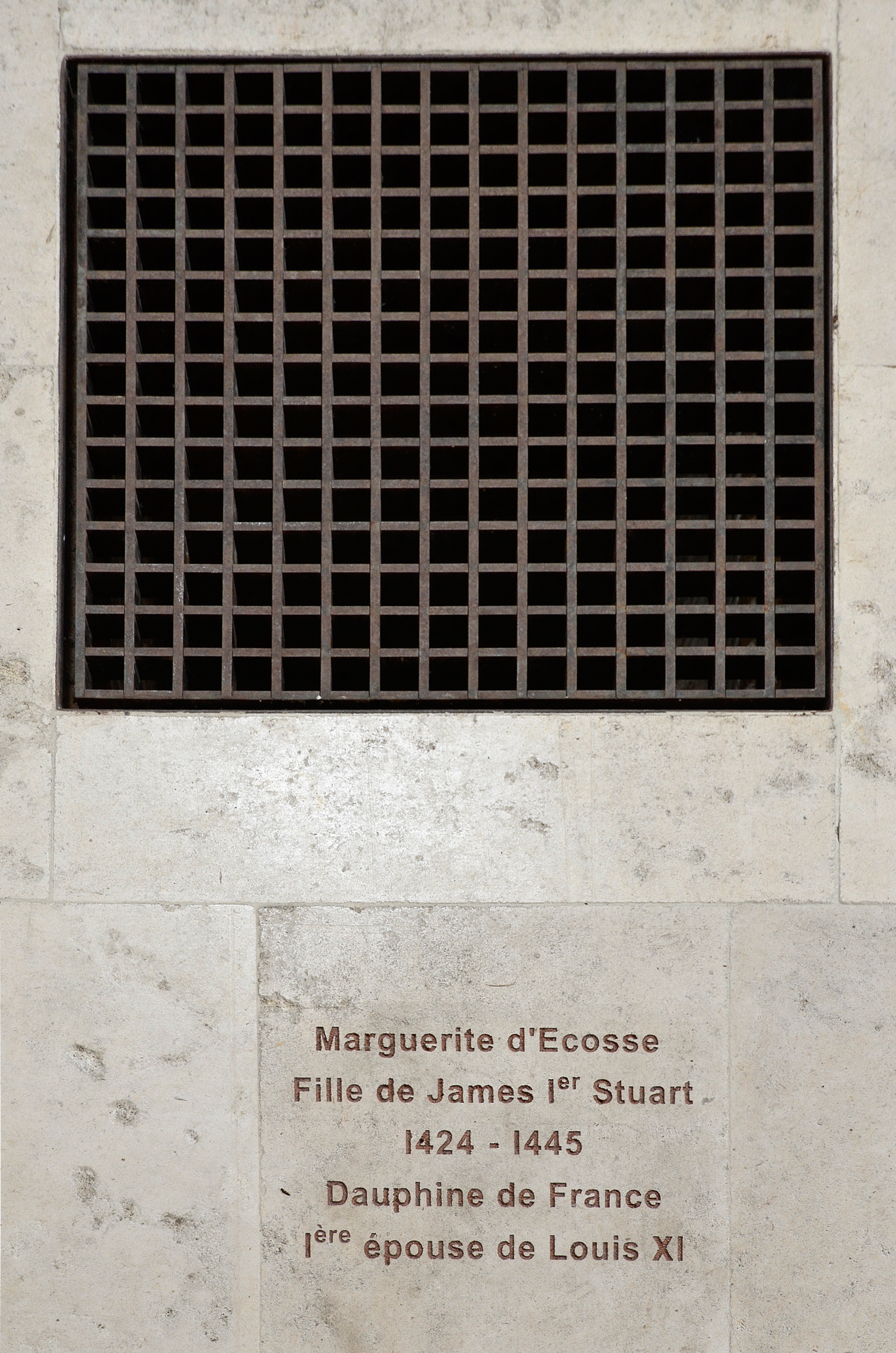
Tomb of Margaret Stewart in the Saint-Laon Church, Thouars.

On 16 August 1445, between ten and eleven at night, Margaret died in Châlons-sur-Marne, Marne, France at the age of 20. On Saturday, 7 August, she and her ladies had joined the court on a short pilgrimage. It was very hot, and when she returned, she undressed in her stone chamber. The next morning she was feverish, the doctor diagnosed the inflammation of the lungs. On her deathbed she is alleged to have railed against the calumnies of Jamet de Tillay and protested her faithfulness to her husband.

She was buried in the Saint-Laon Church in Thouars, in the Deux-Sèvres department of France.

Margaret is also famous for the legend that she was kissed or almost kissed by poet Alain Chartier while asleep in her own rooms (another variant of this legend has Anne of Brittany as its protagonist), though her age and location at the time of Chartier's death would have made that impossible.

== Sources ==
- Dean, Lucinda H S (2024). Death and the Royal Succession in Scotland, C.1214-C.1543: Ritual, Ceremony and Power. Boydell Press. ISBN 978-1837651726.
- Ruth Putnam, Charles the Bold
- Kendall, P.M. (1971). Louis XI: The Universal Spider. W.W. Norton & Company Inc.
- Tyrell, Joseph M. (1980). Louis XI. Twayne Publishers. ISBN 978-0-8057-7728-4.
