= Mauzé-Thouarsais =

- Part of Thouars
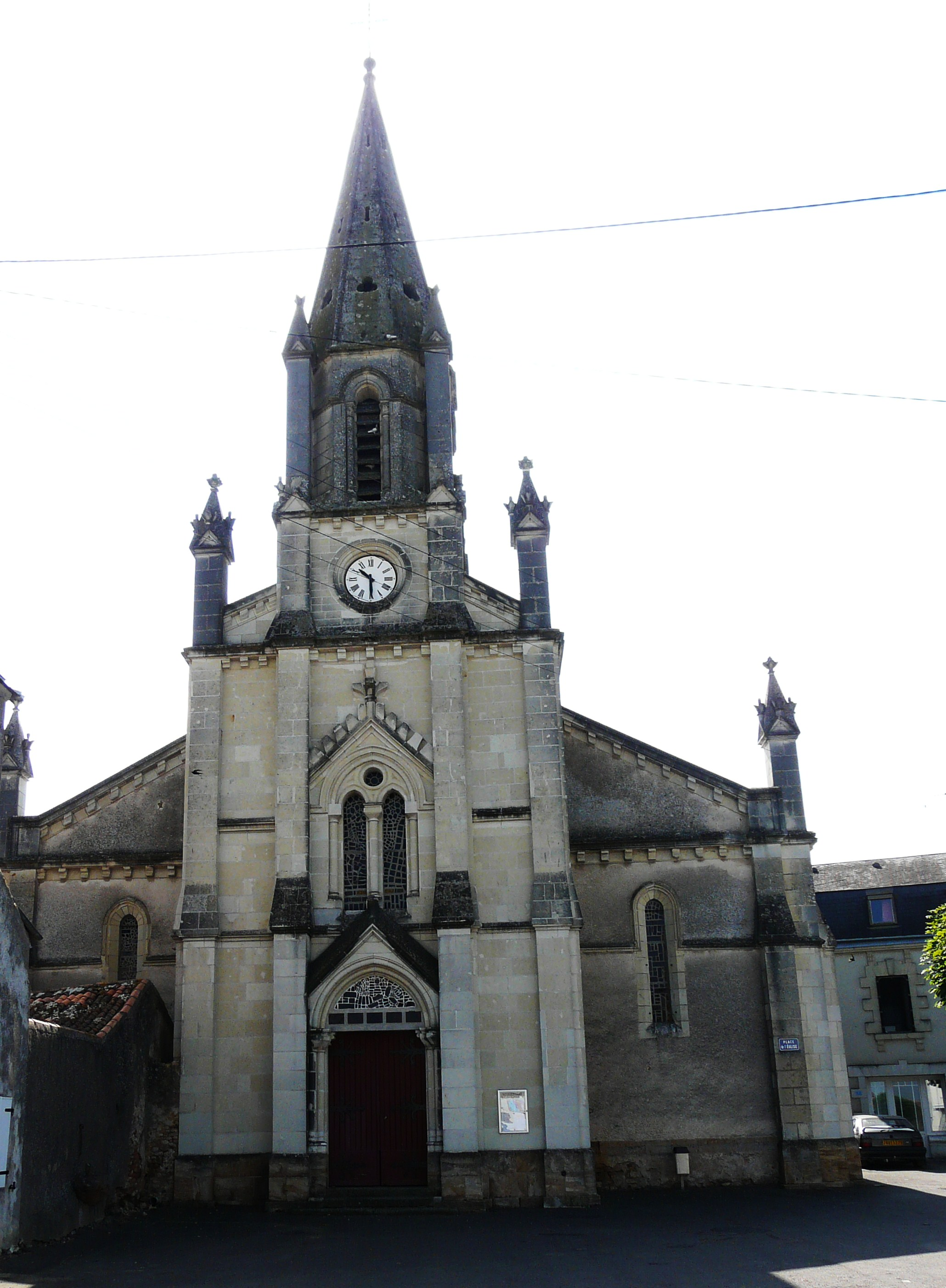
- The church in Mauzé-Thouarsais
- Location of Mauzé-Thouarsais
- Location within France Location within Nouvelle-Aquitaine
- Coordinates: 46°58′41″N 0°16′33″W
- Country: France
- Region: Nouvelle-Aquitaine
- Department: Deux-Sèvres
- Arrondissement: Bressuire
- Canton: Thouars
- Commune: Thouars
- Area^{1}: 49.53 km^{2} (19.12 sq mi)
- Elevation: 106 m (348 ft)
- Highest elevation: 120 m (390 ft)
- Lowest elevation: 49 m (161 ft)
- Population (2022): 2,120
  - Density: 42.8/km^{2} (111/sq mi)
- Time zone: UTC+01:00 (CET)
  - Summer (DST): UTC+02:00 (CEST)
- Postal code: 79100
- ^{1} French Land Register data, which excludes lakes, ponds, glaciers > 1 km^{2} (0.386 sq mi or 247 acres) and river estuaries.

Mauzé-Thouarsais (French pronunciation: [moze twaʁsɛ]) is a former commune in the Deux-Sèvres department in western France. In January 1973 it absorbed the former commune Rigné. On 1 January 2019, it was merged into the commune Thouars.

== See also ==
- Communes of the Deux-Sèvres department
