= Jean-Marie Fiévet =

French politician

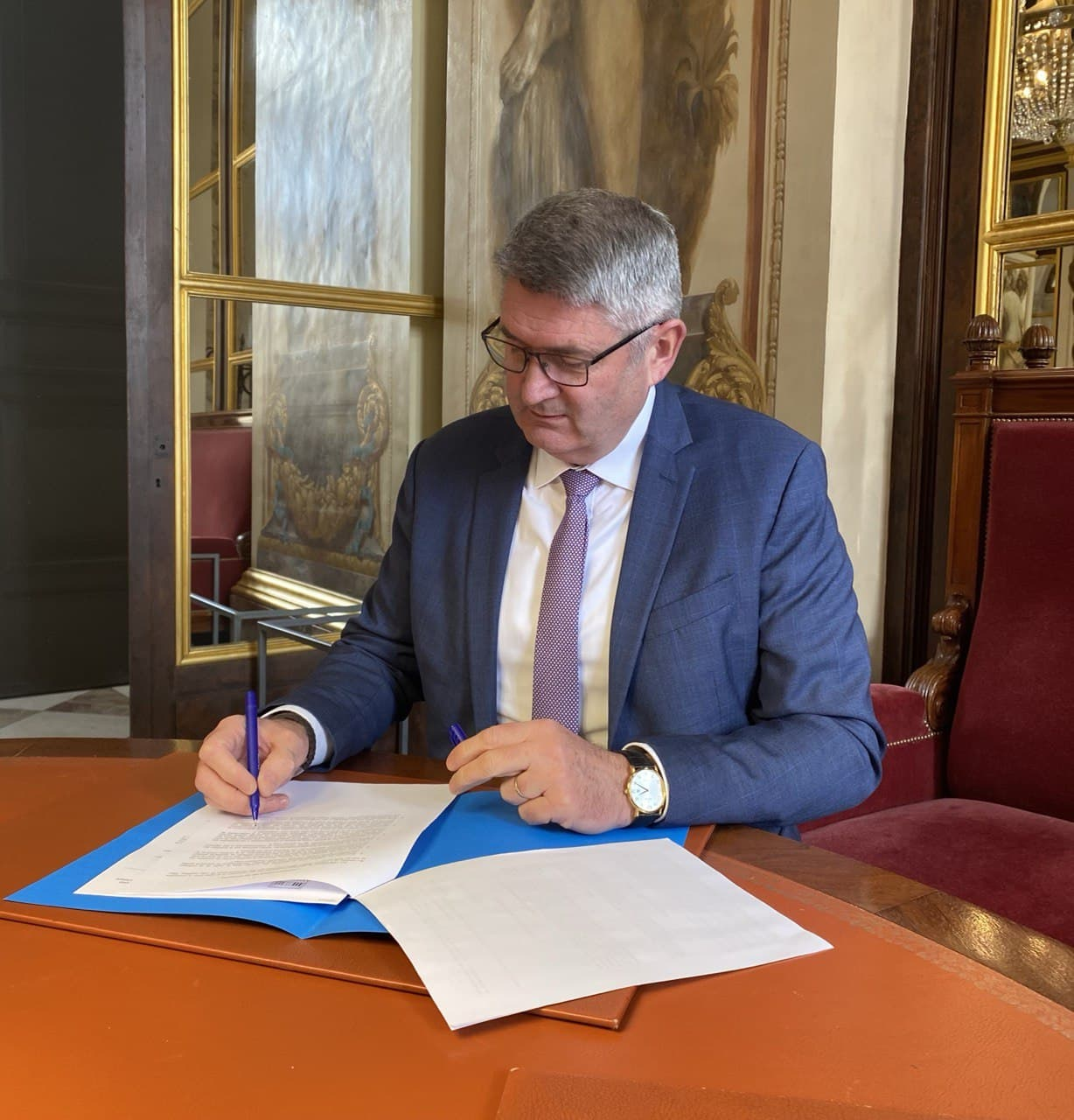
Jean-Marie Fiévet

Jean-Marie Fiévet (born 19 June 1964 in Bressuire) is a French politician representing La République En Marche! He was elected to the French National Assembly on 18 June 2017, representing the 3rd constituency of Deux-Sèvres. He is a professional fireman, lieutenant.

== See also ==
- 2017 French legislative election
