= Thouars =

- Commune
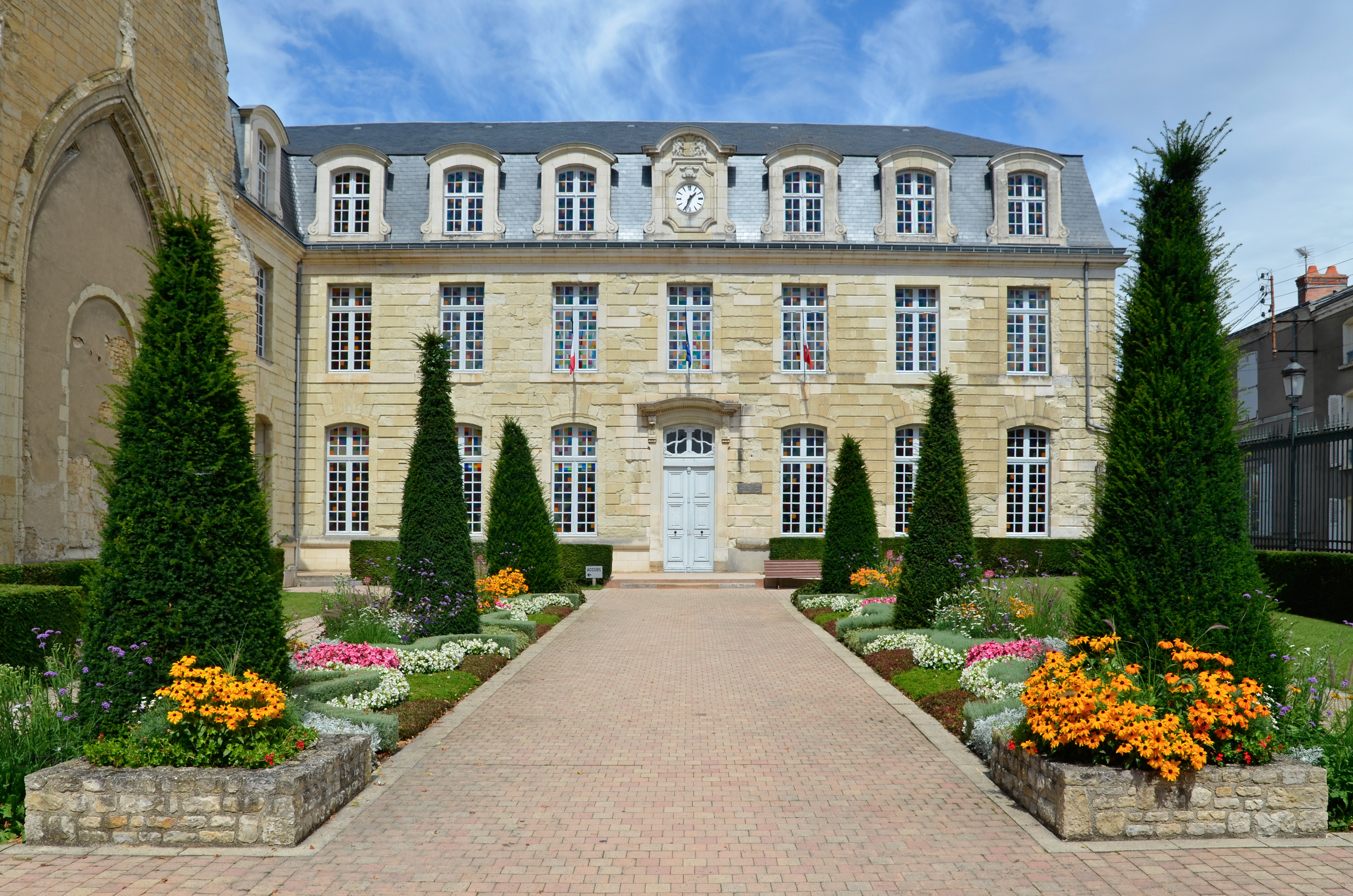
- The town hall in Thouars

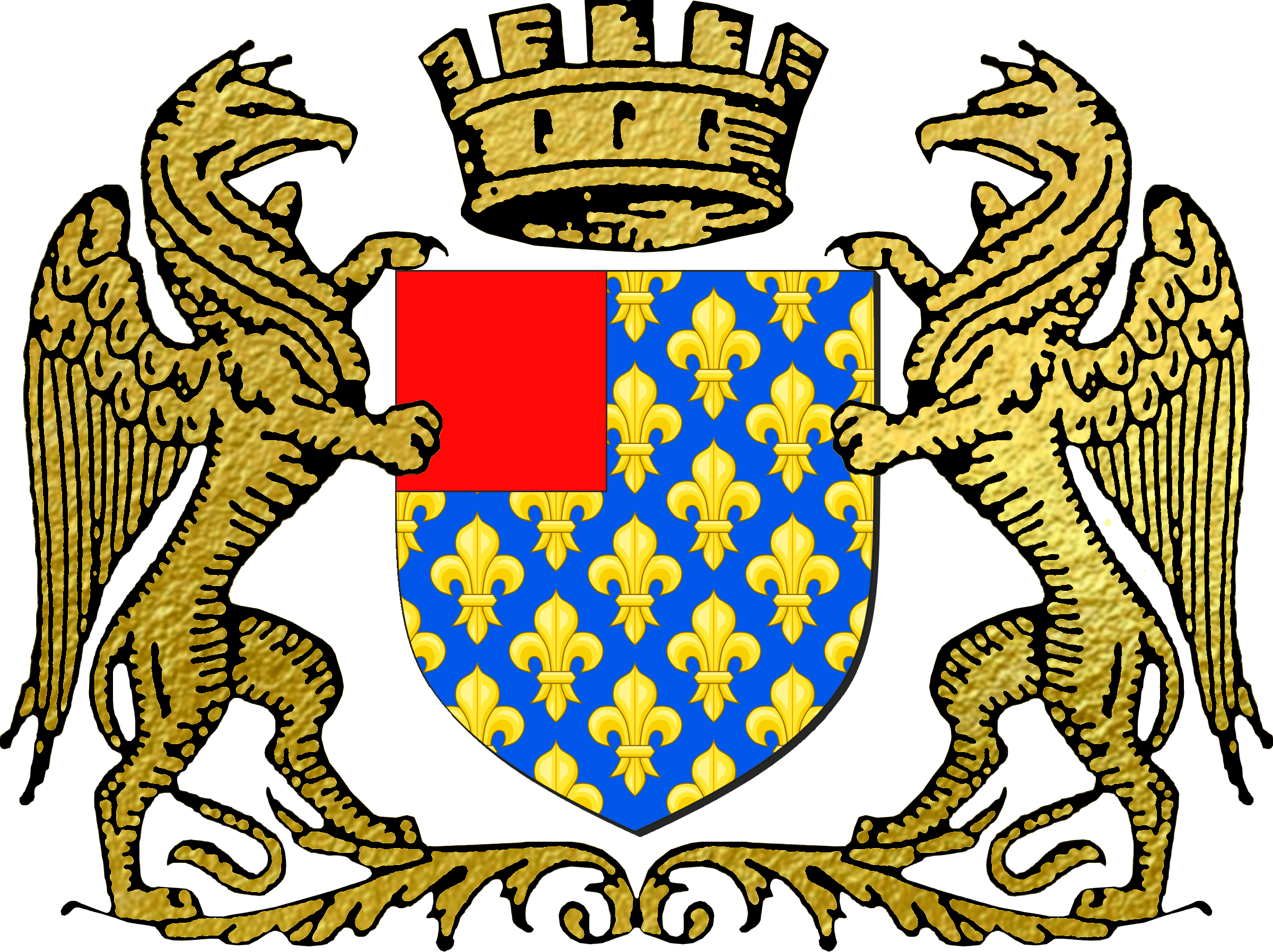
- Coat of arms
- Location of Thouars
- Location within France Location within Nouvelle-Aquitaine
- Coordinates: 46°58′33″N 0°12′51″W
- Country: France
- Region: Nouvelle-Aquitaine
- Department: Deux-Sèvres
- Arrondissement: Bressuire
- Canton: Thouars
- Intercommunality: Thouarsais

Government
  - Mayor (2020–2026): Bernard Paineau
- Area^{1}: 81.48 km^{2} (31.46 sq mi)
- Elevation: 100 m (330 ft)
- Highest elevation: 117 m (384 ft)
- Lowest elevation: 47 m (154 ft)
- Population (2023): 13,891
  - Density: 170.5/km^{2} (441.6/sq mi)
- Time zone: UTC+01:00 (CET)
  - Summer (DST): UTC+02:00 (CEST)
- INSEE/Postal code: 79329 /79100
- ^{1} French Land Register data, which excludes lakes, ponds, glaciers > 1 km^{2} (0.386 sq mi or 247 acres) and river estuaries.

Thouars (French: [twaʁ]) is a commune in the Deux-Sèvres department in western France. On 1 January 2019, the former communes Mauzé-Thouarsais, Missé and Sainte-Radegonde were merged into Thouars.

It is on the River Thouet. Its inhabitants are known as Thouarsais. The Toarcian stage of the Jurassic takes its name from the town.

== History ==
Although there is evidence of human habitation here 5,000 years ago, it is only in the seventh century that the town appears in the historical record. In the 760s, Thouars found itself in Aquitaine, the most robust fortress in the entire region according to contemporary chroniclers. This was a violent decade as Duke Waïfre, struggling to preserve the independence of Aquitaine, fought against the expansionist ambitions of the French King, Pepin the Short. In 762, accompanied by his son, the future Charlemagne, appeared outside Thouars. He destroyed the Gallo-Roman town and torched the castle.

Arms of the Viscounts of Thouars

In the ninth century the first of a line of viscounts took charge of Thouars: he and his successors would control the fiefdom for more than five centuries until the end of the fourteenth century. The earliest of these Viscounts of Thouars for whom information survives is Geoffrey I, known as the founder of the Thouars dynasty. Located at the south of Anjou and at the frontier with Aquitaine, the Viscountcy of Thouars became a rich fiefdom with a strategic location extending from Upper Poitou all the way to the coast.

Aimery IV of Thouars was a companion of William the Conqueror as a commander in the Battle of Hastings.

In Angers in 1199, Guy of Thouars married Constance of Brittany to become Duke of Brittany jure uxoris, and after the death of Constance, Regent of Brittany for her daughter Alix of Thouars. In 1372 the English were expelled from the town by Bertrand du Guesclin.

Thouars was the birthplace of the medieval general Louis de La Trémoille, created duke by Charles IX in 1563. In 1619 his heir Henri de La Trémoille married Marie de la Tour d'Auvergne, sister of Turenne. She razed the old gothic château-fort to build the present château.

== Population ==
Populations of the area corresponding with the commune of Thouars at 1 January 2025.

Historical population
Year	Pop.	±% p.a.
1968	15,139	—
1975	16,063	+0.85%
1982	15,935	−0.11%
1990	15,657	−0.22%
1999	15,498	−0.11%
2007	14,797	−0.58%
2012	14,385	−0.56%
2017	13,990	−0.56%
2023	13,891	−0.12%
Source: INSEE

== Main sights ==
- The castle of the Dukes of La Trémoille, designed by Jacques Lemercier and completed in 1635–1638. Its main façade is more than 110 m tall. After the Trémouilles were dispossessed during the French Revolution, the château became a barracks and later a prison. It has been restored for its present use as a middle school.
- Walls, with several historical towers (Tour du Prince-de-Galles, Tour Porte au Prévost) dating from the 13th century; a bridge of the same period crosses the Thouet.
- Church of Saint-Laon (12th century), subsequently attached to an abbey, whose buildings later became a town hall. The church houses the tomb of Margaret Stewart, first wife of King Louis XI of France.
- Church of St. Medard (15th century), in Romanesque style
- The Neo-Gothic Chapel of Joan of Arc
- Henri-Barré museum

== People ==
Thouars was the birthplace of:

- Louis II de La Trémoille (1460–1525), general
- Charlotte Stanley, Countess of Derby (1599–1664)
- Prosper Depredomme (1918–1997), cyclist
- Jean-Hugues Anglade (born 1955), actor

It is associated with:

- Emilie von Hessen-Kassel (1626–1693), Duchess of Thouars from 1648

Thouars is also the final resting place of:

- Margaret Stewart, Dauphine of France (1424–1445), daughter of James I of Scotland.

== Twin towns ==
Thouars is twinned with:

- Hannut, Belgium
- Port-Gentil, Gabon
- Diepholz, Germany
- Międzyrzec Podlaski, Poland
- Dumbarton, Scotland, United Kingdom

== Climate ==
Climate data for Thouars (1991–2020 normals, extremes 1975–present)
Month	Jan	Feb	Mar	Apr	May	Jun	Jul	Aug	Sep	Oct	Nov	Dec	Year
Record high °C (°F)	16.9 (62.4)	22.3 (72.1)	27.0 (80.6)	31.3 (88.3)	35.1 (95.2)	43.1 (109.6)	41.7 (107.1)	43.0 (109.4)	35.8 (96.4)	31.3 (88.3)	23.1 (73.6)	19.4 (66.9)	43.1 (109.6)
Mean daily maximum °C (°F)	8.9 (48.0)	10.4 (50.7)	14.3 (57.7)	17.5 (63.5)	21.4 (70.5)	25.2 (77.4)	27.5 (81.5)	27.5 (81.5)	23.7 (74.7)	18.2 (64.8)	12.7 (54.9)	9.4 (48.9)	18.1 (64.6)
Daily mean °C (°F)	5.9 (42.6)	6.5 (43.7)	9.3 (48.7)	11.8 (53.2)	15.5 (59.9)	19.0 (66.2)	21.0 (69.8)	21.0 (69.8)	17.6 (63.7)	13.7 (56.7)	9.1 (48.4)	6.3 (43.3)	13.1 (55.6)
Mean daily minimum °C (°F)	2.9 (37.2)	2.5 (36.5)	4.3 (39.7)	6.1 (43.0)	9.7 (49.5)	12.9 (55.2)	14.6 (58.3)	14.5 (58.1)	11.5 (52.7)	9.3 (48.7)	5.6 (42.1)	3.2 (37.8)	8.1 (46.6)
Record low °C (°F)	−14.6 (5.7)	−12.6 (9.3)	−10.7 (12.7)	−3.8 (25.2)	0.4 (32.7)	2.5 (36.5)	5.6 (42.1)	5.1 (41.2)	1.1 (34.0)	−4.6 (23.7)	−8.2 (17.2)	−11.2 (11.8)	−14.6 (5.7)
Average precipitation mm (inches)	51.1 (2.01)	39.2 (1.54)	40.4 (1.59)	46.0 (1.81)	49.7 (1.96)	43.0 (1.69)	38.4 (1.51)	37.8 (1.49)	48.9 (1.93)	65.3 (2.57)	58.7 (2.31)	57.0 (2.24)	575.5 (22.66)
Average precipitation days (≥ 1.0 mm)	10.0	8.4	8.4	8.8	8.8	7.1	6.2	6.2	7.0	9.9	11.0	10.9	102.7
Source: Meteociel

== See also ==
- The Toarcian Age of the Jurassic Period of geological time is named for Thouars
- Communes of the Deux-Sèvres department
- Saint-Laon Church, Thouars
