= Deux-Sèvres =

Department of France

- Department
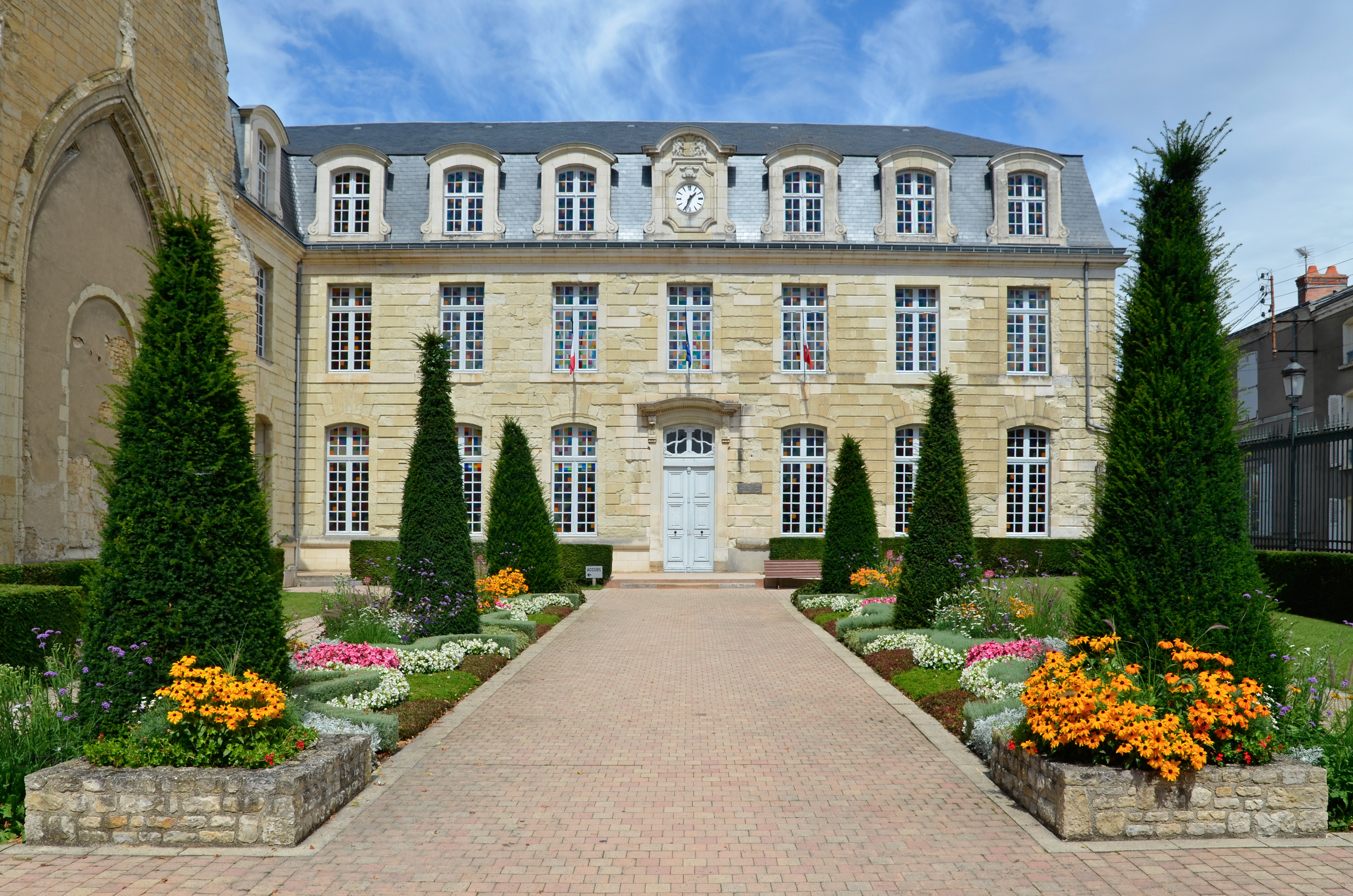
- The town hall of Thouars

- Flag Coat of arms

- Location of Deux-Sèvres in France
- Coordinates: 46°30′N 00°20′E
- Country: France
- Region: Nouvelle-Aquitaine
- Prefecture: Niort
- Subprefectures: Bressuire; Parthenay

Government
  - President of the Departmental Council: Coralie Denoues

Area^{1}
  - Total: 5,999 km^{2} (2,316 sq mi)

Population (2023)
  - Total: 375,229
  - Rank: 63rd
  - Density: 62.55/km^{2} (162.0/sq mi)
- Time zone: UTC+1 (CET)
  - Summer (DST): UTC+2 (CEST)
- Department number: 79
- Arrondissements: 3
- Cantons: 17
- Communes: 252
- ^1 French Land Register data, which exclude estuaries, and lakes, ponds, and glaciers larger than 1 km^{2}

Deux-Sèvres (French pronunciation: [dø sɛvʁ], Poitevin-Saintongese: Deùs Saevres) is a French department. Deux-Sèvres literally means "two Sèvres": the Sèvre Nantaise and the Sèvre Niortaise are two rivers which have their sources in the department. It had a population of 375,229 in 2023.

== In history and literature ==
Deux-Sèvres was one of the 83 original départements created during the French Revolution on 4 March 1790. The land had been part of the ancient province of Poitou.

Departmental borders were changed in 1973 when the inhabitants of the little commune of Puy-Saint-Bonnet became formally associated with the rapidly growing adjacent commune of Cholet, which is in the neighbouring department of Maine-et-Loire. To prevent the associated communes from being administered in separate departments, Puy-Saint-Bonnet was transferred into Maine-et-Loire.

Deux-Sèvres features in Son Excellence Eugene Rougon, a novel by Émile Zola in his Rougon-Macquart series, when Rougon visits Niort, the departmental capital, to open a new rail line to Angers (chapter 10).

== Geography and economics ==
The climate is mild, the annual temperature averaging 11 degrees Celsius.

The département remains rural: three-quarters of the area consists of arable land. Wheat and oats are the main products grown, as well as potatoes, apples, and walnuts. Niort is the center for growing vegetables and angelica. Some beetroot is grown in the district of Melle. Vineyards are numerous in the north (Haut-poitou (AOVDQS)), and there are some in the south.

The département is also well known for the breeding of cattle, mules, and horses. The Parthenais breed of cattle is named after the town of Parthenay in the north of the département. Also, dairy products are produced in significant quantities (butter in Échiré and goats' cheese).

Some quarries are in operation (in Mazières-en-Gâtine, La Peyratte or Saint-Varent), as well as lime extraction operations.

Textiles, leather-tanning, and flour milling were the traditional industries of Niort, the capital and major city. Nowadays, Niort, with 60,000 inhabitants, is an important commercial and administrative center. In particular it is one of the main financial centers in France (fourth in rank after Paris, Lyon and Lille). Niort is the national headquarters of some of the major insurance companies in France (Mutuelle d'assurance des artisans de France (MAAF), Mutuelle assurance des commerçants et industriels de France et des cadres et des salariés de l'industrie et du commerce (MACIF), Mutuelle d'assurance des instituteurs de France (MAIF) and others) and regional headquarters of others such as Groupama. The regional headquarters of several national banks, including Banque Populaire and Crédit Agricole, are also located there. The services sector is also heavily represented in Niort, in consulting, accounting, brokerage and software. Chemistry, pharmacy (Boiron) and aeronautics (Zodiac Group, Leach International) are the main industries.

Textiles and shoe making, furnitures, mechanics, automotive (Heuliez and Irisbus), chemistry (Rhodia in Melle), food industry and food packaging are the major industries outside of the capital.

The unemployment rate in the département is very low (less than 5%) especially in the north-west, where many small and medium companies are developing rapidly.

The south-west of the département attracts tourists with the Marais Poitevin natural area; the Atlantic coast is close at hand.

== Demographics ==
Population development since 1801:

Historical population

Year	Pop.	±% p.a.
1801	241,916	—
1806	254,105	+0.99%
1821	279,845	+0.65%
1831	288,260	+0.30%
1841	310,203	+0.74%
1851	323,615	+0.42%
1861	328,817	+0.16%
1872	331,243	+0.07%
1881	350,103	+0.62%
1891	354,282	+0.12%
1901	342,474	−0.34%
1911	337,627	−0.14%
1921	310,060	−0.85%
1931	308,481	−0.05%

Year	Pop.	±% p.a.
1936	308,841	+0.02%
1946	312,756	+0.13%
1954	312,842	+0.00%
1962	321,118	+0.33%
1968	325,608	+0.23%
1975	335,829	+0.44%
1982	342,812	+0.29%
1990	345,965	+0.11%
1999	344,392	−0.05%
2007	362,944	+0.66%
2012	371,583	+0.47%
2017	374,351	+0.15%
2023	375,229	+0.04%

=== Principal towns ===
The most populous commune is Niort, the prefecture. As of 2023, there are 7 communes with more than 7,000 inhabitants:

Commune	Population (2023)
Niort	59,854
Bressuire	19,970
Thouars	13,891
Parthenay	10,140
Mauléon	8,573
Saint-Maixent-l'École	7,595
Chauray	7,221

== Politics ==
The president of the Departmental Council is Coralie Denoues, elected in July 2021.

=== Current National Assembly Representatives ===
Constituency	Member	Party
Deux-Sèvres's 1st constituency	Bastien Marchive	PRV
Deux-Sèvres's 2nd constituency	Delphine Batho	Ecology Generation
Deux-Sèvres's 3rd constituency	Jean-Marie Fiévet	Renaissance

== Transport ==
Niort in the south of the département is connected to Paris and Bordeaux by the A10 motorway, with Nantes by the A83, with La Rochelle and Poitiers by the N11. Another important road in the north of the département is the Route nationale 149 (RN149), which runs roughly east–west from Bressuire to Poitiers, passing around the outskirts of Parthenay. This section of the RN149 forms part of the European route E62 from Nantes to Genoa. The road originally ran from Nantes, but has been bypassed in various stages by the new RN249 dual carriageway. The old section from Nantes to Bressuire has been either renamed or downgraded to the D149.

The north and south of the département are connected by relatively minor roads, with the D743 and D748 linking Niort to Parthenay and Bressuire respectively, whilst the D938 connects to Thouars.

The département has two railway stations on the TGV route between Paris and La Rochelle (Niort and Saint-Maixent), with a journey from Niort to Paris taking 2h15. It is also served by several TER Nouvelle-Aquitaine regional railway routes, including a route from Poitiers via Niort to La Rochelle, a route from Niort to Saintes, and a route from Tours to Thouars and Bressuire. The région of Nouvelle-Aquitaine provides inter-urban bus service that connects the towns and villages of the département.

There are no airports with scheduled airline service within the département, although Niort-Souche Airport is used for private movements. The nearest commercial airports are at Poitiers (Poitiers - Biard Airport), La Rochelle (La Rochelle - Île de Ré Airport) and Nantes (Nantes Atlantique Airport).

== Gallery ==
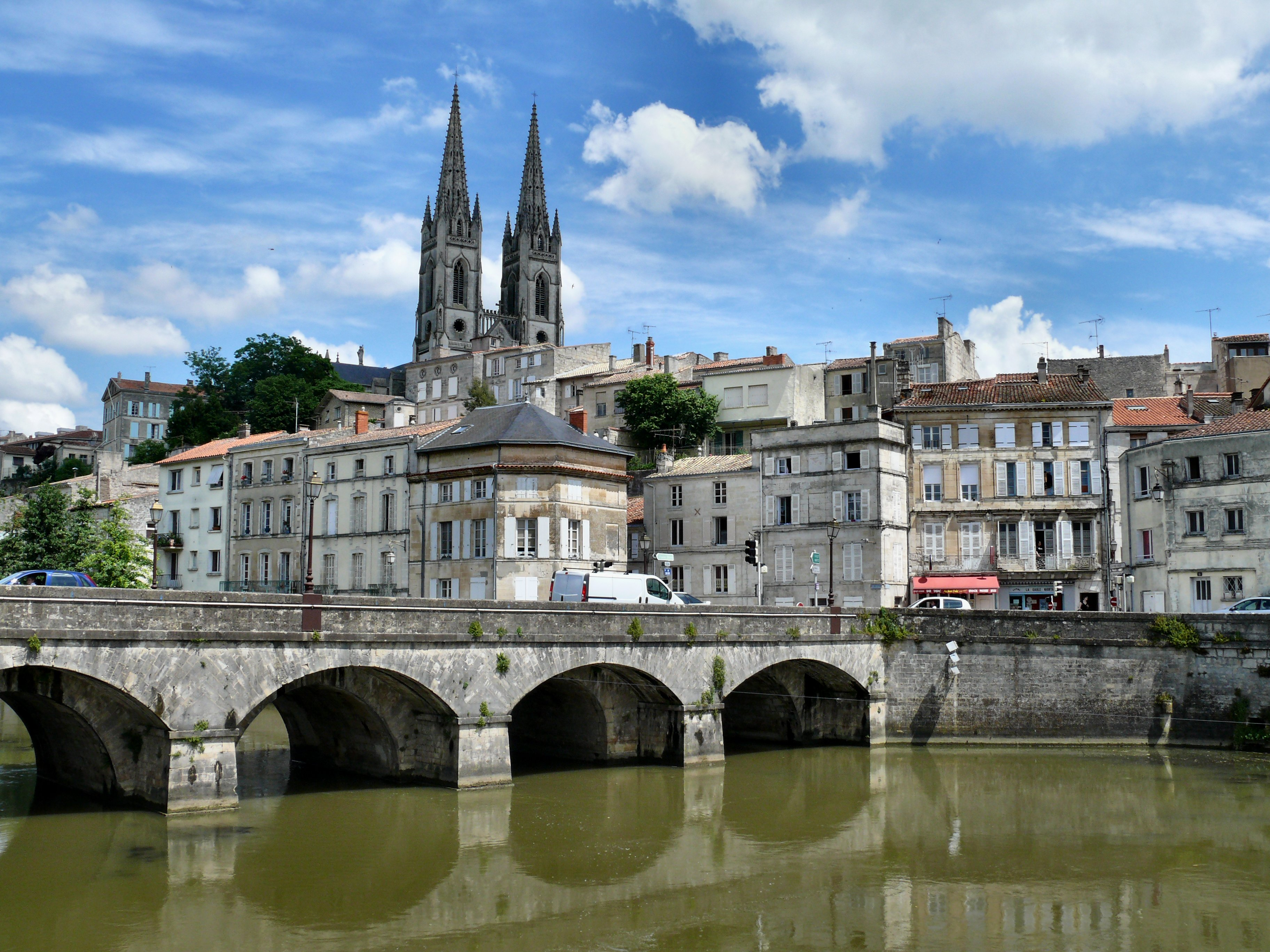
Niort

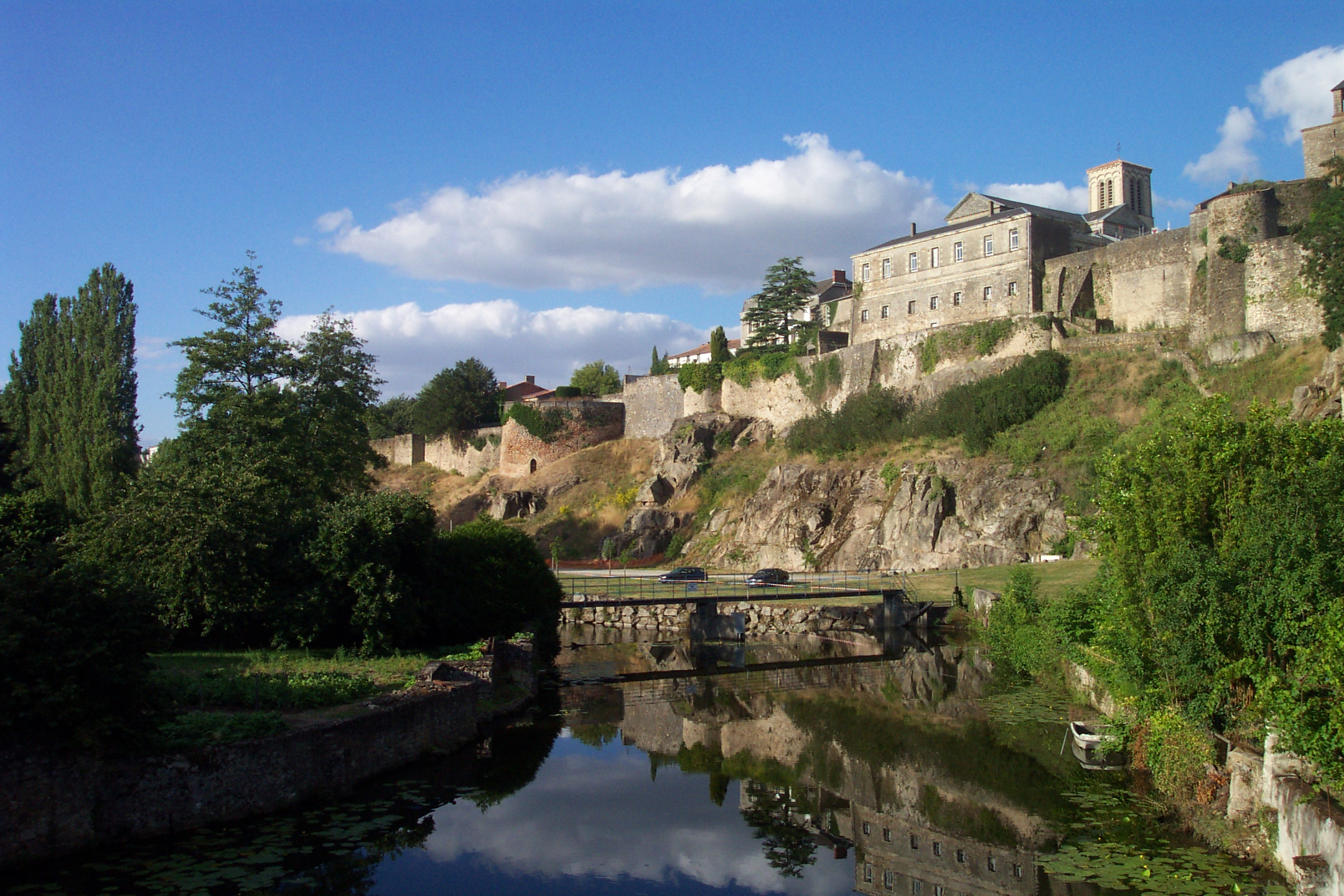
Parthenay

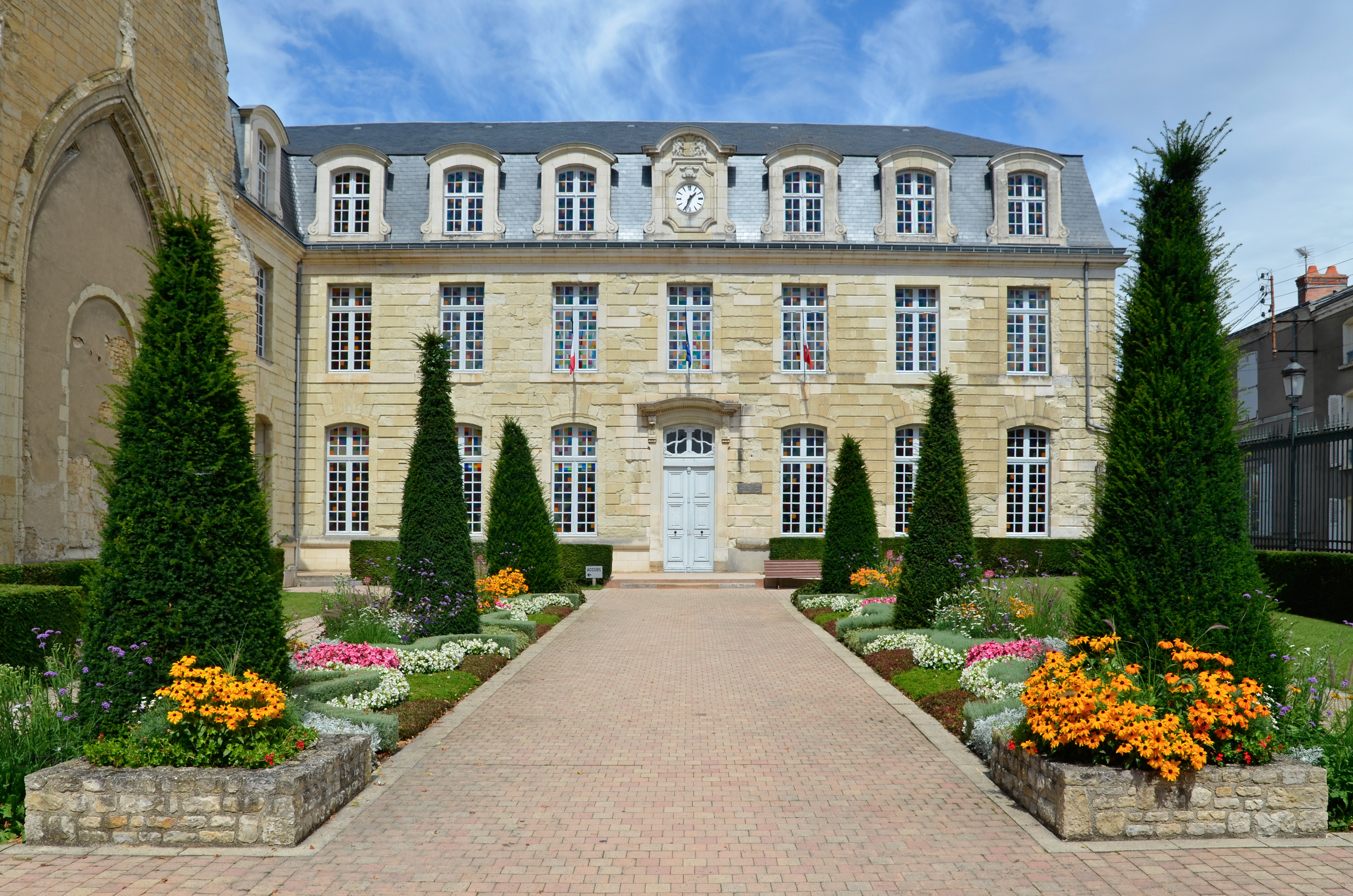
Thouars

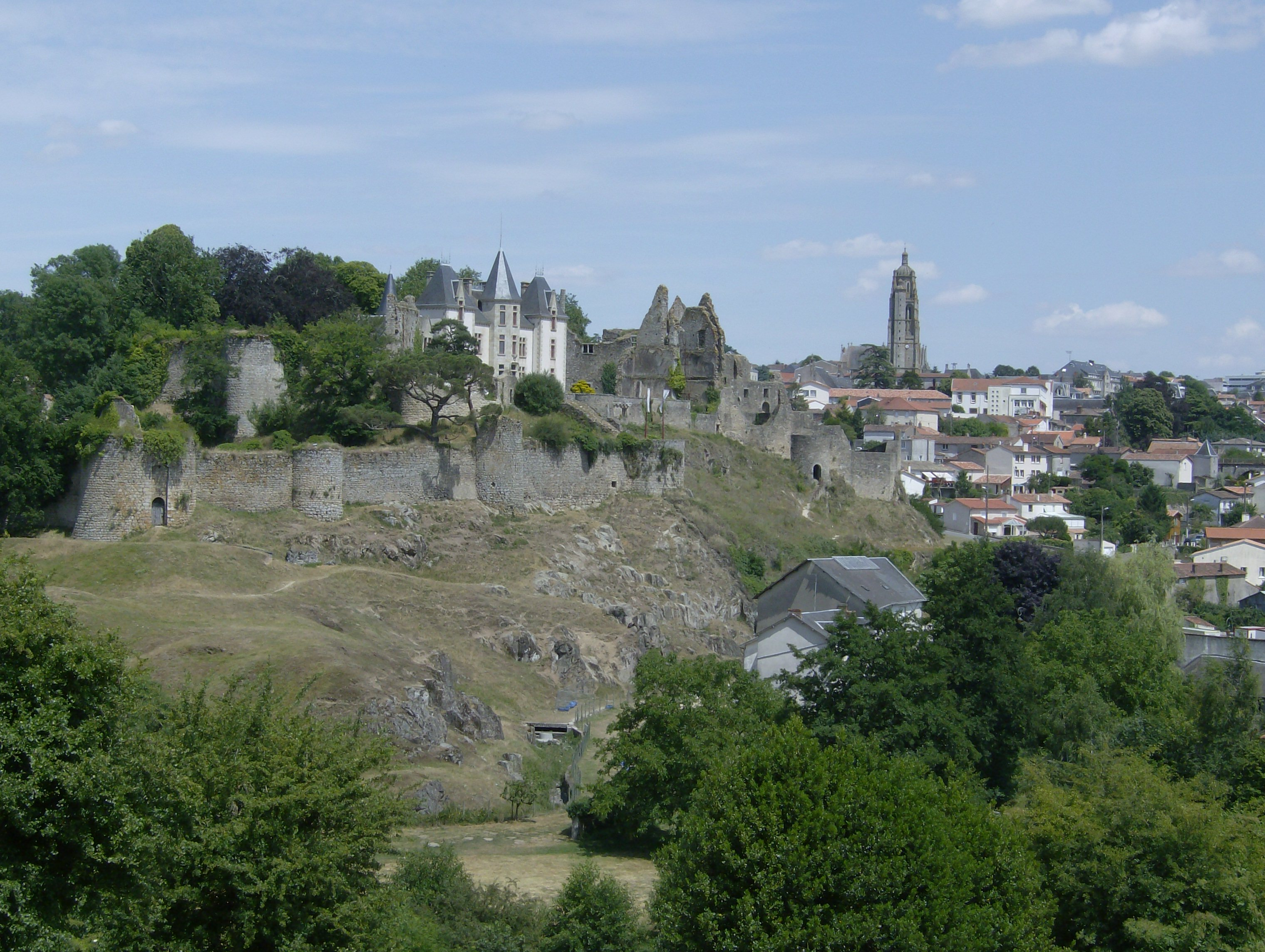
Bressuire

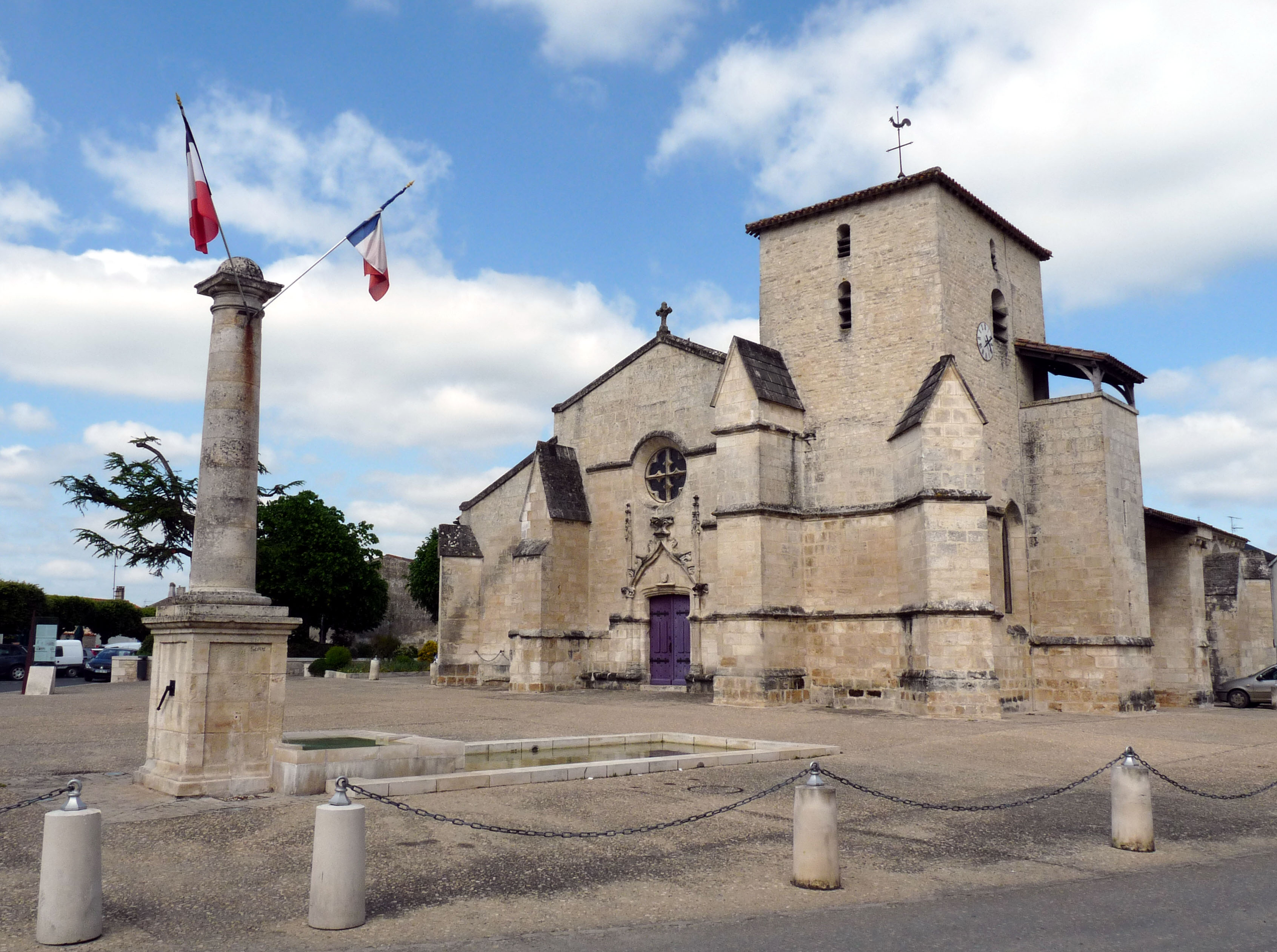
Coulon

== Notable people ==
Famous births in the département:

- Françoise d'Aubigné, marquise de Maintenon (1635–1719), second wife of Louis XIV
- Jacques de Liniers (Santiago de Liniers y Bremond) (1753–1810)
- Louis-Marcelin, marquis de Fontanes (1757–1821), poet and politician
- Henri-Georges Clouzot (1904–1977), film director
- Laurent Cantet (1961), Palme d'Or at the Festival de Cannes 2008, for the movie Entre les murs
- Catherine Breillat (1948), film maker and novelist
- Jean-Hugues Anglade (1955), actor
- René Caillié (1799–1838) explorer, and the first European to return alive from the town of Timbuktu

Famous people related to the département:

- Jean-Baptiste Baujault, French sculptor
- Ségolène Royal (1953), former candidate for the 2007 French presidential election, former representative of the department at the National Assembly, former President of the Poitou-Charentes region (2004–2014) and Minister of Ecology since 2014.

== See also ==
- Anjou wine
- Arrondissements of the Deux-Sèvres department
- Cantons of the Deux-Sèvres department
- Communes of the Deux-Sèvres department
- Saint-Laon Church, Thouars
