= Artus Gouffier, Lord of Boissy =

French nobleman and politician (1474–1519)

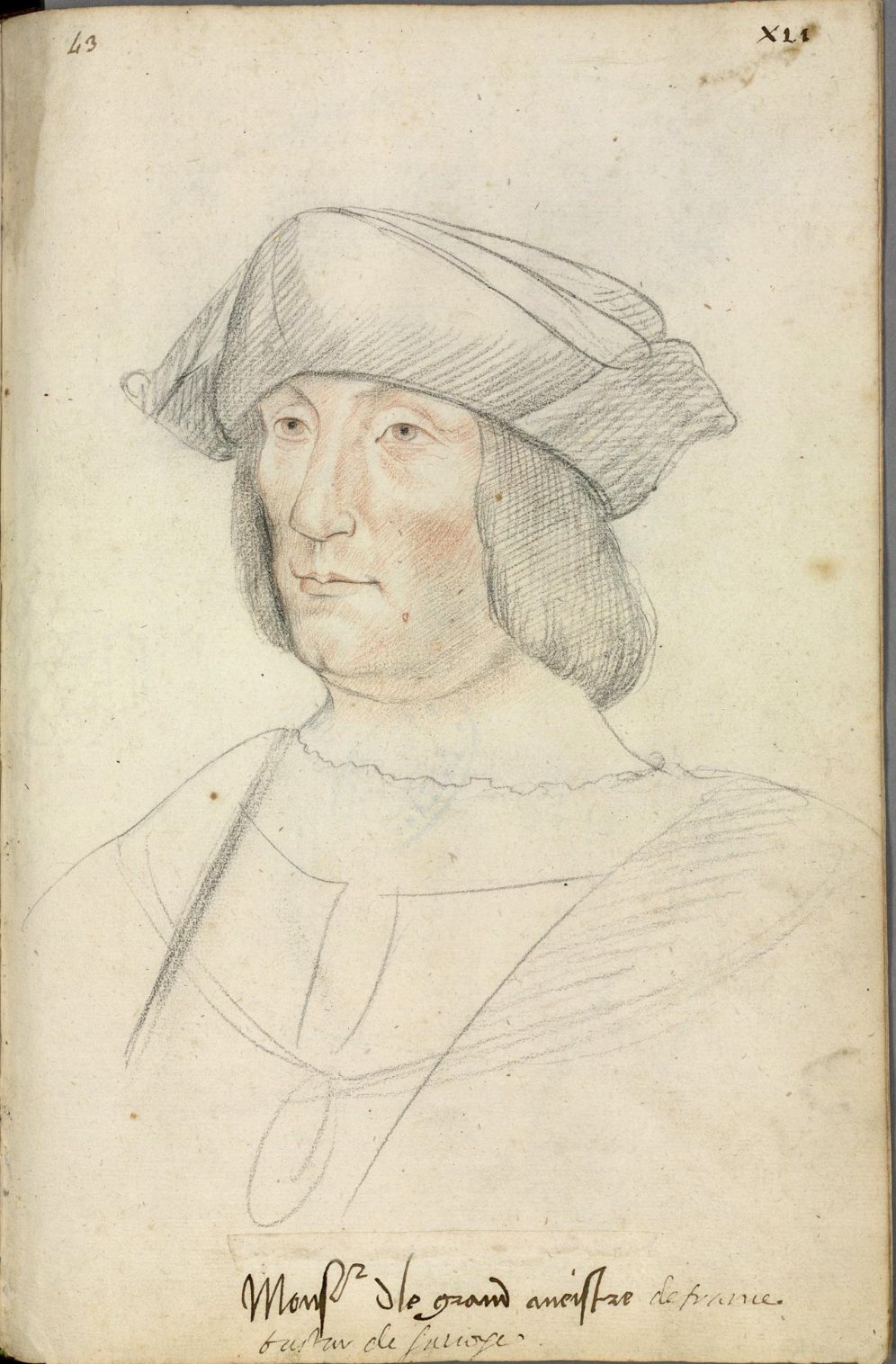
Artus Gouffier

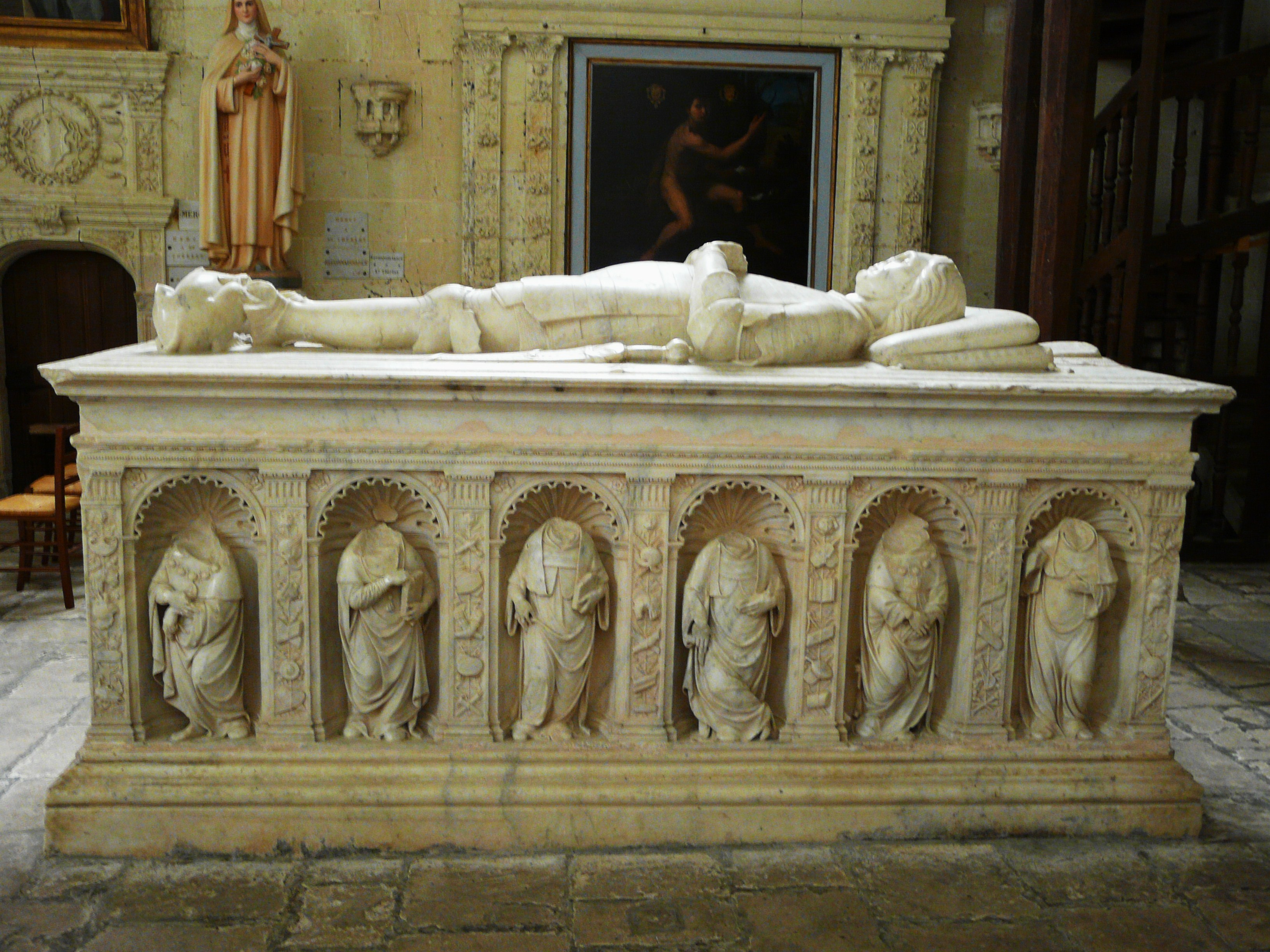
Tomb of Artus Gouffier, in the collégiate church at Oiron.

Artus Gouffier de Boissy (6 September 1474 – 13 May 1519 in Montpellier) was a French nobleman and politician. He was baron of Roannez, count of Étampes, count of Caravaggio, baron of Passavant, of Maulévrier, of la Mothe-Saint-Romain, of Bourg-Charente and of Saint-Loup, lord of Oiron, of Villedieu-sur-Indre, of Valence and of Cazamajor.

== Life ==
The eldest son of Guillaume Gouffier de Boisy, sénéchal of Saintonge, and of Philippine de Montmorency, he began his court career as a page to Charles VIII, who his father had served as preceptor. He accompanied Charles on the conquest of the Kingdom of Naples in 1495, as well as accompanying Louis XII to Italy.

He served as Grand Master of France from January 1515. In 1516 he was a lead negotiator in the Concordat of Bologna, and the Treaty of Noyon, and was attempting to negotiate a lasting peace between France and the House of Habsburg at the time of his early death in 1519. Contemporary commentators asserted that Artus Gouffier was the most influential of the advisors of François I^{er}.

At the Château d'Oiron, Artus had construction works carried out, intended to make it the heart of the family's possessions. In addition to the construction of a gallery, he also started the construction of the Saint-Maurice collegiate church, right next to the castle, which was only completed after his death by his wife and which still houses his Tomb effigy today.

=== Marriage and children ===
He married in February 1499, Hélène d'Hangest, only daughter of Jacques de Hangest, seigneur de Genlis. They had two daughters, Hélène and Anne, and one son Claude Gouffier, his successor, and Grand Squire of France.

French nobility
Preceded by Claude of France	Count of Étampes; 1515-1519	Succeeded by Claude of France
