= Padarn =

6th-century bishop and saint

Saint Padarn
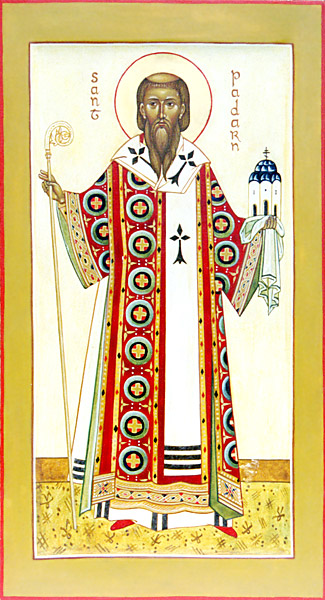
- Eastern Orthodox-style icon of Saint Padarn.

Bishop of Vannes
- Born: c. 5th century AD; Wales
- Died: 15 April 510 AD; Vannes
- Venerated in: Anglican Communion; Eastern Orthodox Church; Roman Catholic Church
- Canonized: pre-Congregation
- Feast: 15 April (repose) 1st November and 20th June (local traditional additional feasts)

Padarn (Latin: Paternus, Padarnus; Welsh: Padarn; Breton: Padern; 4th century AD – c. 550 AD) was an early 6th century British Christian abbot-bishop who founded Saint Padarn's Church in Ceredigion, Wales. He appears to be the same individual as the first bishop of Braga and Saint Paternus of Avranches in Normandy. Padarn built a monastery in Vannes and is considered one of the seven founding saints of Brittany. His early vita is one of five insular and two Breton saints' lives that mention King Arthur independently of Geoffrey of Monmouth's Historia Regum Britanniae.

== Life ==
The Vita Sancti Paterni, a major source for biographical details of Padarn, may be an epitome of a previous and more extensive source. According to the Vita Sancti Paterni, Padarn is Armorican by race, born to "Petran, his father, and Guean, his mother". His parents "dedicated themselves to Christ" and Petran left Letavia (modern Brittany) for Ireland. Thomas Wakeman names Padarn a nephew of Hoel of Cornouaille. However, Canon G. H. Doble believes the supposed Breton origin can no longer be maintained and favours the modern view of a Welsh origin for him, while Bowen believes he was later confused with Breton saints of the same name.

Around the year 524 Padarn traveled to join his father in Ireland. He joined a fellowship of monks led by his cousin, St. Cadvan, who were travelling to Britannia. At this time, as in many saints' lives of the era, there appears to be an aristocratic military function in Padarn's career, for among the travellers were Padarn's cousins, who appointed him as the fourth leader of the troop, saying "you should rule over people for example of life".

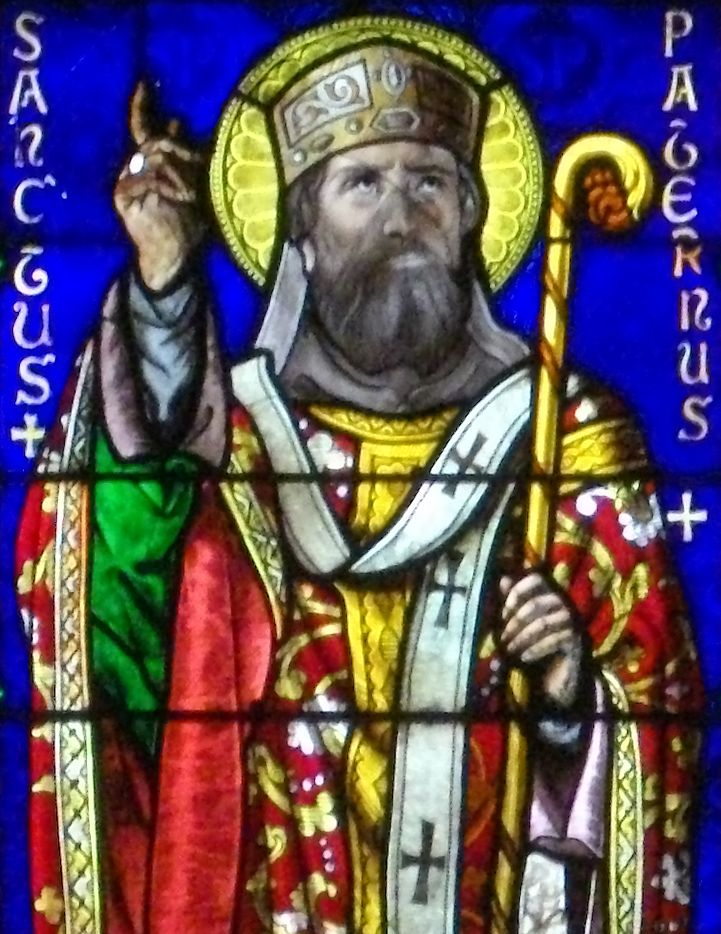
1878 stained glass window of St. Paternus at the Cathedral of Vannes in Morbihan.

Padarn became a student at Illtud's school, Cor Tewdws. Padarn later founded a monastery at Llanbadarn Fawr, near Aberystwyth, which became the seat of a new diocese, with him as its first bishop. He then left it in the charge of a trusted steward and proceeded to Ireland. Padarn's spiritual countenance was sufficient to calm the armies of kings of two provinces.

After Padarn returned to Llanbadarn Fawr, Maelgwn Gwynedd tried to cheat him out of property belonging to the monastery. Two of Maelgwn's evil heralds were undone by the trial by ordeal of boiling water; scalded and defeated, "Their souls in raven-forms fly to the riverbed, which unto this day by the name of one of them is called, to wit, Graban." Maelgwn Gwynedd himself is first cursed and then cured of his sickness and blindness when he comes on bended knee to ask forgiveness, and to bestow lands on Padarn's community, which are laid out with the exactitude of a deed: "a quantity of land, that is, from the mouth of the river Rheidiol upwards until it touches at its head the limit of the river Clarach; and along the length of the same river as far as the sea is the limit prolonged."

In the Vita Sancti Paterni Padarn travels on a pilgrimage to Jerusalem with Saint David and Saint Teilo for all three to be ordained bishops by the patriarch. Along the way they acquired the gift of tongues so that whomever they spoke to understood them in his own language. The patriarch gave Paternus two gifts, a crozier and a finely woven tunic. On their return, they amicably divided Britannia into three bishoprics.

Padarn finally returned to Letavia, where his fame filled the region and "made peace" with the bishop Samson in Vannes, where Padarn his built a monastery and subsequently made a peace with the six bishops of Armorica, of which he now made a seventh.

== Padarn and Arthur ==
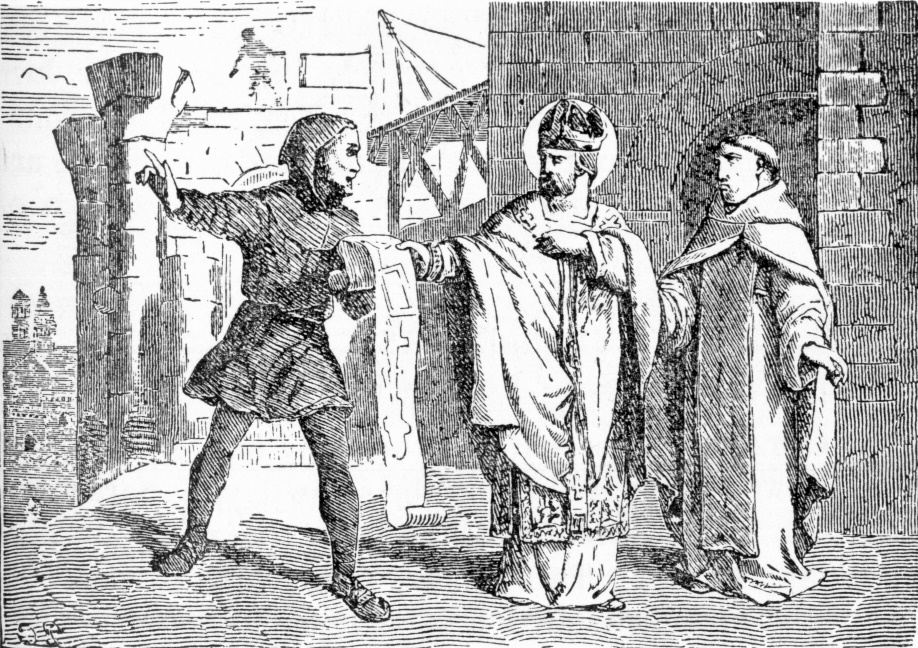
1878 sketch from Little Pictorial Lives of the Saints, by Benzinger Brothers.

In the most celebrated episode, King Arthur tries to steal Padarn's tunic and subsequently becomes Christian. It's too late to be reliable. But the episode was probably meant to increase Padarn's prestige and credibility as a saint by being granted credit for "Christianizing" the semi-historical leader who allegedly defeated the Anglo-Saxons with the help of Jesus Christ and the Virgin Mary in the battle of Mount Badon according to the 9th century monk Nennius. The author also seemed to confuse this Padarn with Padarn Redcoat whose coat was one of the Thirteen Treasures of the Island of Britain;

When Padarn was in his church resting after so much labour at sea, a certain tyrant, Arthur by name, was traversing the regions on either side, who one day came to the cell of saint Padarn the bishop. And while he was addressing Padarn, he looked at the tunic, which he, being pierced with the zeal of avarice, sought for his own. The saint answering said, "This tunic is not fitting for the habit of any malign person, but for the habit of the clerical office." He went out of the monastery in a rage. And again he returns in wrath, that he might take away the tunic against the counsels of his own companions. One of the disciples of Padarn seeing him returning in fury, ran to saint Padarn and said, "The tyrant, who went out from here before, is returning. Reviling, stamping, he levels the ground with his feet". Padarn answers "Nay rather, may the earth swallow him." With the word straightway the earth opens the hollow of its depth, and swallows Arthur up to his chin. He immediately acknowledging his guilt begins to praise both God and Padarn, until, while he begs forgiveness, the earth delivered him up. From that place on bent knees he begged the saint for indulgence, whom the saint forgave. And he took Padarn as his continual patron, and so departed.

== Paternus of Avranches ==
The British Padarn appears to be the same person as Saint Paternus of Avranches in Normandy. By tradition, it is said that he was born in Poitiers, became a monk at the Abbey of Saint-Jouin-de-Marnes in France, and retreated with his fellow monk, Saint Scubilion, to the forest of Scissy in the diocese of Coutances before the Bishop of Coutances made him a priest in 512.

== Veneration ==
Feast day: April 16 Three days were kept to honour Padern in Armorica; the Armoricans celebrate three solemnities of his, namely, that day of the Kalends of November, when he formed perpetual unity with the six chief saints of Letia, the day of his obit, and the day he received the order of the episcopate, the twelfth before the Kalends of the month of July.

As well as the church at Llanbadarn Fawr, there is a second church dedicated to him, in Llanberis in Gwynedd, and three churches in Radnorshire.

St Padarn’s Institute, located at St Michael’s Conference Centre, Llandaff, handles training for ministry in the Church in Wales.

== Bibliography ==
- Vita Sancti Paterno: The Life of Saint Padarn, written in Cemis, Pembrokeshire, in the twelfth century. Found in the British Library Cotton Manuscript Vespasian A xiv.
- "Vita Sancti Paterni: The Life of Saint Padarn and the Original Miniu", Trivium 33 (2003)(Charles Thomas and David Howlett).
