= Claude Gouffier =

French nobleman and book collector (1500/1–1570)

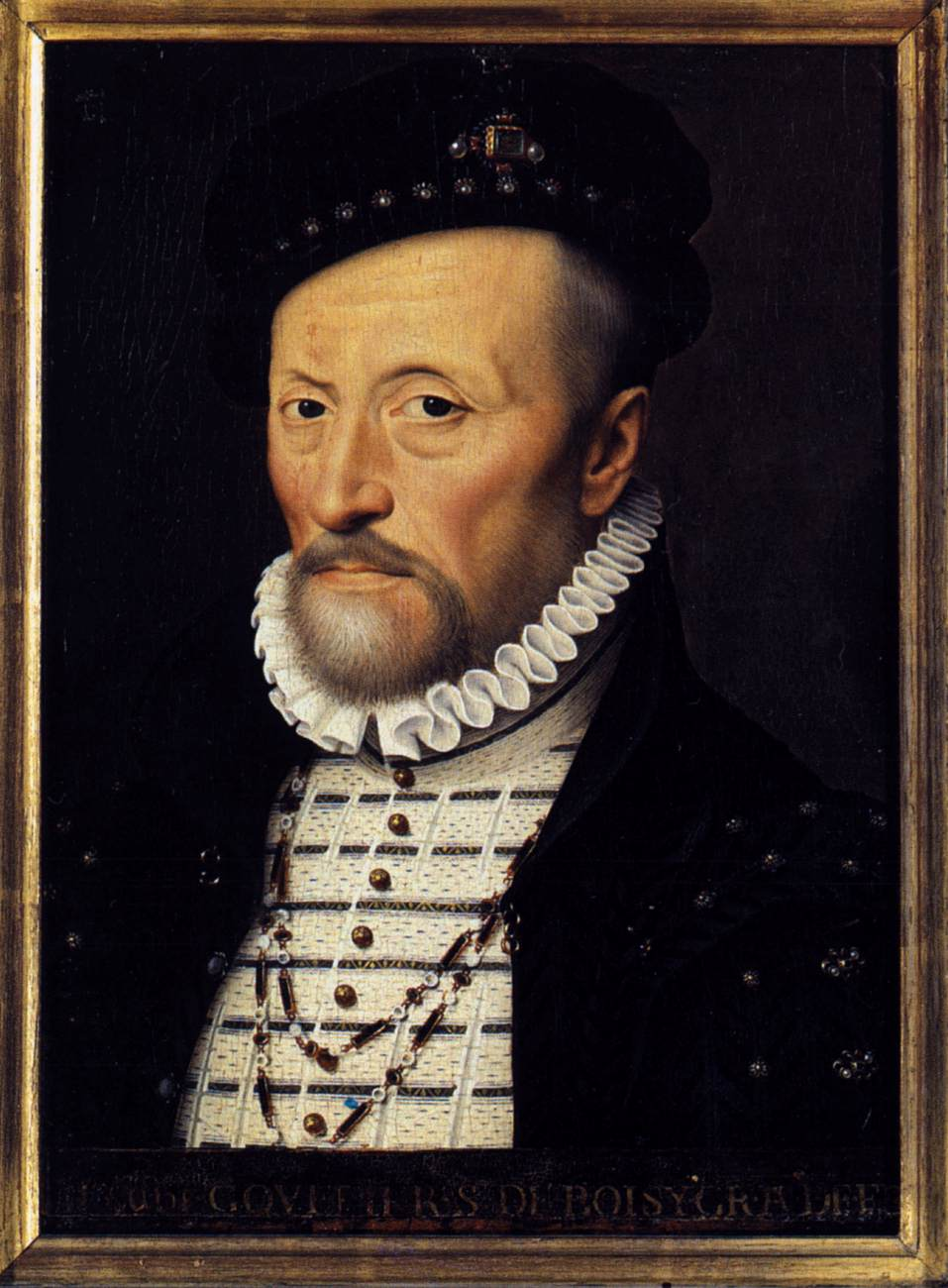
- Claude Gouffier
- Born: 1500 / 1501; Château d'Oiron, Oiron, France
- Died: 1570; Villers-Cotterêts, France
- Occupation: Equerry
- Title: Seigneur de Boissy
- Predecessor: Artus Gouffier
- Parent: Artus Gouffier

Claude Gouffier was a French nobleman and book collector. He was the model for the "Marquis de Carabas" from the story Puss in Boots by Charles Perrault.

== Biography ==
He was the son of Artus Gouffier, tutor to the count of Angoulême who eventually rose to the throne as Francis I. Under Francis I, the Gouffier family prospered and were important patrons of both art and literature. This important dynasty was seated at the estate of Château d'Oiron. Claude Gouffier was granted knighthood in 1533, and in 1546 created Marquis of Boissy and Caravaz.

He served at the Battle of Pavia, where he was one of the knights taken prisoner along with Francis I after the disastrous defeat of the French army. He was eventually released but was captured again during a later French campaign in Italy by Ferrante Gonzaga in 1536. He was ransomed two years later by Francis for the huge sum of 6000 gold crowns in 1538.

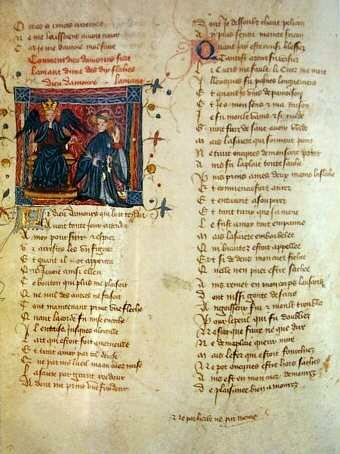
Roman de la Rose, a 15th-century manuscript from the Gouffier's collection, Czartoryski Museum.

Gouffier's official title was Grand Écuyer de France, or Master of the King's Stables, to Henri II, although his life's main vocation seems to have been the collection of books and unusual objects. He was said by Charles Isaac Elton to be "a collector of an essentially modern type. He bought autographs and historical portraits, as well as rare MSS. and good specimens of printing, and was careful to have his books well clothed in the fashionable painted binding."

He was married five times. His first wife was Jacqueline de La Tremoille, whom he wed in 1527. She attempted to murder him by poisoning and was sentenced to prison (and her confessor, to death.) She died in 1544. His next wife was Françoise de Brosse de Britain, who died in childbirth in 1558, and the next was Mary de Gaignon de St. Bohaire, lady in waiting to Catherine de Medici, who perished in 1565. In 1567 he married Claude de Beaune, who also died. His fifth marriage was in 1569, to Antoinette de La Tour-Landry, lady in waiting to Catherine de Medici.

Like many other wealthy aristocrats of the Renaissance, Gouffier maintained a Wunderkammer or "Cabinet of Curiosities", which included an assortment of scientific and zoological artifacts. This has been expanded in the current day to include diverse works of art from all over the world. The original Wunderkammer collection is preserved to this day at the Château d'Oiron – and now includes a lifelike wax figure of Gouffier himself.
