= Plaine-et-Vallées =

- Commune
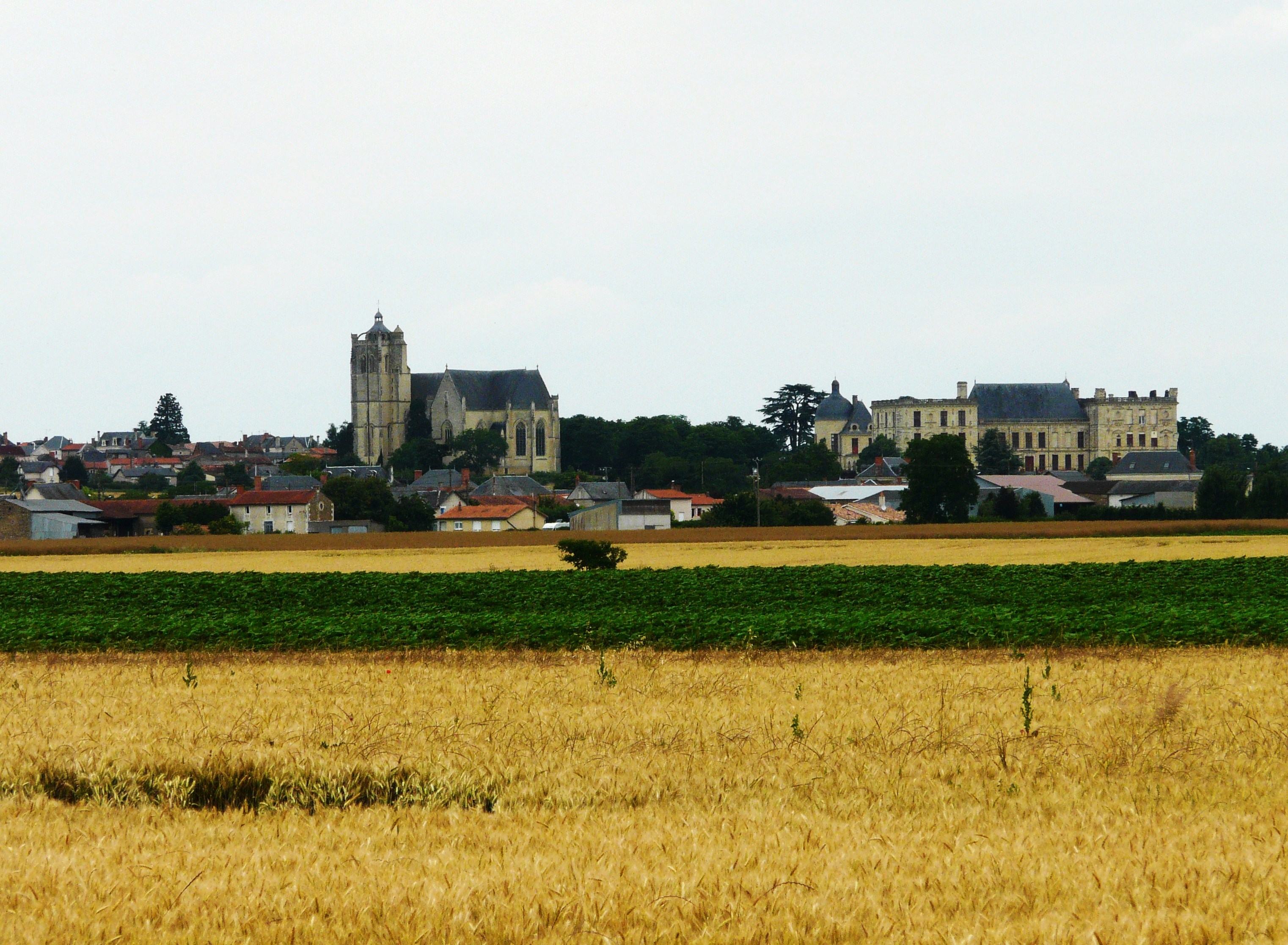
- A general view of Oiron
- Location of Plaine-et-Vallées
- Location within France Location within Nouvelle-Aquitaine
- Coordinates: 46°57′07″N 0°04′49″W
- Country: France
- Region: Nouvelle-Aquitaine
- Department: Deux-Sèvres
- Arrondissement: Bressuire
- Canton: Le Val de Thouet
- Intercommunality: Thouarsais

Government
  - Mayor (2020–2026): Christiane Babin
- Area^{1}: 92.71 km^{2} (35.80 sq mi)
- Highest elevation: 133 m (436 ft)
- Lowest elevation: 47 m (154 ft)
- Population (2023): 2,317
  - Density: 24.99/km^{2} (64.73/sq mi)
- Time zone: UTC+01:00 (CET)
  - Summer (DST): UTC+02:00 (CEST)
- INSEE/Postal code: 79196 /79100
- ^{1} French Land Register data, which excludes lakes, ponds, glaciers > 1 km^{2} (0.386 sq mi or 247 acres) and river estuaries.

Plaine-et-Vallées (French pronunciation: [plɛn e vale], literally Plain and Valleys) is a commune in the Deux-Sèvres department in western France. It was established on 1 January 2019 by merger of the former communes of Oiron (the seat), Brie, Saint-Jouin-de-Marnes and Taizé-Maulais.

== Population ==
Population data refer to the area corresponding with the commune as of January 2025.

Historical population
Year	Pop.	±% p.a.
1968	2,893	—
1975	2,661	−1.19%
1982	2,548	−0.62%
1990	2,584	+0.18%
1999	2,440	−0.64%
2007	2,502	+0.31%
2012	2,488	−0.11%
2017	2,405	−0.68%
2023	2,317	−0.62%
Source: INSEE

== See also ==
- Communes of the Deux-Sèvres department
