= Brie, Deux-Sèvres =

Brie
- Part of Plaine-et-Vallées
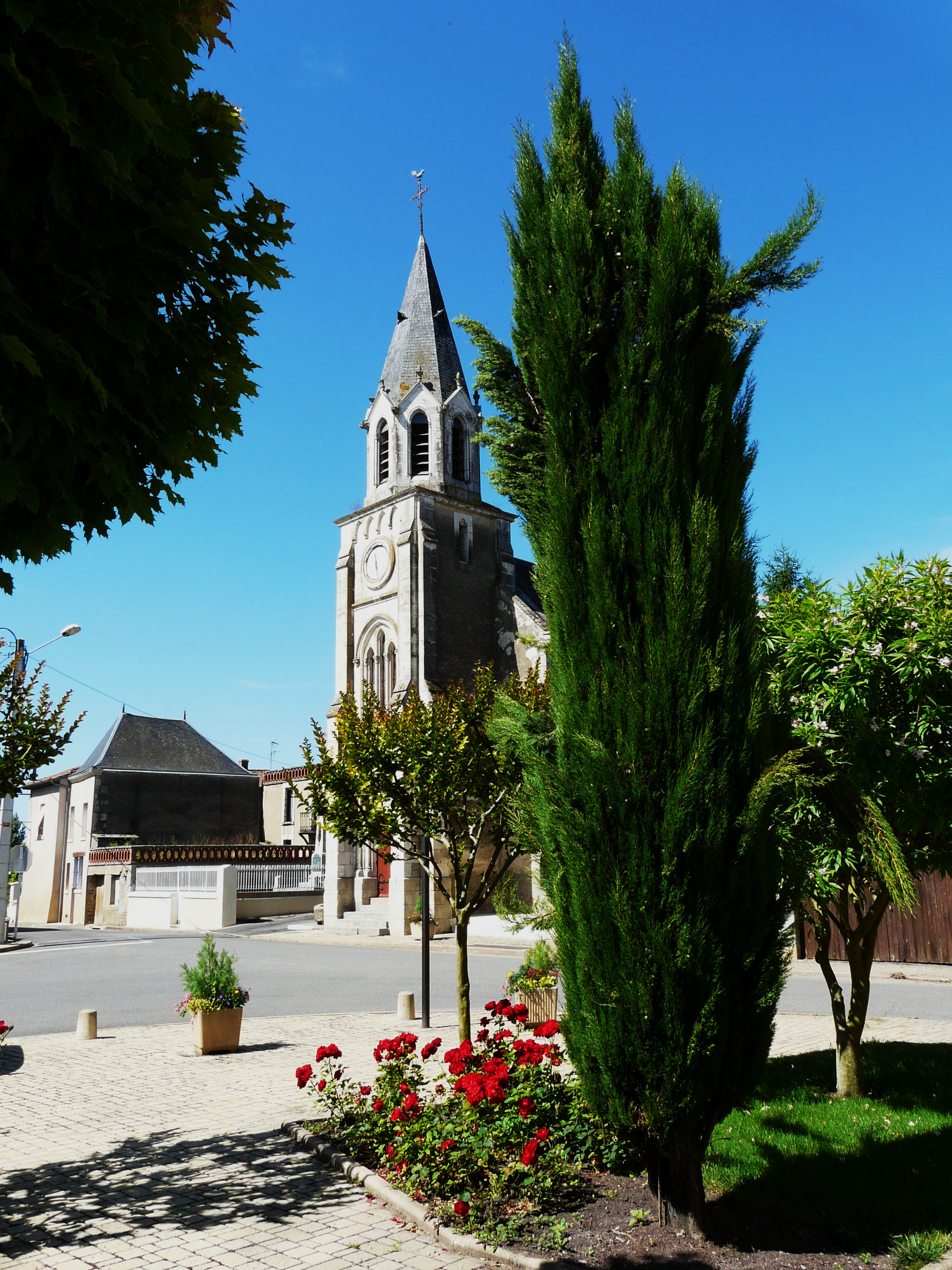
- The church in Brie
- Location of Brie
- Location within France Location within Nouvelle-Aquitaine
- Coordinates: 46°55′14″N 0°02′23″W
- Country: France
- Region: Nouvelle-Aquitaine
- Department: Deux-Sèvres
- Arrondissement: Bressuire
- Canton: Le Val de Thouet
- Commune: Plaine-et-Vallées
- Area^{1}: 11.96 km^{2} (4.62 sq mi)
- Elevation: 88 m (289 ft)
- Highest elevation: 71 m (233 ft)
- Lowest elevation: 50 m (160 ft)
- Population (2022): 173
  - Density: 14.5/km^{2} (37.5/sq mi)
- Time zone: UTC+01:00 (CET)
  - Summer (DST): UTC+02:00 (CEST)
- Postal code: 79100
- ^{1} French Land Register data, which excludes lakes, ponds, glaciers > 1 km^{2} (0.386 sq mi or 247 acres) and river estuaries.

Brie (French pronunciation: [bʁi]) is a former commune in the Deux-Sèvres department in the Nouvelle-Aquitaine region in western France. On 1 January 2019, it was merged into the new commune Plaine-et-Vallées.

== Geography ==
The commune of Brie, located north of the department of Deux-Sèvres, is limited to the east by the department of Vienne. Located 15 km (9 mi) east-southeast of Thouars, it is watered by the Vieille Dive, a secondary arm of the river Dive.

The municipality of Brie is part of the community of communes of Thouarsais and the union of Pays Thouarsais.

== History ==
On the map of Cassini de Thury showing France between 1756 and 1789, the village is identified as Brye.

By prefectural order of December 4, 1972, effective January 1, 1973, the municipalities of Bilazais, Brie and Noizé merged with Oiron. On 14 February 1983, Brie became independent again (prefectural decree of 11 February 1983).

== Policy and administration ==
List of successive mayors

- Until January 2002 the mayor was Yvon Réau.
- From February 2002 and re-elected in 2008 the mayor was Norbert Bonneau PS.

== Places and monuments ==
- The church whose stained-glass windows were redone in modern form, which brings a very particular luminosity inside the nave
- The old chapel of Sazais.
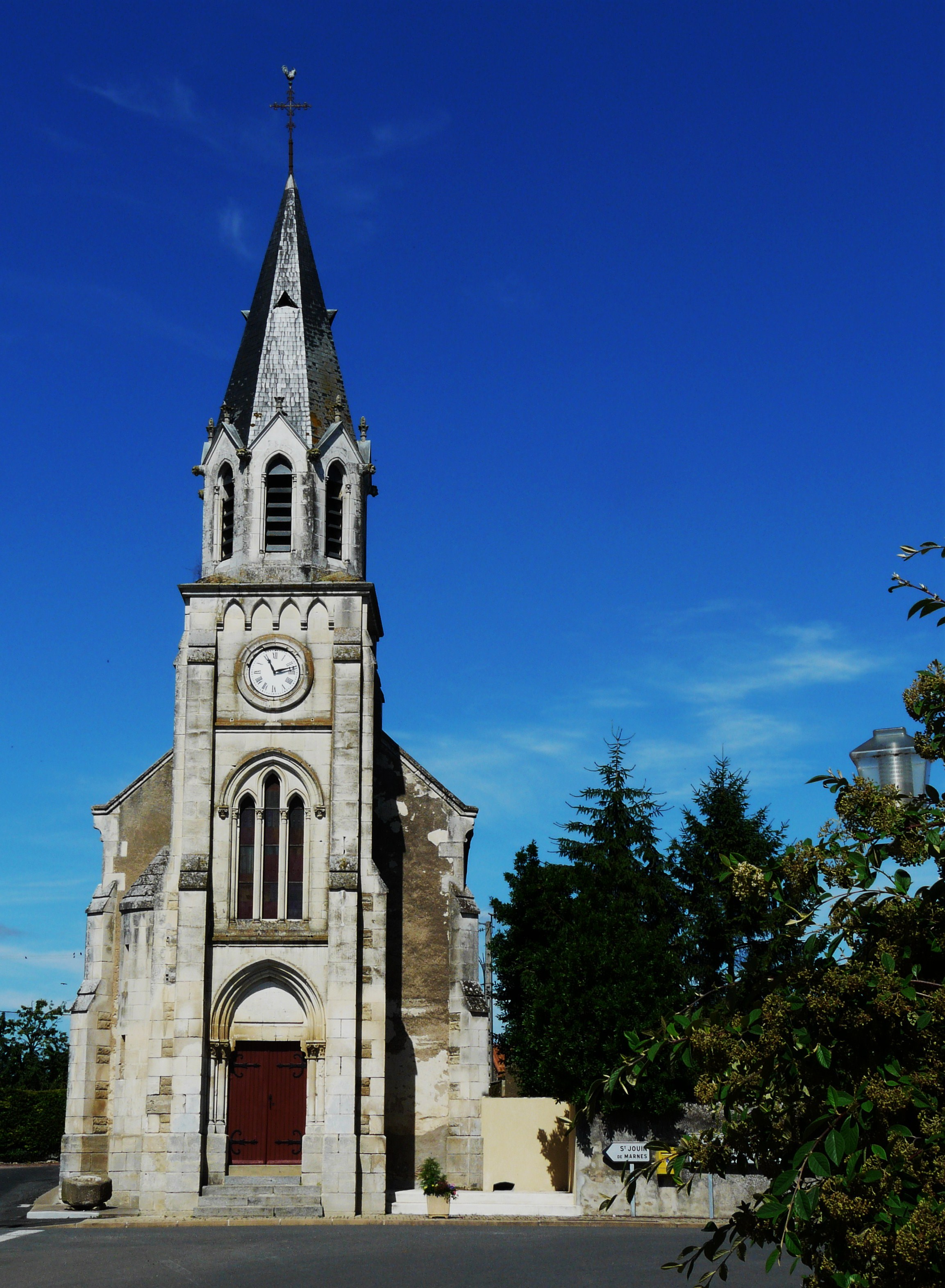
L'église

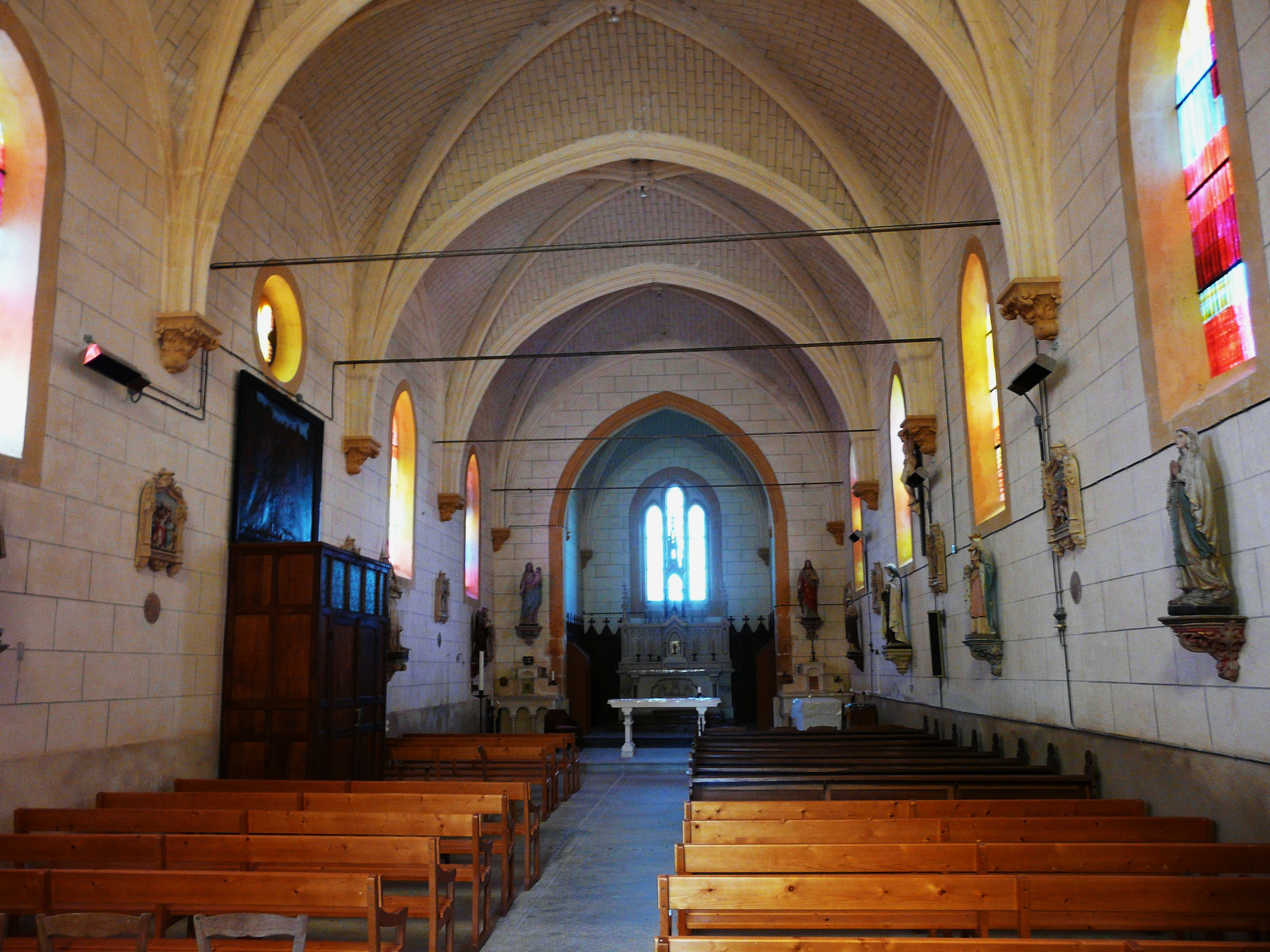
Nef de l'église

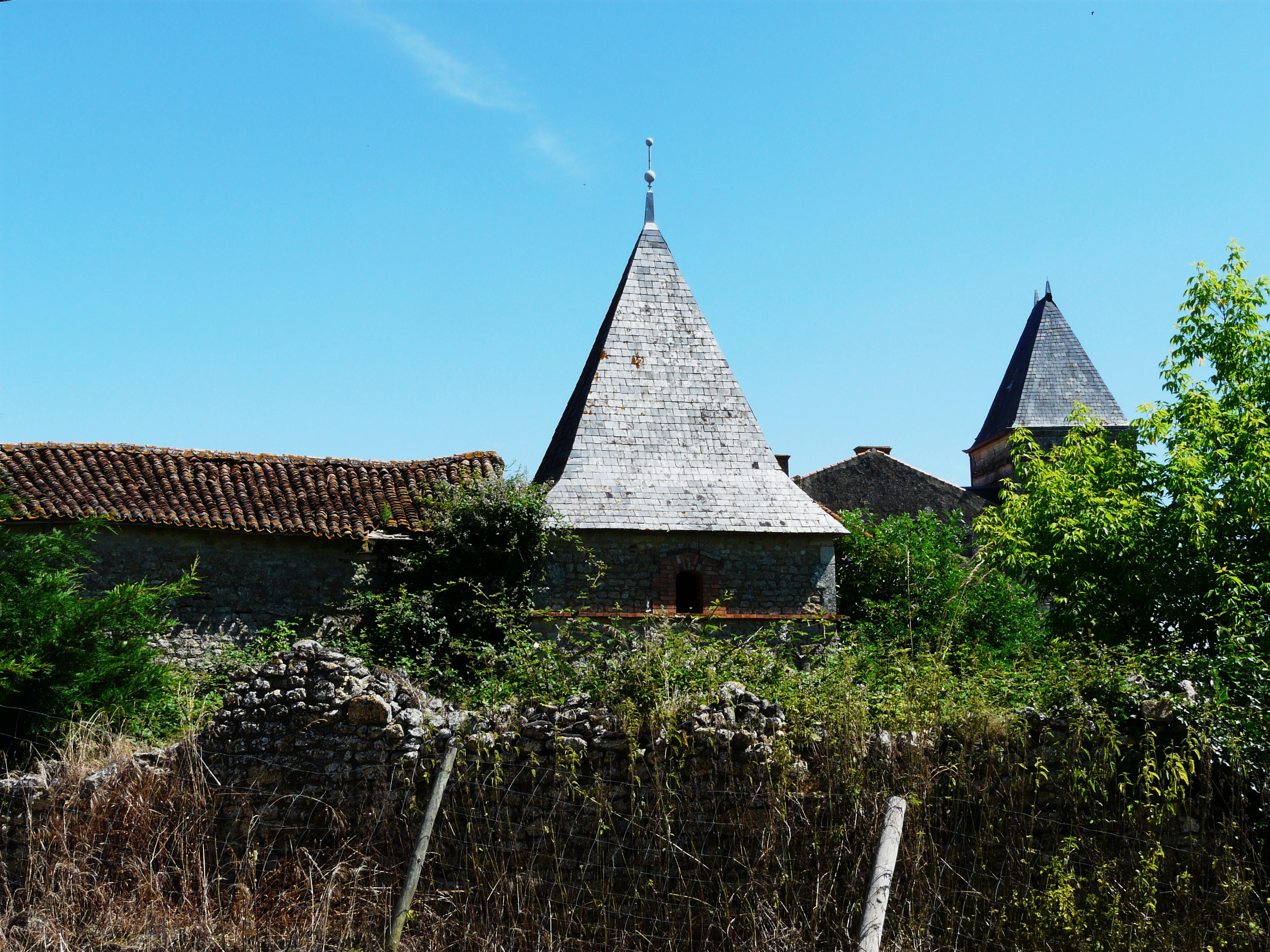
L'ancienne chapelle de Sazais

== See also ==
- Communes of the Deux-Sèvres department
