= Saint-Jouin-de-Marnes =

- Part of Plaine-et-Vallées
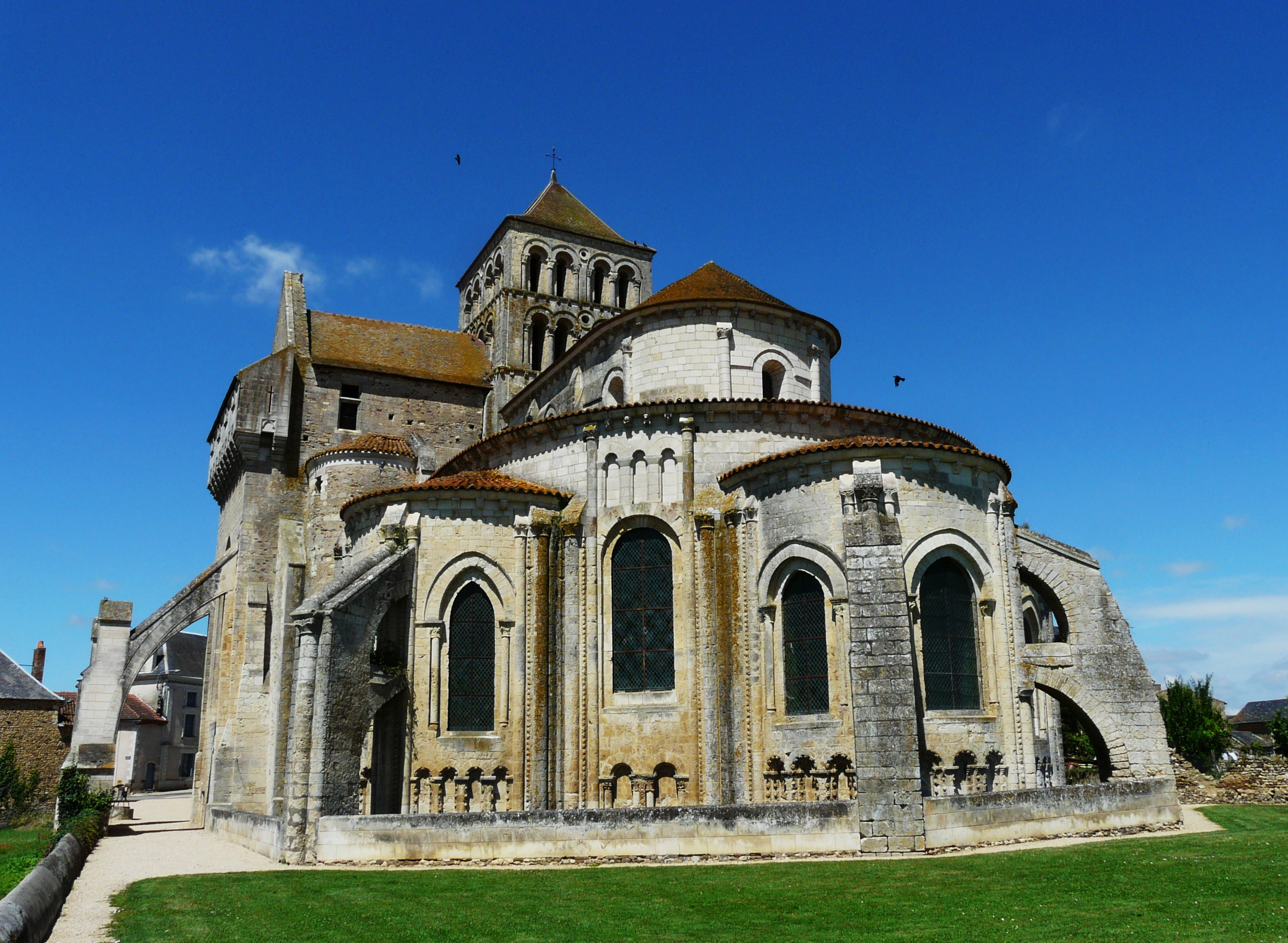
- The former abbey church in Saint-Jouin-de-Marnes
- Location of Saint-Jouin-de-Marnes
- Location within France Location within Nouvelle-Aquitaine
- Coordinates: 46°52′57″N 0°03′08″W
- Country: France
- Region: Nouvelle-Aquitaine
- Department: Deux-Sèvres
- Arrondissement: Bressuire
- Canton: Le Val de Thouet
- Commune: Plaine-et-Vallées
- Area^{1}: 22.77 km^{2} (8.79 sq mi)
- Elevation: 110 m (360 ft)
- Highest elevation: 132 m (433 ft)
- Lowest elevation: 51 m (167 ft)
- Population (2022): 535
  - Density: 23.5/km^{2} (60.9/sq mi)
- Time zone: UTC+01:00 (CET)
  - Summer (DST): UTC+02:00 (CEST)
- Postal code: 79600
- ^{1} French Land Register data, which excludes lakes, ponds, glaciers > 1 km^{2} (0.386 sq mi or 247 acres) and river estuaries.

Saint-Jouin-de-Marnes (French pronunciation: [sɛ̃ ʒwɛ̃ də maʁn], literally Saint-Jouin of Marnes) is a former commune in the Deux-Sèvres department in western France. On 1 January 2019, it was merged into the new commune Plaine-et-Vallées.

== See also ==
- Communes of the Deux-Sèvres department
