= Taizé-Maulais =

- Part of Plaine-et-Vallées
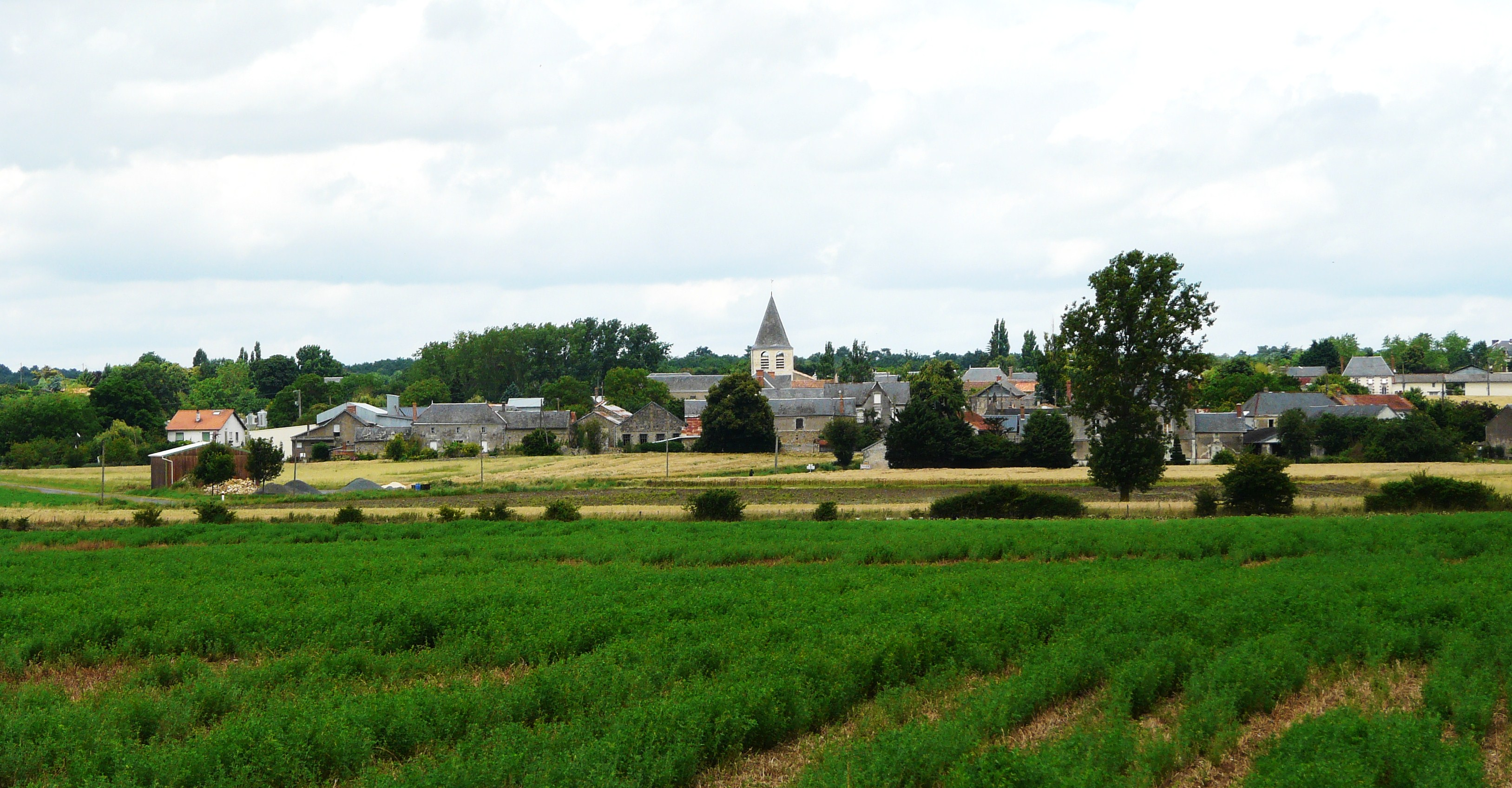
- A general view of Taizé-Maulais
- Location of Taizé-Maulais
- Location within France Location within Nouvelle-Aquitaine
- Coordinates: 46°55′34″N 0°06′57″W
- Country: France
- Region: Nouvelle-Aquitaine
- Department: Deux-Sèvres
- Arrondissement: Bressuire
- Canton: Le Val de Thouet
- Commune: Plaine-et-Vallées
- Area^{1}: 21.23 km^{2} (8.20 sq mi)
- Elevation: 90 m (300 ft)
- Highest elevation: 125 m (410 ft)
- Lowest elevation: 52 m (171 ft)
- Population (2022): 725
  - Density: 34.1/km^{2} (88.4/sq mi)
- Time zone: UTC+01:00 (CET)
  - Summer (DST): UTC+02:00 (CEST)
- Postal code: 79100
- ^{1} French Land Register data, which excludes lakes, ponds, glaciers > 1 km^{2} (0.386 sq mi or 247 acres) and river estuaries.

Taizé-Maulais (French pronunciation: [tɛze molɛ]; before 2016: Taizé) is a former commune in the Deux-Sèvres department in western France. It was created in 1973 by the merger of two former communes: Taizé and Maulais. On 1 January 2019, it was merged into the new commune Plaine-et-Vallées.

== See also ==
- Communes of the Deux-Sèvres department
