= Château d'Oiron =

Castle in Oiron, France

Coordinates: 46°57′08″N 0°4′39″W

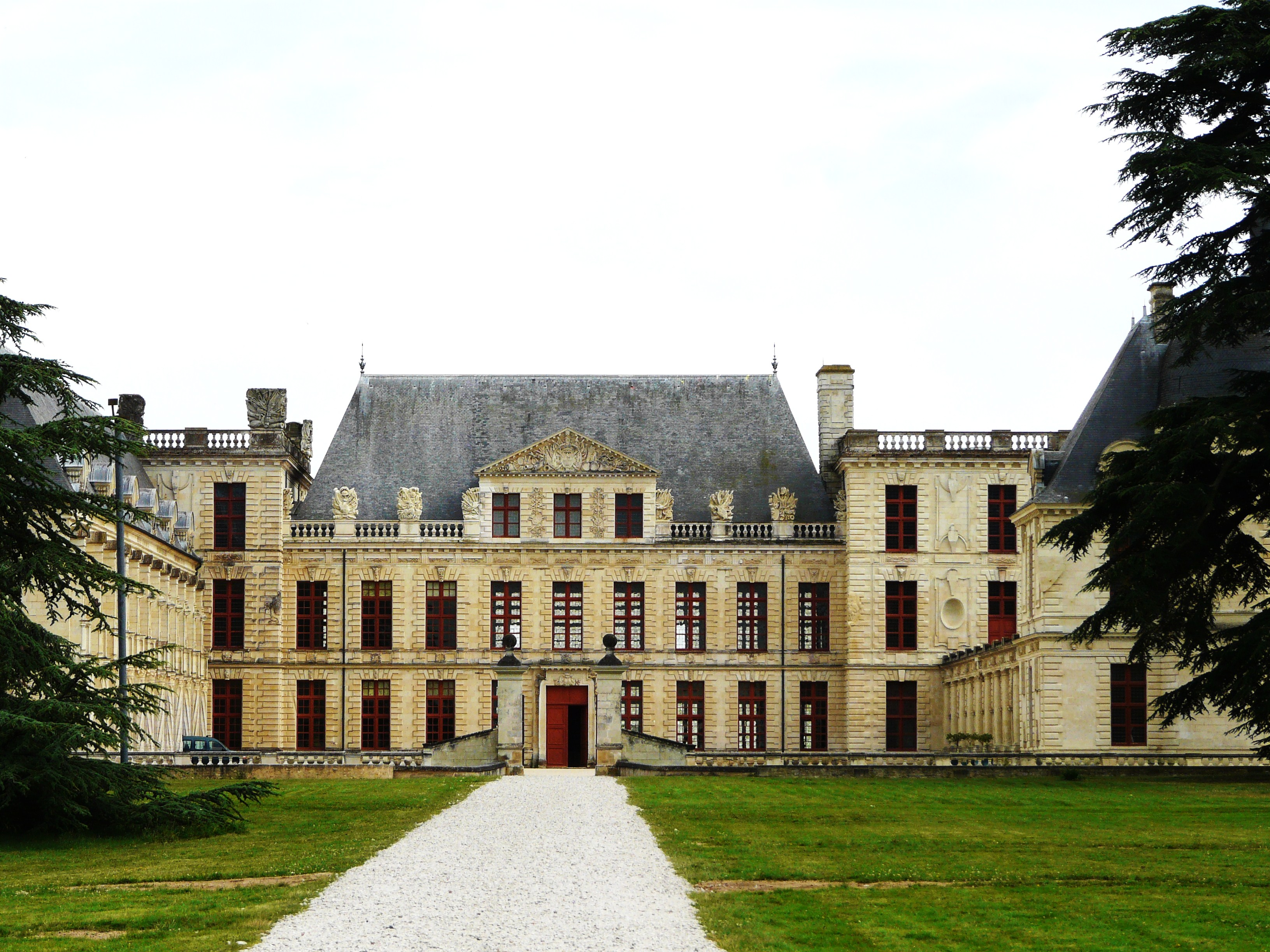
Front of Château d'Oiron

The Château d'Oiron is located in Oiron, in the Deux-Sèvres département of western France. It has its origins in the 15th century war with the English for control of France when a victorious Charles VII of France gave the domain and great forest of Oiron to Guillaume Gouffier who became governor of Touraine. This château is the background for Charles Perrault's fairy tale, Puss in Boots. King Louis XIV's mistress, Madame de Montespan was one of the residents in the place.

== History ==
Today, Oiron is only a short drive from the royal châteaux in the Val de Loire, but in the 15th century it was considered far removed from the seat of power at the royal domains. Nonetheless, Guillaume Gouffier built a magnificent château and his offspring updated and improved it. In 1538, his daughter-in-law, Helene de Hengest, was responsible for the construction of a collegiate church adjacent to the château. In 1551, Henry II and his entire court were guests of Claude Gouffier who had been granted the title Marquis de Caravaz. Claude Gouffier served as the model for Charles Perrault's "Marquis de Carabas" in his story, Puss in Boots.

Two generations later, another Gouffier was exiled from the king's court by Cardinal Richelieu in 1620. In the mid 17th century, Charlotte Gouffier became enamored with the renowned intellect, Blaise Pascal (1623–62), who spent considerable time at the Château d'Oiron. After Pascal died, Charlotte Gouffier married Francois d'Aubusson, the duc de La Feuillade, who enhanced the castle with his wealth and connections to Louis XIV. With the renovations, the castle ended up with a main building and two long projecting wings, one of which is a Renaissance structure built over a cloister. One of the galleries contains one of the most prestigious works of art from the French Renaissance period.

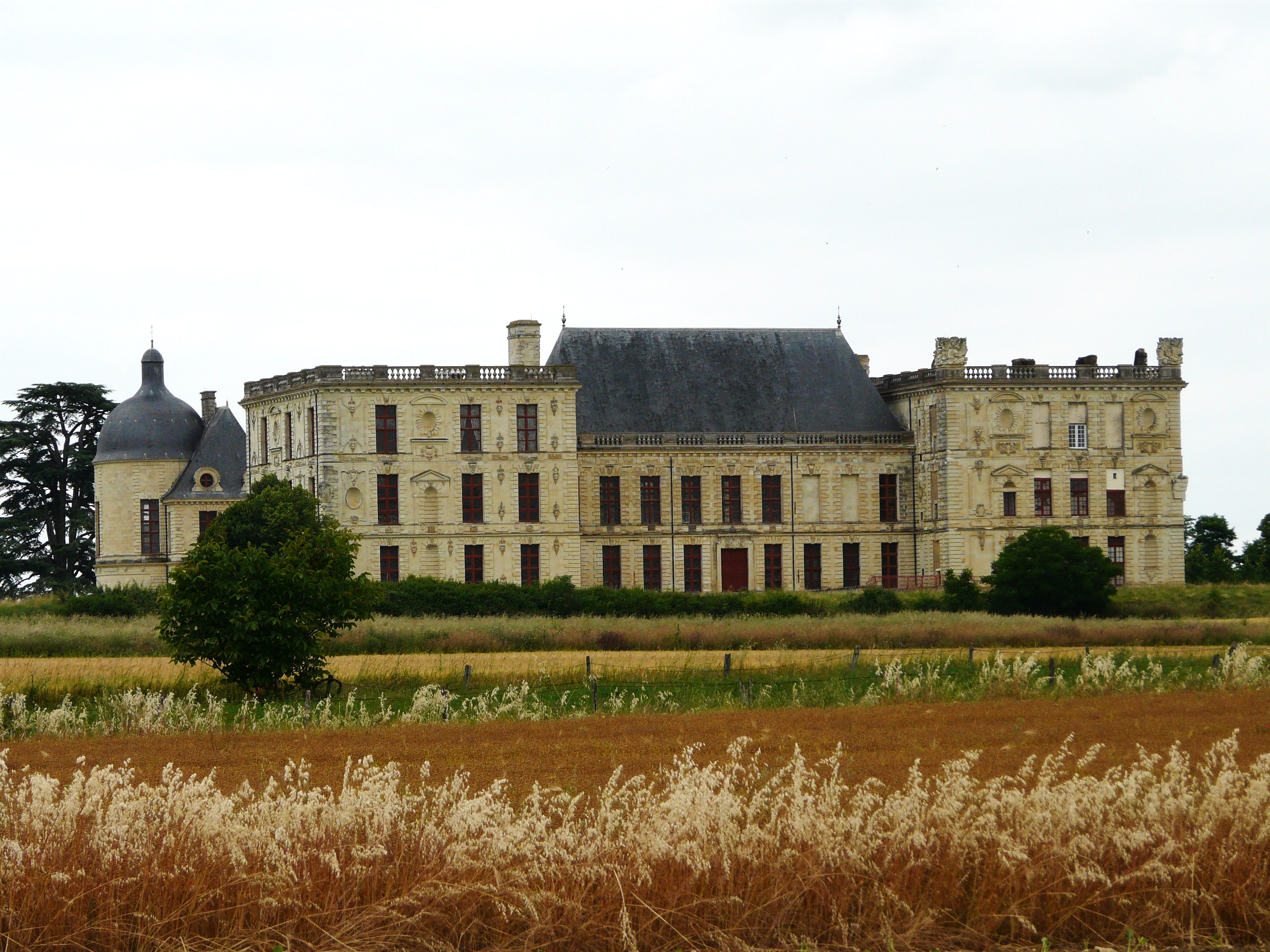
Back of the château

The Duc de La Feuillade's son sold the château to Louis XIV's mistress, Madame de Montespan, who lived there for the rest of her life. Her son had little interest in the property as he preferred to be much closer to the royal court so in 1736 he sold the château to the Duc de Villeroi. After that, the château went into severe decline and in 1793 was ransacked by Revolutionaries. For many years the château lay abandoned until the government of France took possession just before World War II eventually converting it to a museum.

Recognized worldwide, the museum is dedicated to contemporary art. In 1993, The Year of Solar Burns by conceptual artist Charles Ross was commissioned by the French Ministry of Culture for permanent installation in the Château d'Oiron. The château has been listed as a monument historique by the Ministry of Culture since 1923.

== See also ==
- List of castles in France
- Charles Perrault's Puss in Boots
