= Abbey of Saint-Jouin-de-Marnes =

Romanesque abbey in Saint-Jouin-de-Marnes, France

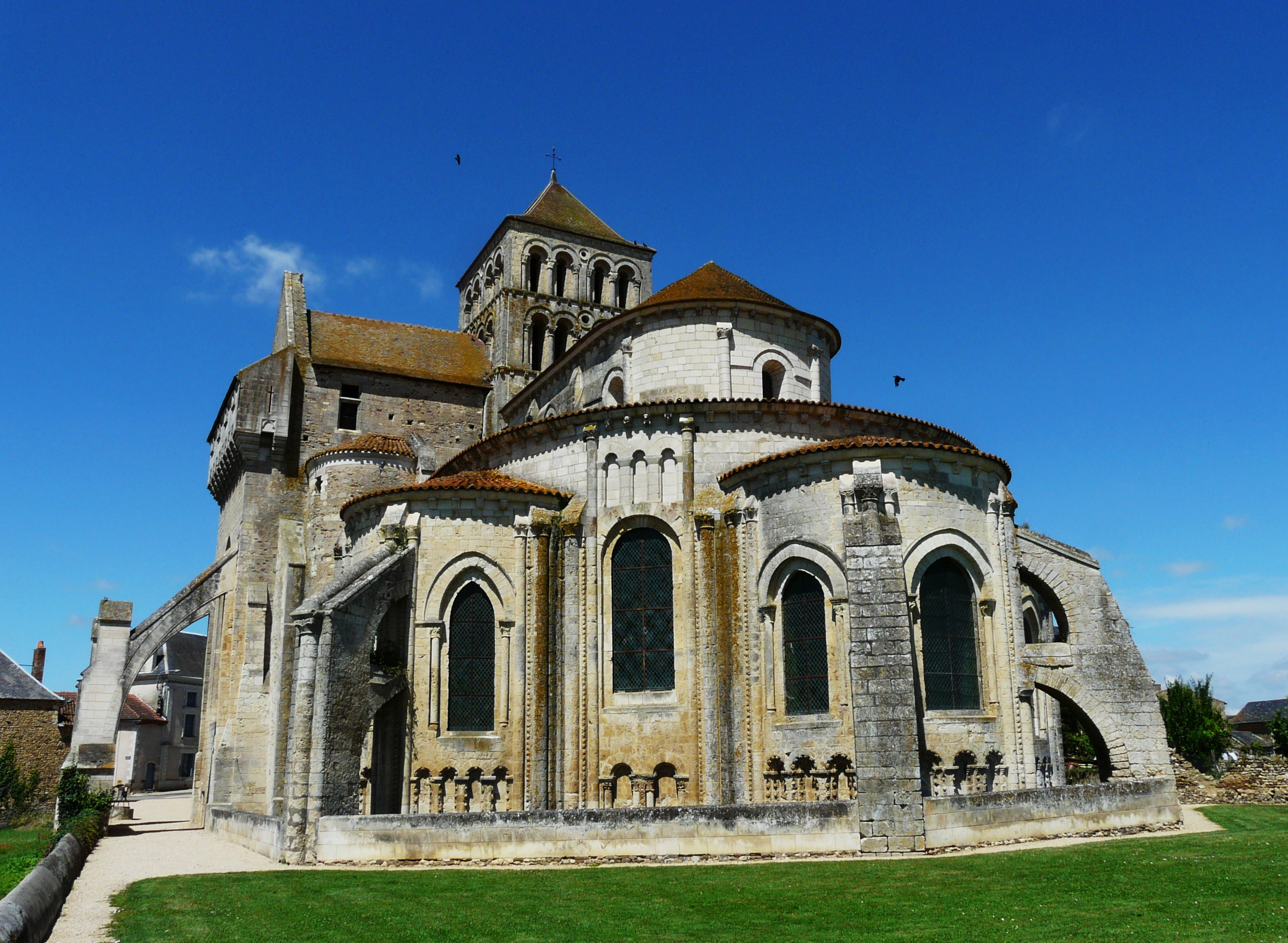
- The apse of the abbey church

Religion
- Affiliation: Roman Catholic
- Ecclesiastical or organizational status: Former abbey

Location
- Location: Saint-Jouin-de-Marnes, Deux-Sèvres, Nouvelle-Aquitaine, France
- Interactive map of Abbey of Saint-Jouin-de-Marnes
- Administration: Archdiocese of Poitiers
- Coordinates: 46.881699°N 0.051919°W

Architecture
- Style: Romanesque, Angevin Gothic
- Groundbreaking: 1095
- Completed: 1130

Website
- https://www.abbatiale-saintjouin-de-marnes.fr/

The Abbey of Saint-Jouin-de-Marnes is a historic abbey located in the commune of Saint-Jouin-de-Marnes in the Deux-Sèvres department of Nouvelle-Aquitaine, France. Its former abbey church, a masterpiece of Poitevin Romanesque architecture, stands as one of the region's most significant religious monuments. Originally known as Ensio during the Gallo-Roman period and later Ension, the abbey has played a pivotal role in the spread of Christianity in the area.

== History ==
=== 4th century ===
In the late 4th century, Jovinus (French: Saint Jouin), hailing from a wealthy family in Mouterre-Silly near Loudun, sought solitude in the forests of the region with a small group of disciples. His brother, Saint Maximin, was among the first archbishops of Trier. According to tradition, around 342, Jovinus established an oratory near Ensio. This oratory evolved into a monastery, initially named Ension, which later became Saint-Jouin-de-Marnes. Following the foundation of Ligugé Abbey by Saint Martin of Tours in 361, it became the second oldest monastery in France. Jovinus' preaching and benevolence led to his veneration, with his relics preserved in the monastery's Carolingian-era church.

=== 6th century ===
In the 6th century, Felix of Nantes, bishop of Nantes, urged Martin of Vertou to evangelize southern parts of his diocese and Poitou. Martin arrived at Ension, where he found an established monastic community and introduced the Rule of Saint Benedict to guide the monks' way of life.

=== 8th century ===
During the wars between Pepin the Short, Charlemagne, and Hunald I, Duke of Aquitaine, in the late 8th century, the monks fled the monastery due to conflicts in the region.

=== 9th century ===
The abbey escaped destruction during the Viking invasions of the early 9th century due to its inland location, away from navigable rivers. It became a cultural hub in Upper Poitou, offering refuge to monks from other monasteries, such as the abbey of Saint Martin of Vertou, who brought relics with them. In 843, after the Vikings withdrew due to Louis the Pious, the monks revitalized the monastery, reinstating the Rule of Saint Benedict. By 878, the Carolingian church was rebuilt, attracting pilgrims whose donations bolstered the abbey's prosperity.

=== 11th century ===
Located along the Via Turonensis, a major pilgrimage route to Santiago de Compostela, the abbey saw a surge in pilgrims during the 11th century, outgrowing its Carolingian church. Construction of a new abbey church began in 1095 under Raoul de La Futaie, a monk and reformer, and was completed by 1130, reflecting the abbey's growing wealth and influence.

=== 12th century ===
In 1100, Raoul became abbot, overseeing the completion of the abbey church by 1130. Its grand proportions and artistic features symbolized the abbey's prosperity. By 1179, the abbey held jurisdiction over 127 churches and their communities, establishing churches in Saint-Sébastien-sur-Loire, Nantes, Vertou, and Les Moutiers-en-Retz.

=== 13th century ===
The Romanesque barrel vaults of the nave and choir were replaced with Angevin Gothic vaults. Structural issues in the southeast choir area led to the addition of unsightly pillars to prevent collapse, altering the choir's harmonious proportions.

=== 14th and 15th centuries ===
During the Hundred Years' War, the region fell under English control between 1369 and 1374. In 1372, the English added a small bell tower to the south tower. Fortifications were expanded, including an elevated southern transept with machicolations and a large spiral staircase for defensive purposes. The abbey withstood attacks, and the region was reclaimed by Bertrand du Guesclin in the 1370s. In 1422, fortifications were further strengthened but sustained significant damage. The monastery was restored in 1447, and in 1467, Saint-Jouin-de-Marnes became a market town. In 1476, Pierre III d'Amboise rebuilt the monastery and cloister, though only the southern cloister gallery survives today.

=== 16th century ===
The French Wars of Religion (1562–1598) devastated the abbey. In February 1568, Protestant cavalry en route to the Battle of Moncontour looted and burned the monastery, destroying Saint Jovinus' relics. Further looting occurred in 1569.

=== 17th century ===
In 1655, the monks joined the Congregation of Saint-Maur, ushering in a period of prosperity. The abbey expanded northwest of the church, housing a painting school.

=== 18th century ===
Monastic life had declined by the mid-18th century. In 1755, the old conventual buildings were demolished and rebuilt, but the abbey lost its independence, falling under Amboise's administration. By 1770, it was largely abandoned. The French Revolution of 1789 ended monastic life, and the abbey was sold as national property, though the church was spared demolition and returned to worship in 1795.

=== 19th century ===
In the mid-19th century, Prosper Mérimée found the abbey in poor condition. His advocacy led to its preservation, and in 1862, the abbey church was designated a monument historique. Paintings, bells, and choir stalls also received protected status.

=== 20th and 21st centuries ===
Restoration, often interrupted, concluded in the mid-20th century. Today, the abbey church, southern cloister gallery, and private convent building remain well-preserved, reflecting its historical spiritual and economic significance. The former presbytery was listed as a historic monument on January 23, 2017.

== Architecture ==
The abbey church of Saint-Jouin-de-Marnes is a quintessential example of Poitevin Romanesque architecture, characterized by its robust forms, intricate sculptural decoration, and harmonious proportions. Constructed between 1095 and 1130, the church reflects the abbey's prosperity during the height of its influence as a pilgrimage stop along the Via Turonensis.

The church follows a Latin cross plan, typical of Romanesque ecclesiastical architecture, with a prominent nave, transept, and apse. The façade is a highlight, featuring a richly decorated portal adorned with carved reliefs depicting biblical scenes, including the Last Judgment and scenes from the life of Christ. These sculptures, executed with remarkable detail, are characteristic of the Poitevin style, which emphasizes narrative clarity and expressive figures.

The nave, originally covered with a Romanesque barrel vault, was modified in the 13th century with the introduction of Angevin Gothic ribbed vaults, a regional style known for its elegant, plant-like rib patterns. This alteration, while enhancing the interior's verticality, required the addition of reinforcing pillars in the choir due to structural weaknesses in the southeast section, slightly disrupting the original aesthetic harmony. The choir itself is surrounded by an ambulatory with radiating chapels, a common feature in pilgrimage churches designed to accommodate the circulation of pilgrims viewing relics.

The transept, particularly the southern arm, was fortified during the 14th century amid the Hundred Years' War. The addition of machicolations and a defensive upper level, accessible via a large spiral staircase, transformed this section into a fortified structure, reflecting the abbey's strategic role during regional conflicts. The crossing is surmounted by a robust bell tower, which provides a focal point for the church's exterior silhouette.

The cloister, rebuilt in 1476 by Pierre III d'Amboise, retains only its southern gallery, which connects to the church's north side. This gallery features simple Gothic arches, contrasting with the Romanesque grandeur of the church, and serves as a reminder of the abbey's later architectural evolution. The surviving convent buildings, expanded in the 17th century under the Congregation of Saint-Maur, include spaces used for a painting school, though these are now privately owned.

The abbey's architectural significance is further underscored by its designation as a monument historique in 1862, with additional protections for its choir stalls, paintings, and bells. Restoration efforts in the 20th century preserved the church's structural integrity and sculptural details, ensuring its status as a well-preserved example of Poitevin Romanesque art.

== Gallery ==
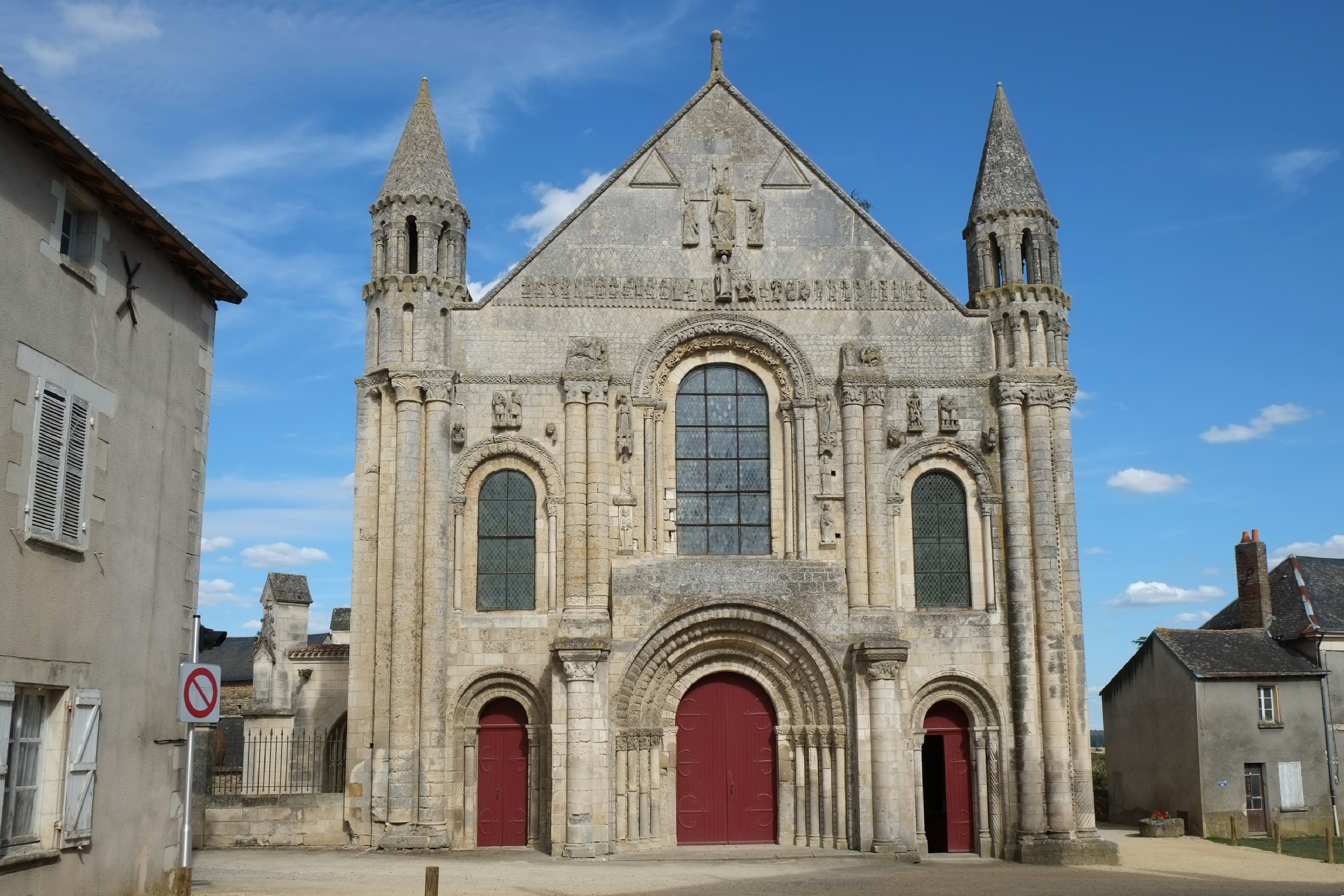
Façade of the abbey church.

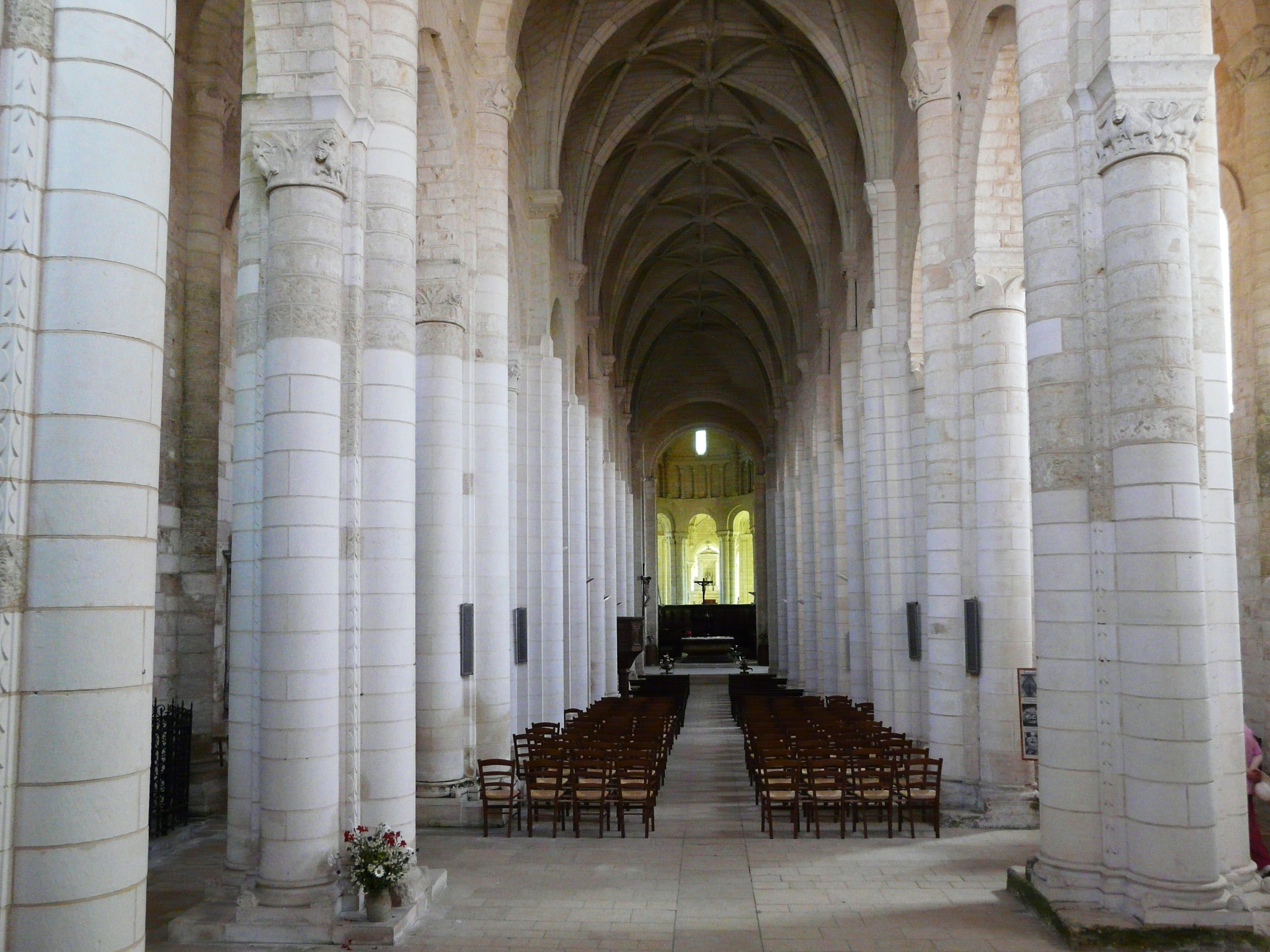
The nave.

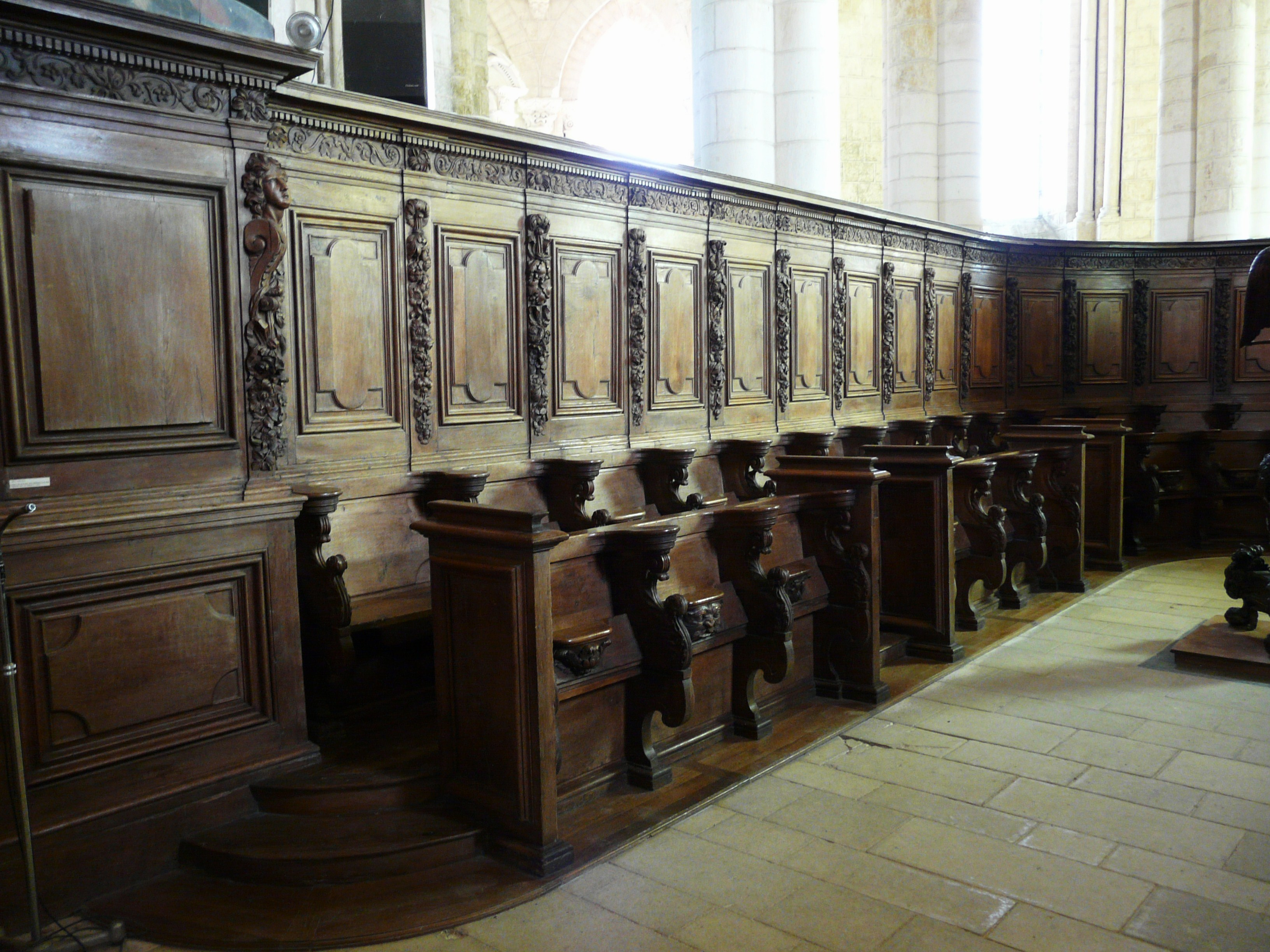
The choir stalls.

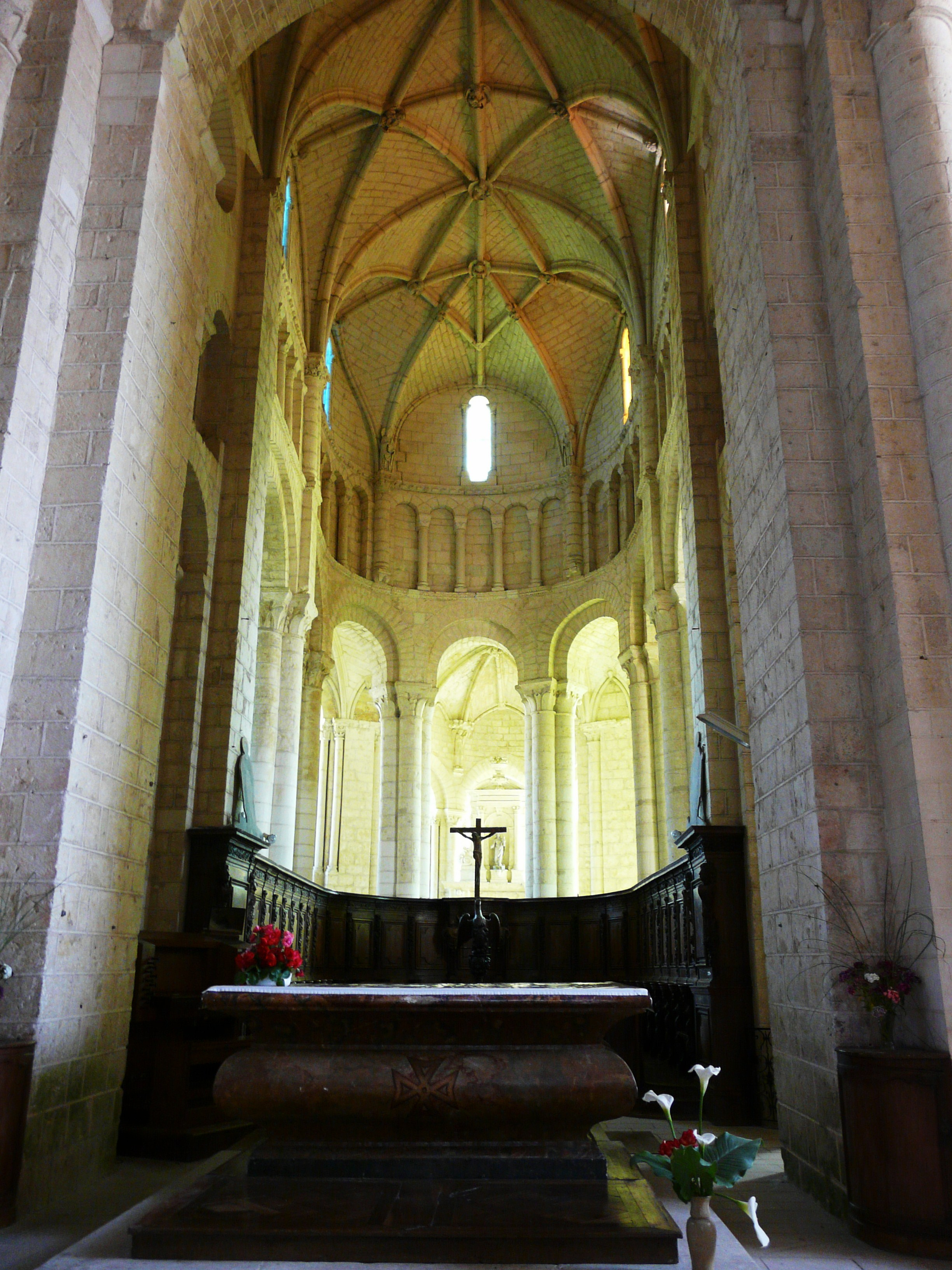
The choir.

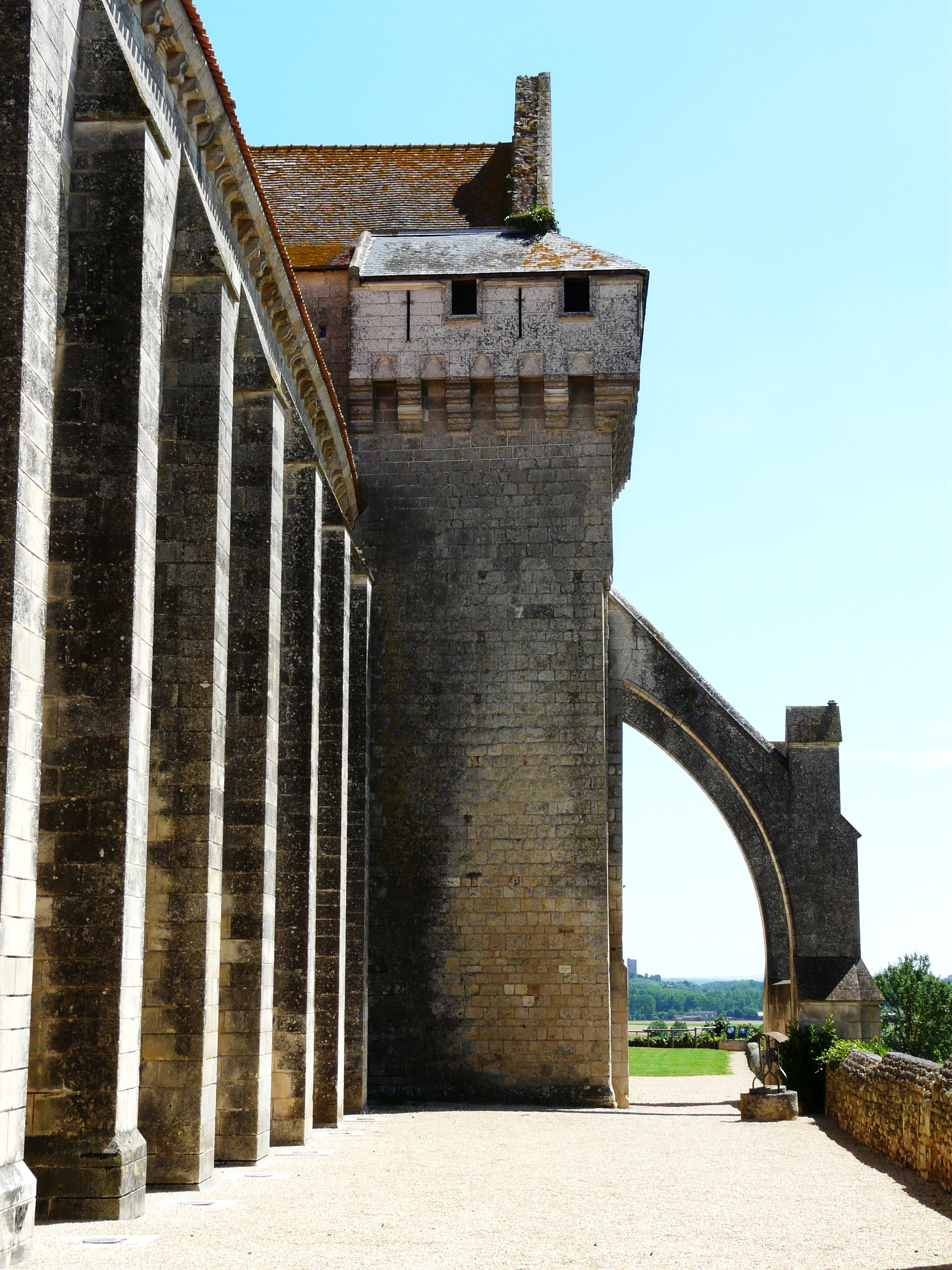
Southern transept buttresses.

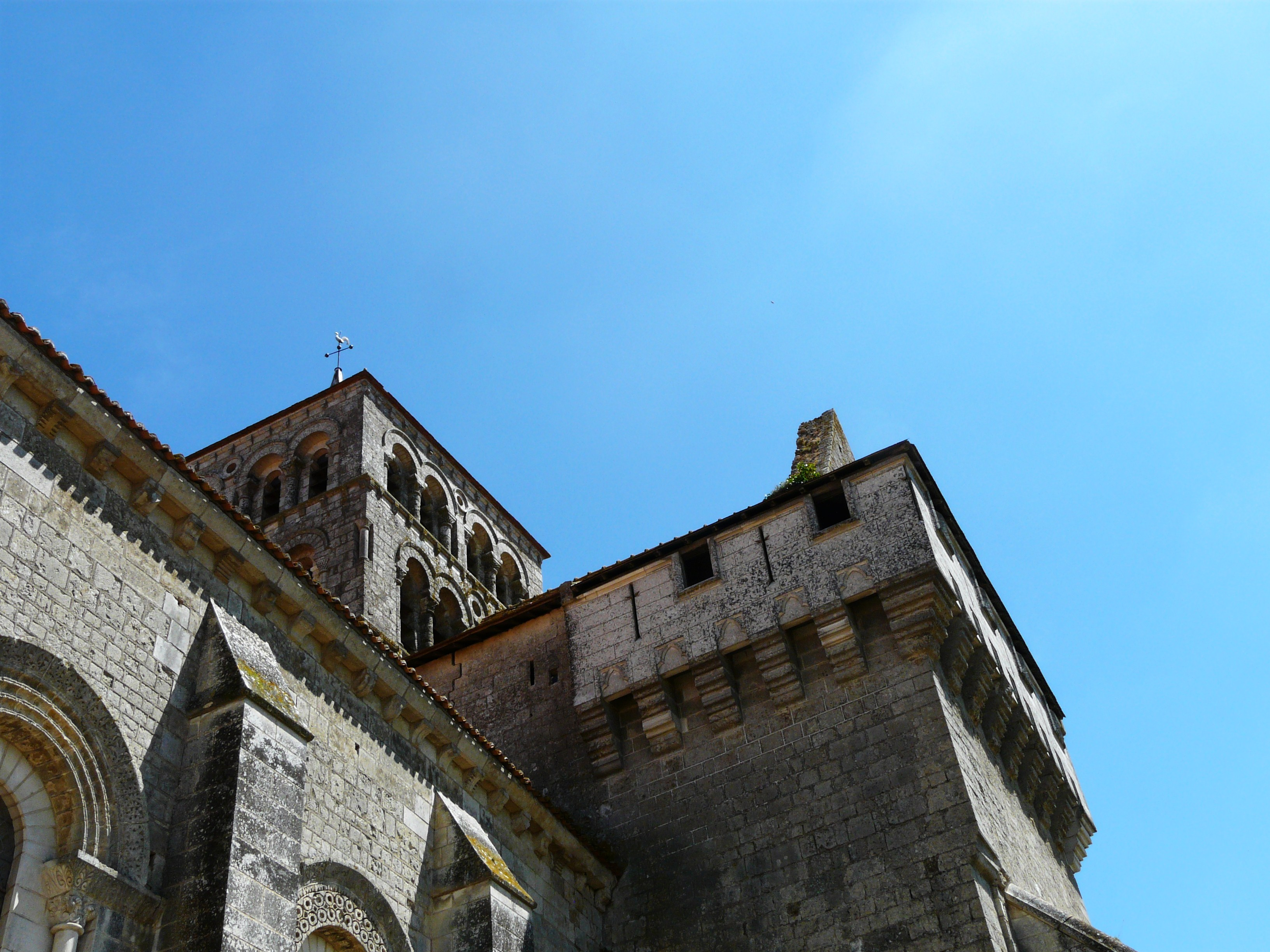
Bell tower above the crossing.

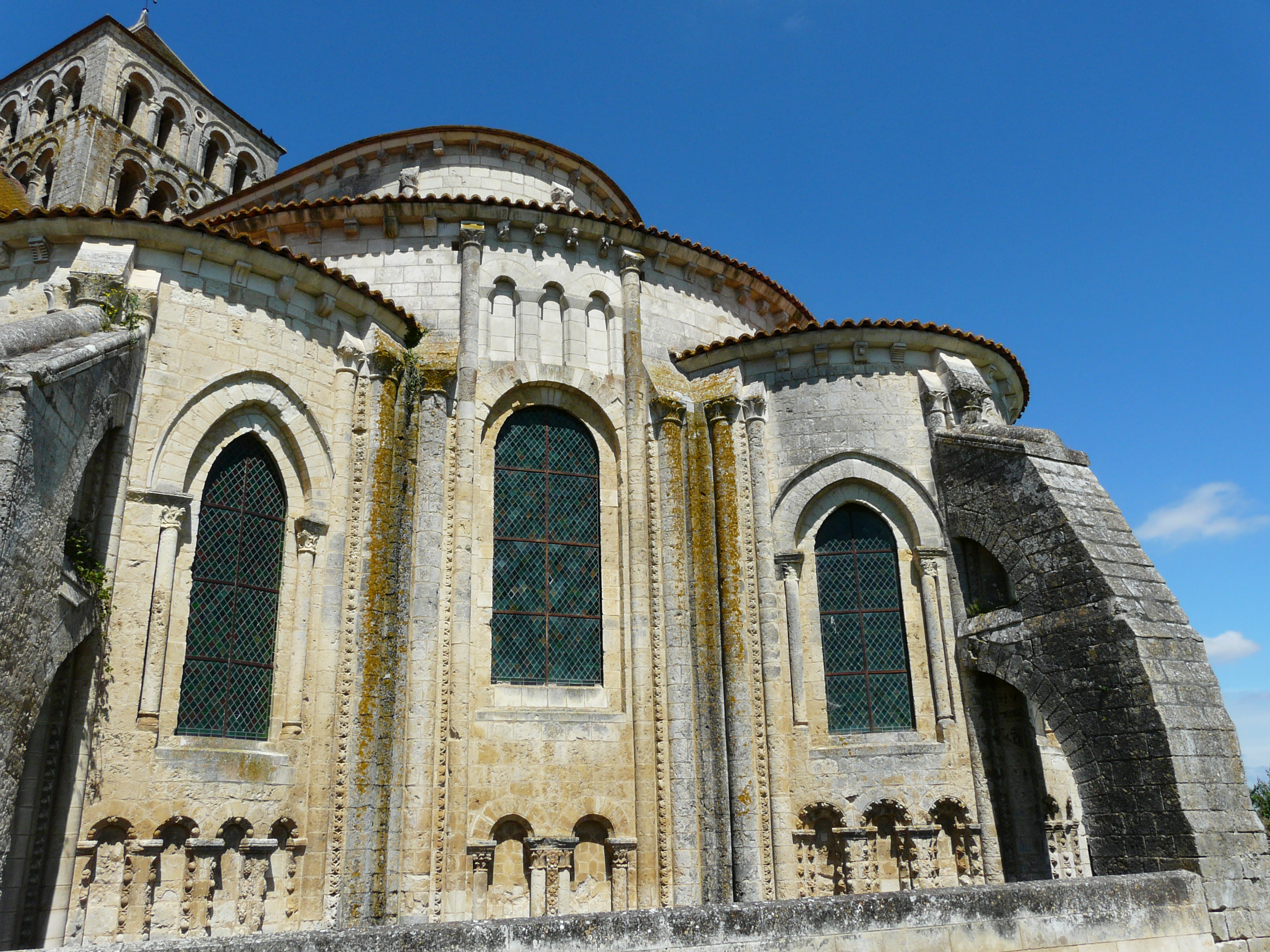
The apse and apsidal chapels.

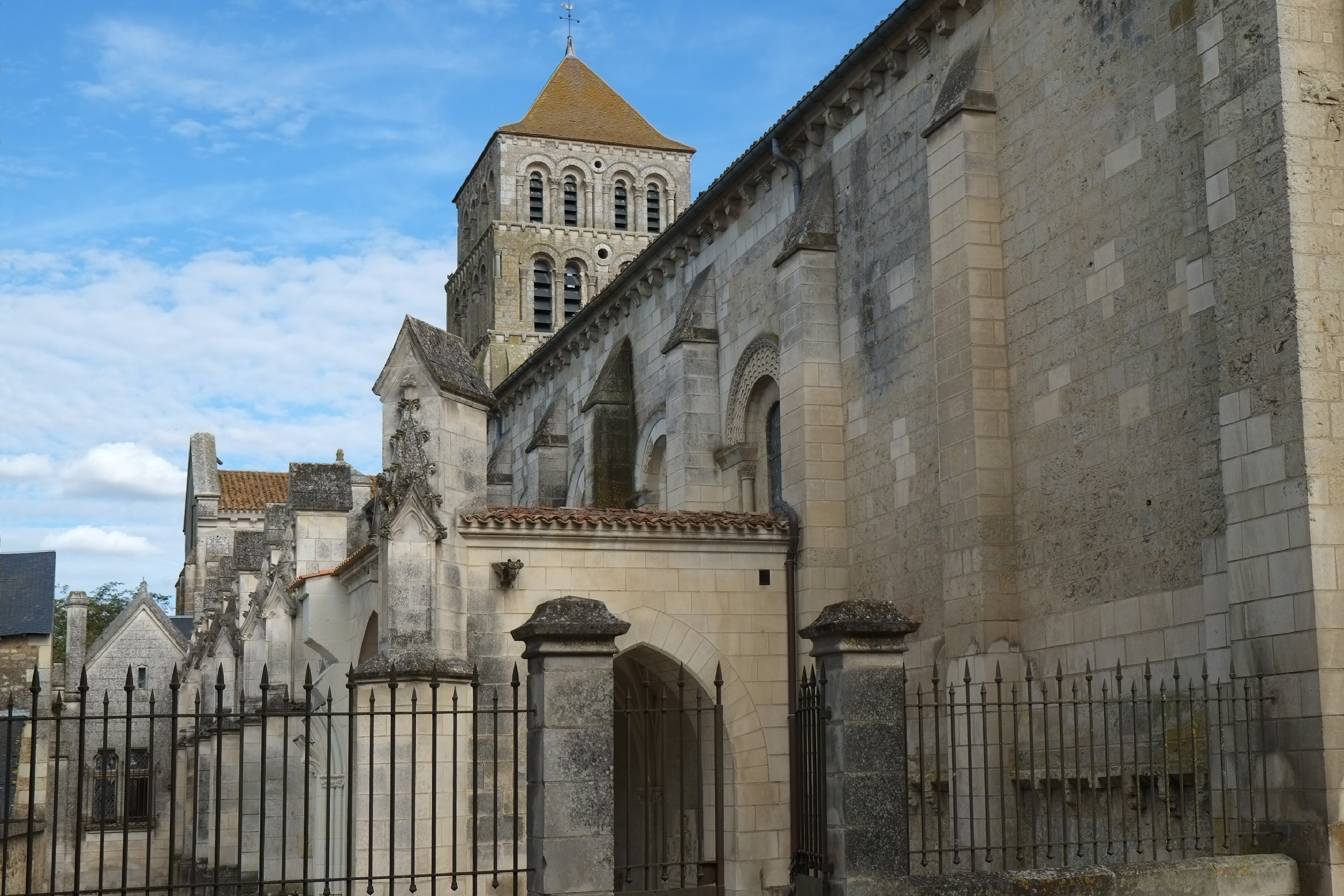
Northern side of the church.

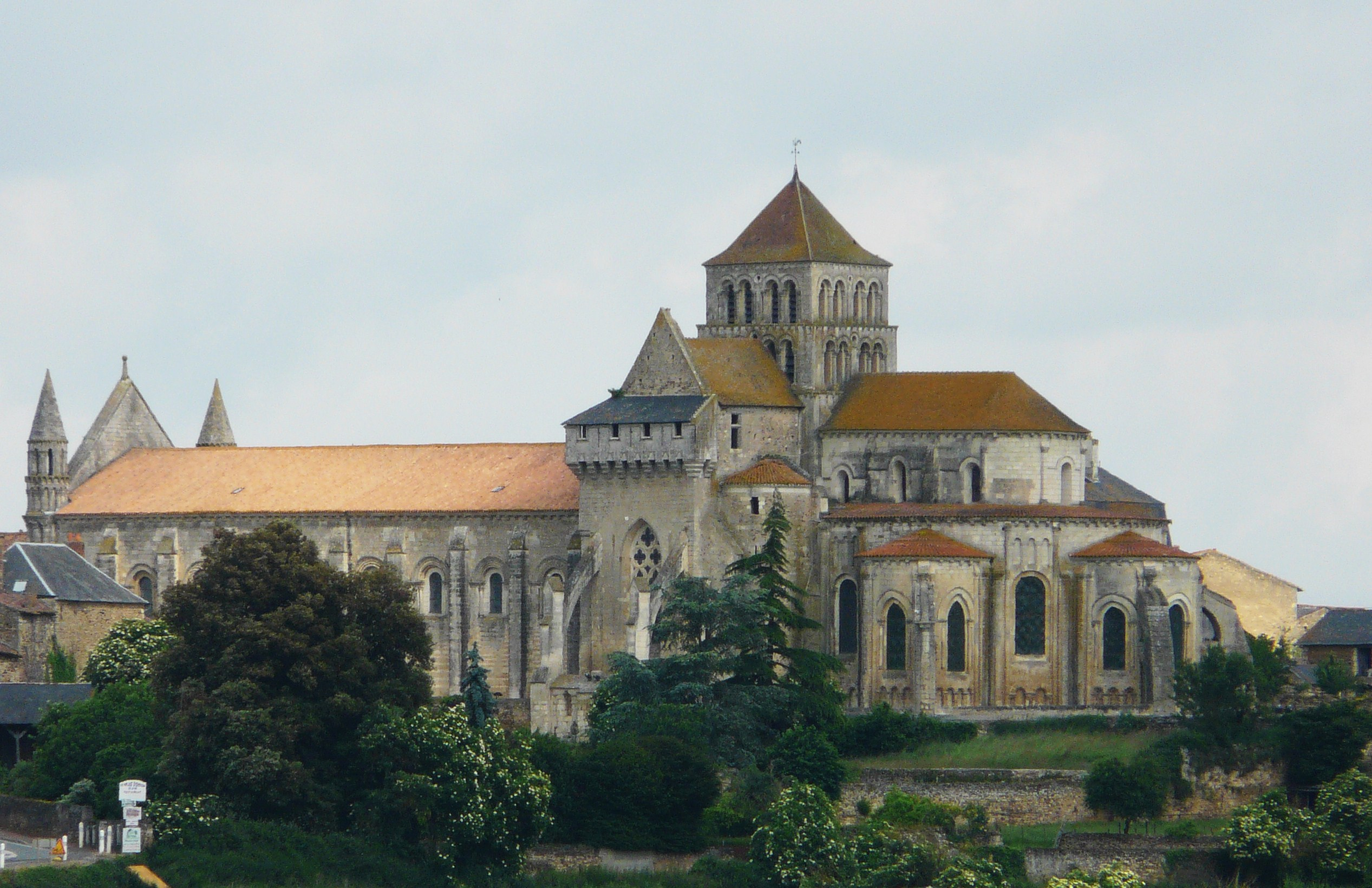
Southern side of the abbey.

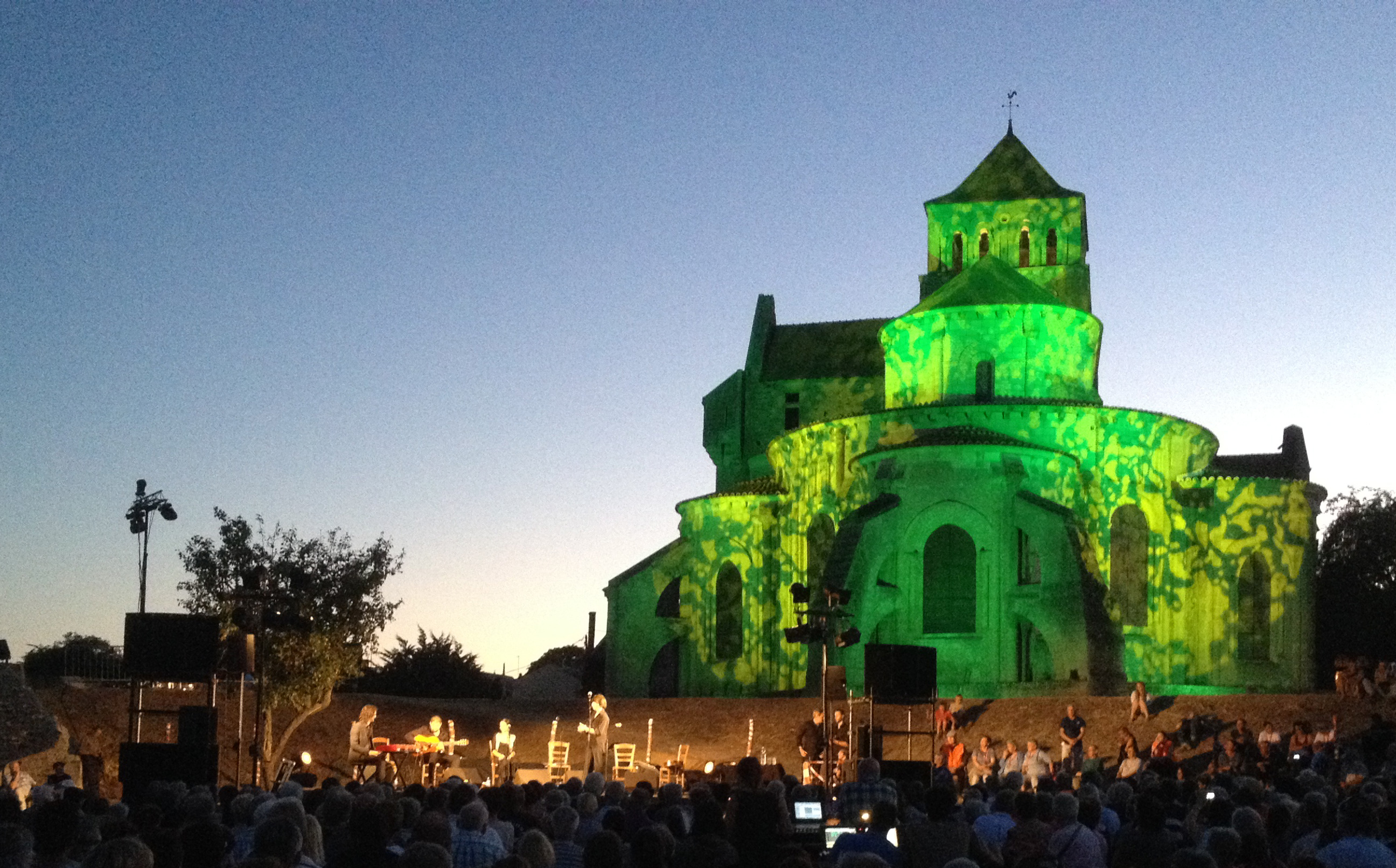
The abbey during a "Nuits romanes" concert.

== Abbots and Provosts ==
- 1000: Raoul
- 1070: Simon, also abbot of Saint-Martin de Vertou Abbey
- 1080: Brice, also abbot of Saint-Martin de Vertou
- Until 1516: Aymar Gouffier de Boisy

== Properties and income ==
- Prieuré de la Futaie
- Prieuré Saint-Jacques de Mont-Alboin
- Prieuré Saint-Nicolas-du-Roc
- Prieuré Saint-Étienne du Pallet
- In 1070, the rights to the Saint-Jean-Baptiste chapel (now Chapelle de Prigny) were transferred to the abbey, which established the Saint-Nicolas priory outside Prigny. The chapel became the parish church, but Prigny declined as its port silted up, while Les Moutiers grew. In the 17th century, the church received three altarpieces and a sacristy. The priory and its sanctuary were destroyed in 1730.

== See also ==
- Abbey
- Saint-Jouin-de-Marnes
- Angevin Gothic
- Roman Catholic Archdiocese of Poitiers
- Hundred Years' War
- French Wars of Religion
- Congregation of Saint-Maur
- Monument historique
- Saint Martin of Tours
- Carolingian architecture
- Rule of Saint Benedict

== Bibliography ==
- Chaussis, Gilbert (1988). La Mayenne de village en village [Mayenne from Village to Village] (in French). Vol. 2. Laval: Éditions Siloé. ISBN 2-905-259-13-2.
- Crozet, René (1971). Les églises romanes du Poitou [Romanesque Churches of Poitou] (in French). Paris: Éditions du Patrimoine. pp. 45–50. ISBN 978-2-85822-307-7.
- Durand, Georges (2004). Le monachisme en Poitou au Moyen Âge [Monasticism in Poitou in the Middle Ages] (in French). Rennes: Presses Universitaires de Rennes. ISBN 978-2-7535-0087-7.
- Favreau, Robert (2001). Histoire du Poitou et des Pays Charentais [History of Poitou and the Charente Regions] (in French). La Rochelle: Éditions Gérard Tissot. ISBN 978-2-902064-34-2.
- Vergnolle, Éliane (1994). L'art roman en France [Romanesque Art in France] (in French). Paris: Flammarion. ISBN 978-2-08-010762-6.
