= Oiron =

- Part of Plaine-et-Vallées
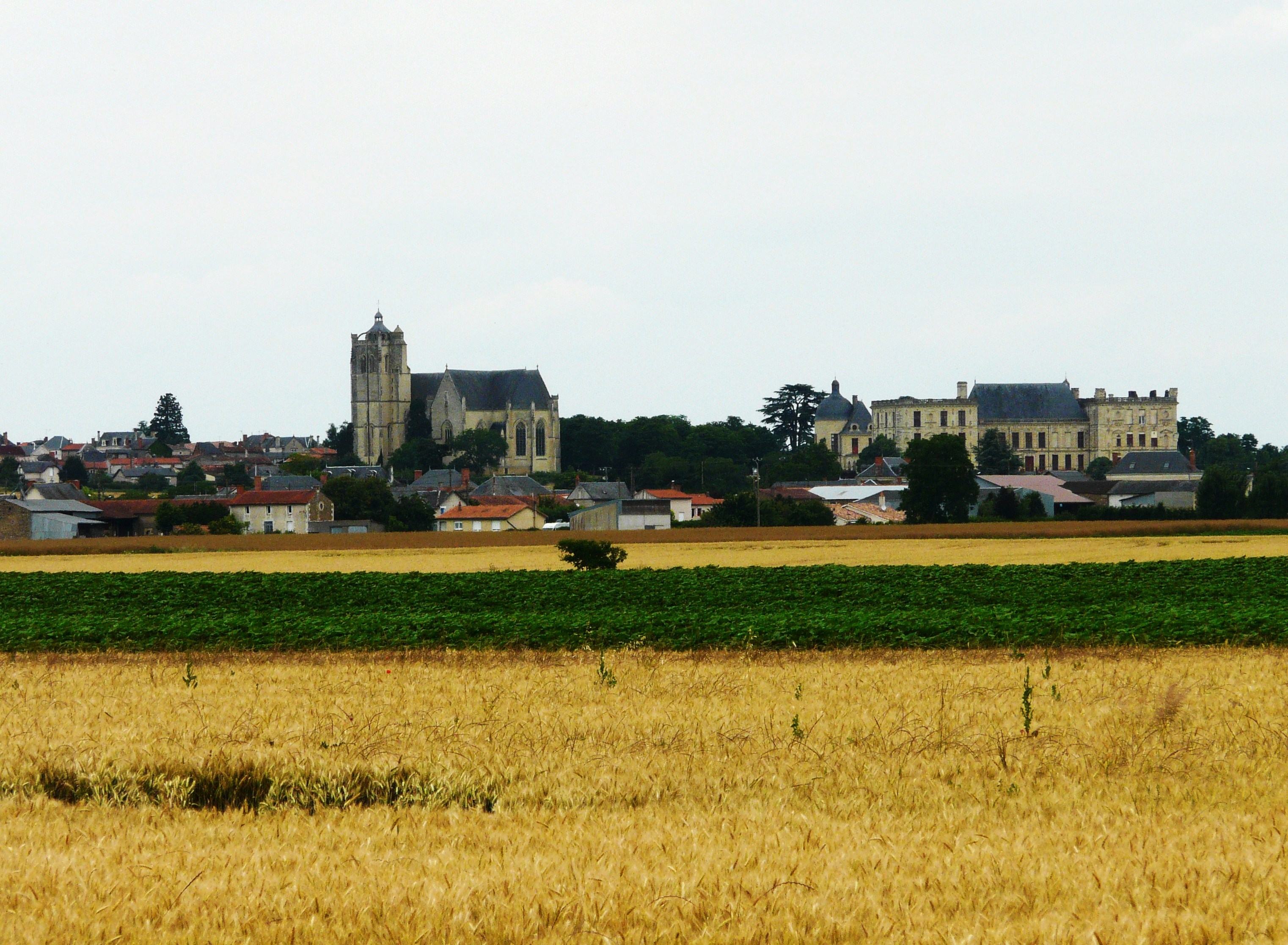
- A general view of Oiron
- Location of Oiron
- Location within France Location within Nouvelle-Aquitaine
- Coordinates: 46°57′07″N 0°04′49″W
- Country: France
- Region: Nouvelle-Aquitaine
- Department: Deux-Sèvres
- Arrondissement: Bressuire
- Canton: Le Val de Thouet
- Commune: Plaine-et-Vallées
- Area^{1}: 36.75 km^{2} (14.19 sq mi)
- Elevation: 88 m (289 ft)
- Highest elevation: 133 m (436 ft)
- Lowest elevation: 47 m (154 ft)
- Population (2022): 901
  - Density: 24.5/km^{2} (63.5/sq mi)
- Time zone: UTC+01:00 (CET)
  - Summer (DST): UTC+02:00 (CEST)
- Postal code: 79100
- ^{1} French Land Register data, which excludes lakes, ponds, glaciers > 1 km^{2} (0.386 sq mi or 247 acres) and river estuaries.

Oiron (French pronunciation: [waʁɔ̃]) is a former commune in the Deux-Sèvres department in western France. In January 1973 it absorbed the former communes Bilazais, Brie and Noizé. On 1 January 2019, it was merged into the new commune Plaine-et-Vallées.

The Château d'Oiron is located there.

== See also ==
- Communes of the Deux-Sèvres department
