= List of Benedictine monasteries in France =

This is a list of Benedictine monasteries, extant and non-extant, in the present territory of France. It includes both monks and nuns following the Rule of Saint Benedict, excluding the Cistercians, for whom see List of Cistercian monasteries in France. Some monasteries however belonged at various times in their histories to both the Benedictines and the Cistercians.

At different times these religious houses have formed various orders, congregations or groups, of which the main ones, as far as French monasteries are concerned, are the following:

- the Order of Cluny (Cluniacs)
- the Camaldolese (now within the Benedictine Confederation)
- the Olivetans (now within the Benedictine Confederation)
- the Celestines (now within the Benedictine Confederation)
- the Order of Chalais
- the Order of Fontevraud (Fontevristes)
- the Congregation of Tiron
- the Congregation of La Chaise-Dieu (Casadéens)
- the Congregation of Saint-Victor (Victorines)
- the Bursfelde Congregation
- the Alsace Congregation
- the Cassinese Congregation (now within the Benedictine Confederation)
- the Congregation of Chezal-Benoît
- the Congregation of the Exempts of Flanders
- the Congregation of the Exempts of France
- the Société de Bretagne
- the Congregation of St. Vanne (Vannistes)
- the Congregation of St. Maur (Mauristes)
- the English Benedictine Congregation in exile (1612–1791)
- the Congregation of the Allobroges
- the Affligem group
- the Solesmes Congregation (now within the Benedictine Confederation; formerly known as the Congrégation de France)
- the Subiaco Congregation (now within the Benedictine Confederation)
- the Fédération du Coeur Immaculé de Marie

The dates in brackets indicate the start and end dates of an abbey's status as a Benedictine monastery, which are not necessarily the same as the dates of its foundation or suppression. All religious houses in France were suppressed during the French Revolution, most of them in 1791. Some communities were revived, and many more new ones established, during the 19th century, but were forced to leave France by anti-clerical legislation during the 1880s (principally the Ferry Laws), and again in the first decades of the 20th century under the Association Act, 1901 (the Waldeck-Rousseau Law).

Abbeys and independent priories currently in operation are indicated by bold type.

Dependent priories are not generally noted in this list, except for a few unusually significant ones.

== A ==
- L'Absie Abbey (Abbaye de l'Absie-en-Gâtine), Diocese of La Rochelle (L'Absie-en-Gâtine, Deux-Sèvres)
- Abbey of L'Absie-en-Brignon, see Abbey of La Sie
- Ahun Abbey (Abbaye Saint-Étienne d'Ahun), monks, Diocese of Limoges (Moutier-d'Ahun, Creuse)
- Ainay Abbey (Abbaye Saint-Martin d'Ainay), monks, Diocese of Lyon (Ainay, Lyon)
- Alet Abbey (Abbaye d'Alet or Abbaye Sainte-Marie d'Alet), monks (Alet-les-Bains, Aude)
- Les Alleuds Abbey (Abbaye des Alleuds), monks, Diocese of Poitiers (Les Alleuds, Maine-et-Loire)
- Les Allois Abbey (Abbaye des Allois), nuns, Diocese of Limoges (La Geneytouse, Haute-Vienne)
- Almenêches Abbey (Abbaye Notre-Dame d'Almenêches), nuns, Diocese of Séez (transferred to Argentan in 1736) (Almenêches, Orne)
- Altorf Abbey (Abbaye d'Altorf), monks, Diocese of Strasbourg (Altorf, Bas-Rhin)
- Ambronay Abbey otherwise Ambournay Abbey (Abbaye Notre-Dame d'Ambronay or d'Ambournay), monks, Diocese of Lyon (803-1787) (Ambronay, Ain)
- Anchin Abbey (Abbaye d'Anchin), monks, Diocese of Arras (Pecquencourt, Nord)
- Andecy Abbey (Abbaye Notre-Dame d'Andecy), nuns, Diocese of Châlons-sur-Marne (Baye, Marne)
- Andernes Abbey (Abbaye d'Andernes), monks, Diocese of Boulogne-sur-Mer (Andernes near Guînes, Pas-de-Calais)
- Andlau Abbey (Abbaye d'Andlau), nuns, Diocese of Strasbourg (Andlau, Bas-Rhin)
- Angers (Maine-et-Loire), Diocese of Angers:
  - Abbaye Notre-Dame du Ronceray d'Angers, see Ronceray
  - Abbey of St Aubin, Angers (Abbaye Saint-Aubin d'Angers), monks, (966-?)
  - Abbey of St Nicholas, Angers (Abbaye Saint-Nicolas d'Angers) (1020-?)
  - Abbey of St. Sergius, Angers (Abbaye Saint-Serge d'Angers), monks
- Abbey of Saint-Pierre-les-Nonnains
- Angoulême (Charente), Diocese of Angoulême:
  - Abbey of St Ausonius, Angoulême (Abbaye Saint-Ausone d'Angoulême), nuns
  - Abbey of St Cybard, Angoulême (Abbaye Saint-Cybard d'Angoulême), monks
- Aniane Abbey (Abbaye Saint-Sauveur d'Aniane), monks, Diocese of Maguelonne, later Diocese of Montpellier (782-?) (Aniane, Hérault)
- Arcisses Abbey (Abbaye d'Arcisses), nuns, Diocese of Chartres (Arcisses in Brunelles, Eure-et-Loir)
- Argentan Abbey (Abbaye Notre-Dame d'Argentan), nuns (transferred from Almenêches 1736; dispersed during the French Revolution; reassembled at Vimoutiers in 1822; returned to Argentan in 1830 and 1958; refugees in Sées from 1944 to 1958) (Argentan, Orne)
- Argenteuil Abbey (Abbaye Notre-Dame d'Argenteuil), nuns (Argenteuil, Val-d'Oise)
- Abbey of St Caesarius, Arles (Abbaye Saint-Césaire d'Arles), nuns, Diocese of Arles (Arles, Bouches-du-Rhône)
- Abbey of St Mary, Arles-sur-Tech (Abbaye Sainte-Marie d'Arles-sur-Tech), monks, Diocese of Perpignan (Arles-sur-Tech, Pyrénées-Orientales)
- Arpajon Abbey (Abbaye Notre-Dame d'Arpajon), nuns, Diocese of Vabres although physically located within the territory of the Diocese of Rodez (Arpajon-sur-Cère, Cantal)
- Abbey of St Vaast, Arras (Abbaye Saint-Waast d'Arras), monks, Diocese of Arras (Arras, Pas-de-Calais)
- Artecelle Abbey, see La Celle Abbey
- Asnières Abbey (Abbaye Notre-Dame d'Asnières or Asnières-Bellay), monks, Diocese of Angers (1129-?) (Cizay-la-Madeleine, Maine-et-Loire)
- Auchy Abbey otherwise Aumale Abbey (Abbaye d'Auchy or Saint-Martin d'Auchy or d'Aumale), monks, Diocese of Rouen (Aumale, Seine-Maritime

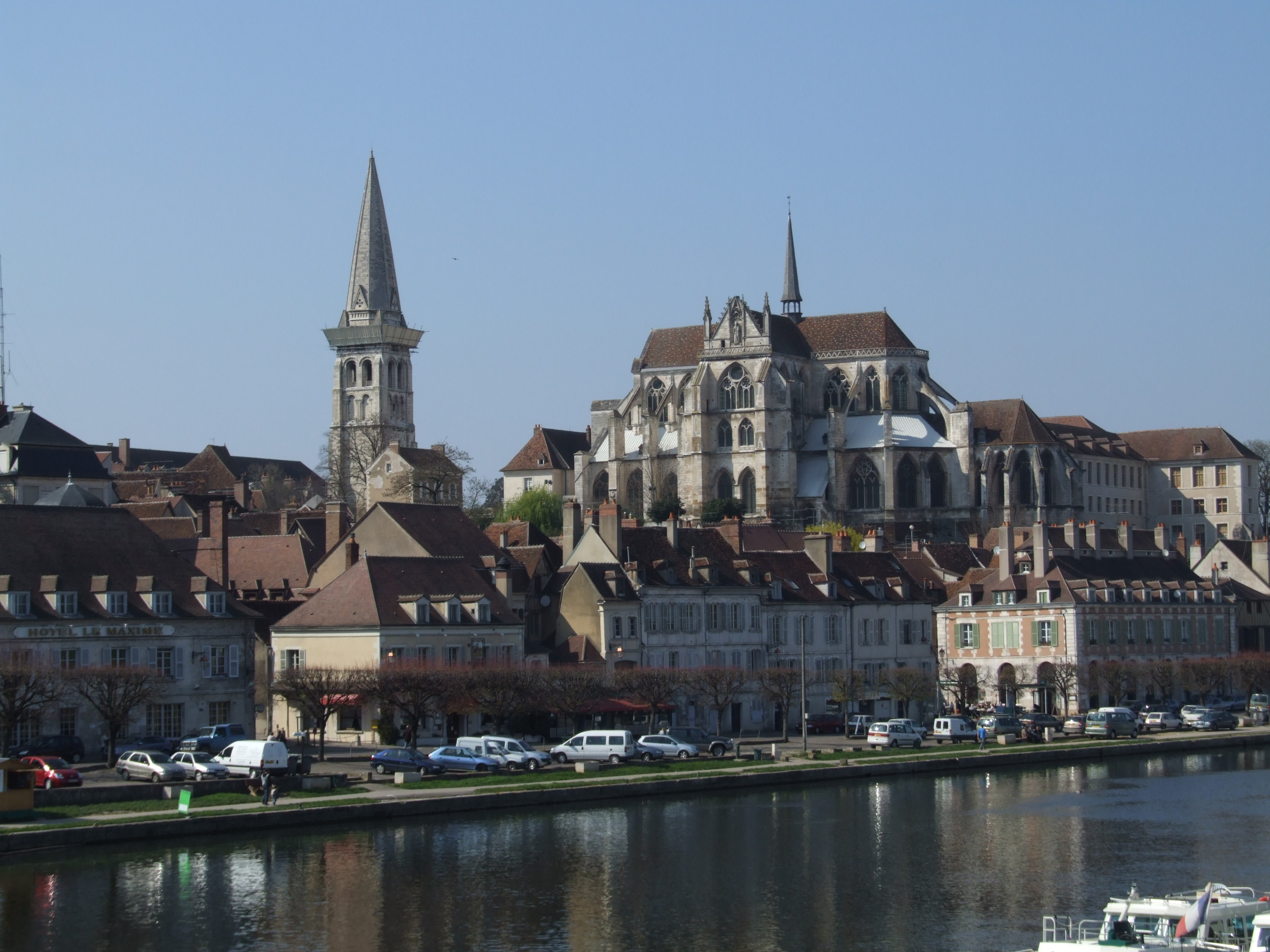
Saint-Germain d'Auxerre

- Auchy Abbey (Abbaye d'Auchy-les-Moines), monks, Diocese of Boulogne-sur-Mer (Auchy-lès-Hesdin, formerly known as Auchy-les-Moines, Pas-de-Calais)
- Aumale Abbey, see Auchy Abbey
- Aurillac Abbey (Abbaye d'Aurillac), monks, Diocese of Clermont (about 896-1561) (Aurillac, Cantal)
- Autun (Saône-et-Loire), Diocese of Autun:
  - Abbey of St. Andoche, Autun (Abbaye Saint-Andoche d'Autun), nuns
  - Abbey of Saint-Jean-le-Grand (Abbaye Saint-Jean-le-Grand d'Autun), nuns
  - Abbey of St. Martin, Autun (Abbaye de Saint-Martin d'Autun), monks
  - Abbey of St. Symphorian, Autun (Abbaye de Saint-Symphorien d'Autun), monks
- Auxerre (Yonne), Diocese of Auxerre:
  - Abbey of Saint-Germain d'Auxerre (Abbaye Saint-Germain d'Auxerre), monks
  - Abbey of St. Marianus, Auxerre (Abbaye Saint-Marien d'Auxerre), monks
- Avenay Abbey (Abbaye d'Avenay), nuns, Diocese of Reims (Avenay-Val-d'Or, Marne)
- Avesnes Abbey (Abbaye Notre-Dame d'Avesnes), nuns, Diocese of Arras (Avesnes, Pas-de-Calais)
- Avignon (Vaucluse), Diocese of Avignon:
  - Abbey of St Andrew, Avignon (Abbaye de Saint-André-lès-Avignon), monks, attributed to the Diocese of Orange
  - Abbey of St Laurence, Avignon (Abbaye Saint-Laurent d'Avignon), nuns

== B ==
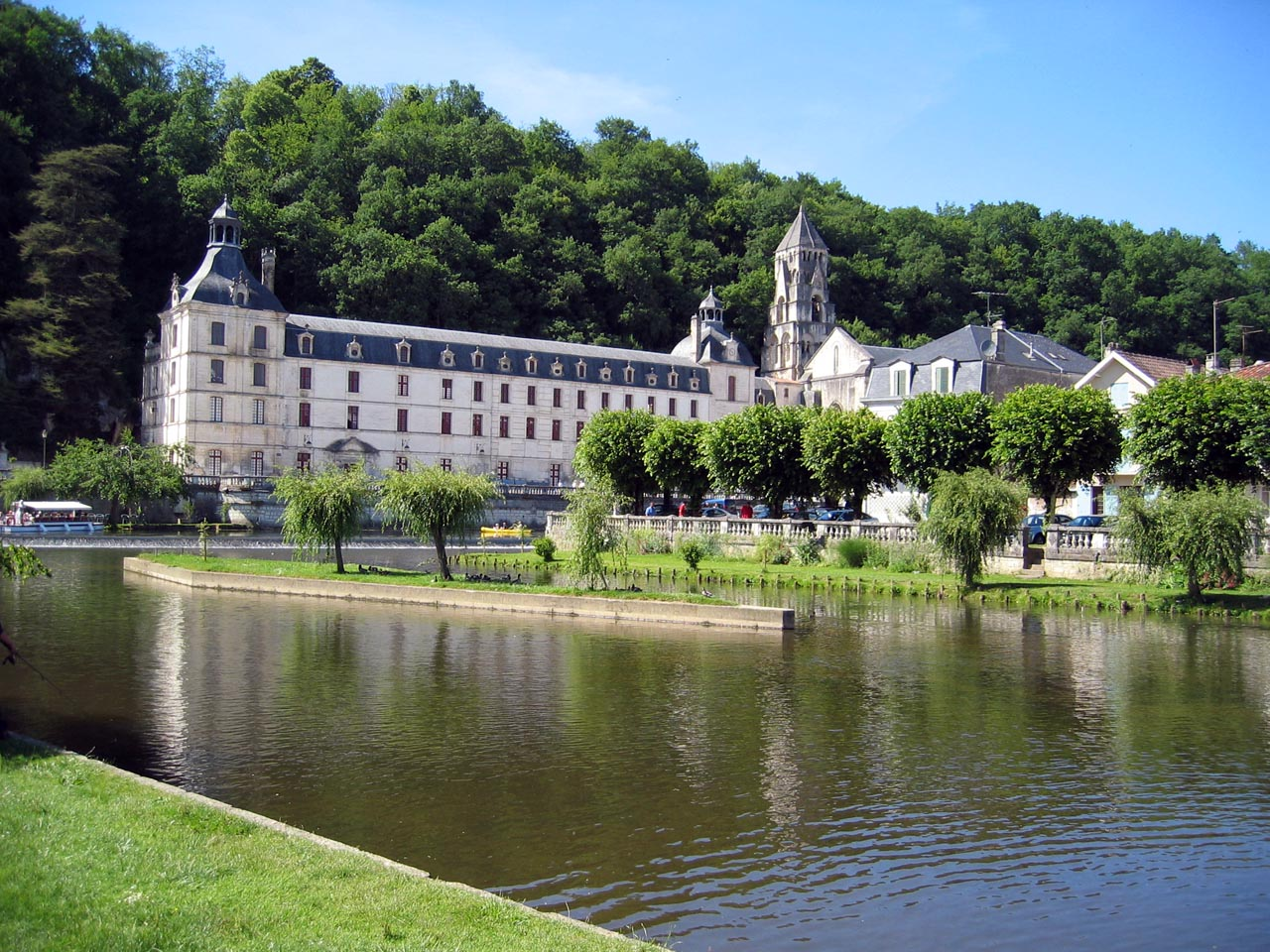
Brantôme Abbey

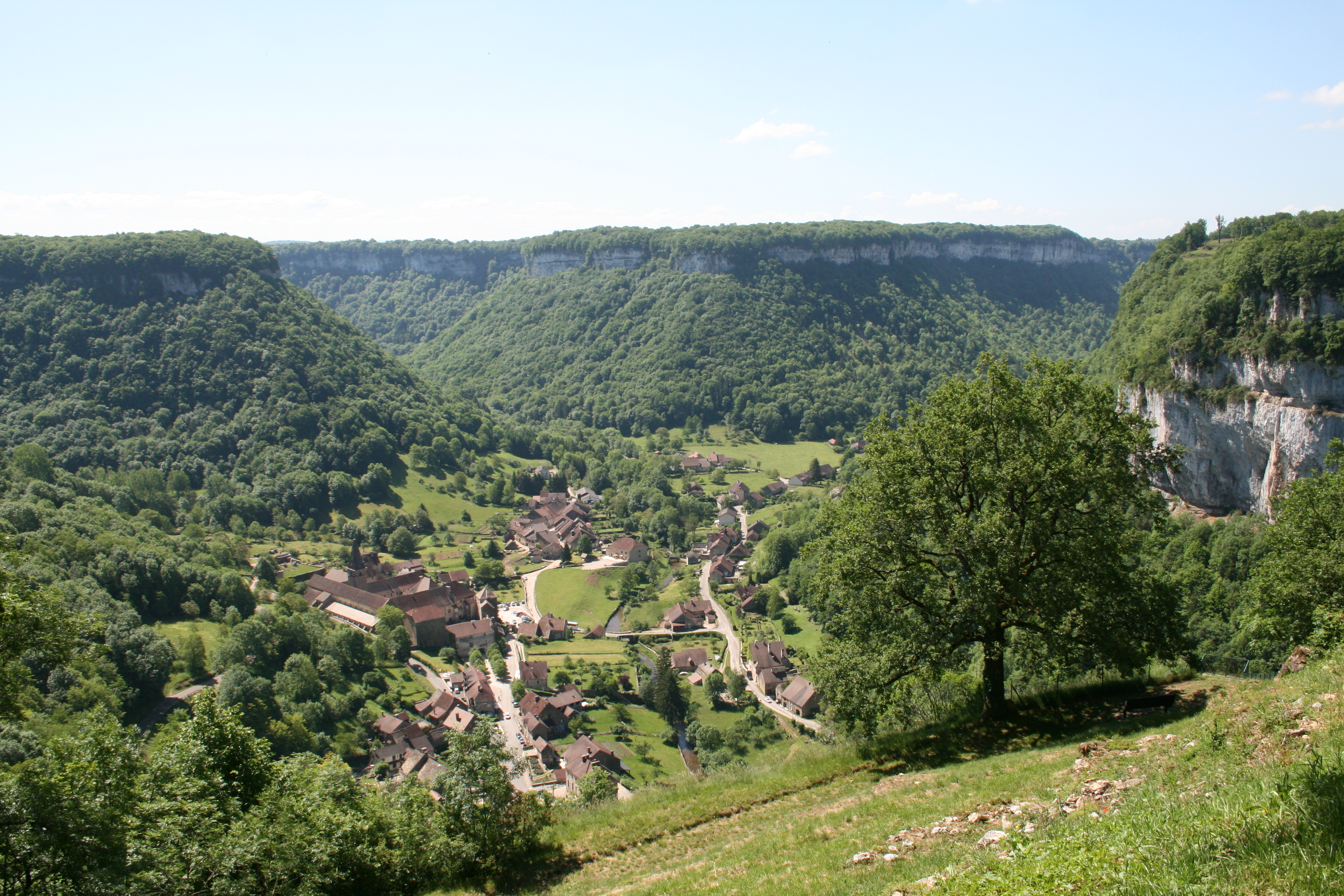
Baume Abbey

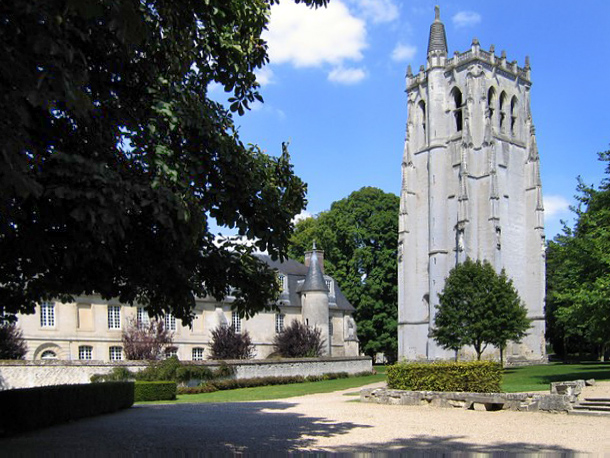
Bec Abbey

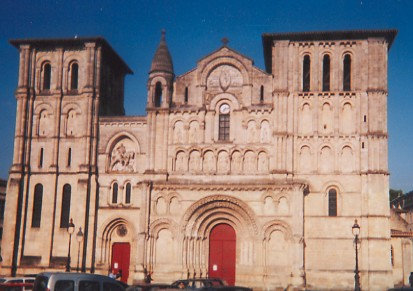
St. Cross Abbey, Bordeaux

- Baignes Abbey otherwise Baigne Abbey (Abbaye Saint-Étienne de Baignes or Baigne), monks, Diocese of Saintes (Baignes-Sainte-Radegonde, Charente)
- Le Barroux (Vaucluse):
  - Abbey of Our Lady of the Annunciation, Le Barroux (Abbaye Notre-Dame de l'Annonciation du Barroux), nuns
  - Le Barroux Abbey otherwise Abbey of St Madeleine, Le Barroux (Abbaye Sainte-Madeleine du Barroux), monks (founded 1978, raised to status of abbey in 1989)
- Bassac Abbey (Abbaye Saint-Étienne de Bassac), monks, Diocese of Saintes (?-1790) (Bassac, Charente)
- Baume-les-Dames Abbey (Abbaye de Baume-les-Dames, Abbaye Sainte-Odile), nuns, Diocese of Besançon (Baume-les-Dames, Doubs)
- Baume Abbey (Abbaye Saint-Pierre et Saint-Paul de Baume-les-Messieurs or Baume-les-Moines), monks, Diocese of Besançon, later Diocese of Saint-Claude (Baume-les-Messieurs, Jura) (later became Cistercian)
- Beaulieu-lès-Loches Abbey (Abbaye Sainte-Trinité de Beaulieu), monks, Diocese of Tours (Beaulieu-lès-Loches, Indre-et-Loire)
- Beaulieu-en-Argonne Abbey (Abbaye Saint-Sauveur et Saint-Maurice de Beaulieu), monks, Diocese of Verdun (Beaulieu-en-Argonne, Meuse)
- Beaulieu-sur-Dordogne Abbey (Abbaye Saint-Pierre et Saint-Paul de Beaulieu or Abbaye Saint-Pierre, Saint-Paul et Sainte-Félicité de Beaulieu), Diocese of Limoges, in the Limousin (Beaulieu-sur-Dordogne, Corrèze)
- Beaumont Abbey (Abbaye Saint-Pierre de Beaumont), nuns, Diocese of Clermont (Beaumont, Puy-de-Dôme)
- Beaumont-lès-Tours Abbey (Abbaye de Beaumont-lès-Tours), nuns, Diocese of Tours (Beaumont-lès-Tours, Indre-et-Loire)
- Abbey of St Lucian, Beauvais (Abbaye Saint-Lucien de Beauvais), monks, Diocese of Beauvais (Beauvais, Oise)
- Bec Abbey (Abbaye Notre-Dame du Bec), monks (Olivetans since 1948), Diocese of Rouen (Le Bec-Hellouin, Eure)
- Bellaigue Abbey (Abbaye Notre-Dame de Bellaigue), monks (Virlet, Puy-de-Dôme)
- Bellecelle Abbey (Abbaye de Bellecelle), Archdiocese of Albi (Castres, Tarn)
- Bellefontaine Abbey (Abbaye de Bellefontaine), Diocese of La Rochelle (Bégrolles-en-Mauges, Maine-et-Loire)
- Belloc Abbey (Abbaye Notre-Dame de Belloc) (Urt, Pyrénées-Atlantiques)
- Bergues Abbey (Abbaye de Bergues-Saint-Winoc), monks, Diocese of Ypres (Bergues, Nord)
- Bernay Abbey (Abbaye Notre-Dame de Bernay), monks, Diocese of Lisieux (Bernay, Eure)
- Berteaucourt Abbey or Bertaucourt Abbey (Abbaye de Berteaucourt, Abbaye Notre-Dame de Berteaucourt-les-Dames; also Bertaucourt), nuns, Diocese of Amiens (Berteaucourt-les-Dames, Somme)
- Abbey of St Vincent, Besançon (Abbaye Saint-Vincent de Besançon), monks, Diocese of Besançon (Besançon, Doubs)
- Bèze Abbey (Abbaye Saint-Pierre, Saint-Paul de Bèze), monks (Bèze, Côte-d'Or)
- Biblisheim Abbey (Abbaye de Biblisheim), nuns, Diocese of Strasbourg (Biblisheim, Bas-Rhin)
- Abbaye des Blancs-Manteaux ("Abbey of the White Cloaks"), monks, Diocese of Paris (Rue des Blancs-Manteaux, 4th arrondissement, Paris) (Servites 1258-74; Williamites 1298-1610; Benedictines 1618-1790; this was the first seat of the Congregation of Saint-Maur)
- Blangy Abbey (Abbaye de Blangy), monks, Diocese of Boulogne-sur-Mer (Blangy-sur-Ternoise, Pas-de-Calais)
- Blasimont Abbey otherwise Blâmont Abbey (Abbaye de Blasimont or Blâmont), monks, Diocese of Bazas (Blasimon, Gironde)
- Blaye Abbey (Abbaye Saint-Sauveur de Blaye), monks, Diocese of Bordeaux (Blaye, Gironde)
- Blesle Abbey (Abbaye Saint-Pierre de Blesle), nuns, Diocese of Clermont (849-1789) (Blesle, Haute-Loire)
- Abbey of St Laumer, Blois (Abbaye Saint-Laumer de Blois), Diocese of Chartres later Diocese of Blois (Blois, Loir-et-Cher)
- Bois-Aubry Abbey (Abbaye de Bois-Aubry), monks, Diocese of Tours (Luzé, Indre-et-Loire)
- Bonnesaigne Abbey (Abbaye de Bonnesaigne), nuns, Diocese of Limoges (Combressol, Corrèze)
- Bonneval Abbey (Abbaye de Bonneval, Abbaye Saint-Florentin or Abbaye Saint-Florentin et Saint-Hilaire de Bonneval), monks, Diocese of Chartres (Bonneval, Eure-et-Loir)
- Bonneval-lès-Thouars Abbey (Abbaye de Bonneval-lès-Thouars), nuns, Diocese of Poitiers (Saint-Jean-de-Thouars, Deux-Sèvres)
- Bon-Secours Priory (Prieuré Notre-Dame-de-Bon-Secours), nuns (1648-1790), Diocese of Paris (Rue de Charonne and Impasse Bon-Secours, 11th arrondissement, Paris)
- St Cross Abbey, Bordeaux (Abbaye Sainte-Croix de Bordeaux), monks, Diocese of Bordeaux (Bordeaux, Gironde)
- Boscherville Abbey (Abbaye Saint-Georges de Boscherville), monks, Diocese of Rouen (Saint-Martin-de-Boscherville, Seine-Maritime)
- Boscodon Abbey otherwise Boscaudon Abbey (Abbaye Notre-Dame de Boscodon or Boscaudon), monks, Diocese of Embrun (near Crots, Hautes-Alpes)
- Bourbourg Abbey (Abbaye de Bourbourg), nuns, Diocese of Saint-Omer (Bourbourg, Nord)
- Bourg-Dieu Abbey, see Déols Abbey
- Bourges (Cher), Diocese of Bourges:
  - Abbey of St Laurence, Bourges (Abbaye Saint-Laurent de Bourges), nuns
  - Abbey of St Sulpicius, Bourges (Abbaye Saint-Sulpice de Bourges)
- Bourgueil Abbey (Abbaye Saint-Pierre de Bourgueil-en-Vallée), monks, Diocese of Angers, Anjou (991-1791) (Bourgueil, Indre-et-Loire)
- Bouxières Abbey (Abbaye de Bouxières-aux-Dames), nuns, Diocese of Nancy (Bouxières-aux-Dames, Meurthe-et-Moselle)
- Bouzonville Abbey (Abbaye Sainte-Croix de Bouzonville), monks, Diocese of Metz (Bouzonville, Moselle)
- Bouzy-la-Forêt Abbey (Abbaye de Bouzy-la-Forêt), nuns (Bouzy-la-Forêt, Loiret)
- Brageac Abbey (Abbaye Notre-Dame de Brageac), nuns, Diocese of Clermont (Brageac, Cantal)
- Brantôme Abbey (Abbaye Saint-Pierre de Brantôme or Abbaye Saint-Sicaire de Brantôme), monks, Diocese of Périgueux (Brantôme, Dordogne)
- Breteuil Abbey (Abbaye de Breteuil), monks, Diocese of Beauvais (Breteuil, aka Breteuil-sur-Noye, Oise)
- Breuil-Herbaud Abbey (Abbaye du Breuil-Herbaud), Diocese of Luçon (Falleron, Vendée)
- Bricoeil Abbey (Abbaye de Bricoeil; also known as Notre-Dame de Sésanne), nuns, Diocese of Troyes (Sézanne, Haute-Marne)
- Brienne Abbey (Abbaye de Brienne-lès-Anse), nuns, Diocese of Lyon (Anse, Rhône)
- Brignon Abbey, see Abbey of La Sie
- Le Bugue Abbey (Abbaye Saint-Sauveur du Bugue), nuns, Diocese of Périgueux (Le Bugue, Dordogne)
- Buis Abbey or Buix Abbey (Abbaye Saint-Croix de Buis or Buix), nuns, Diocese of Saint-Flour (near Aurillac, Cantal)

== C ==
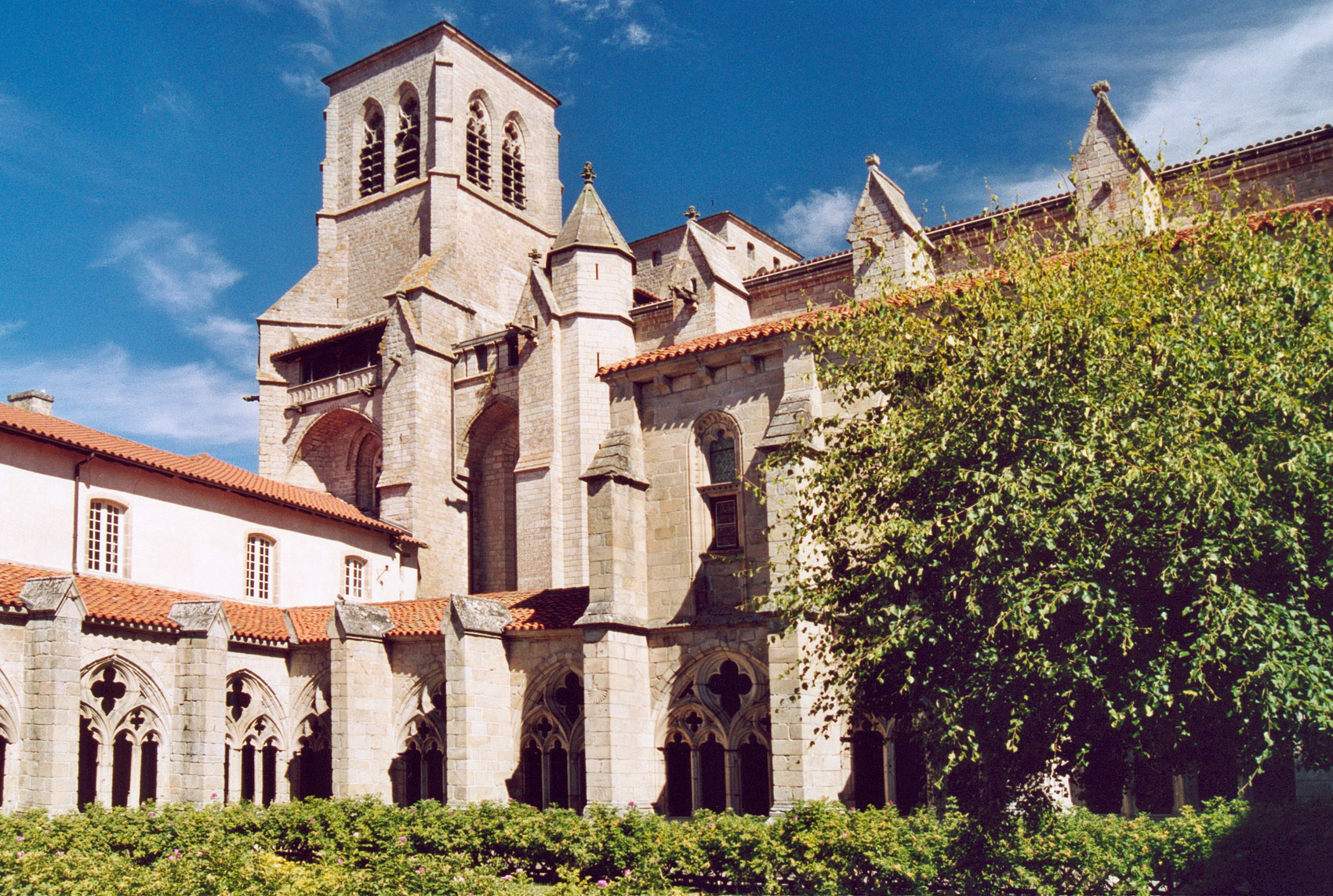
La Chaise-Dieu Abbey

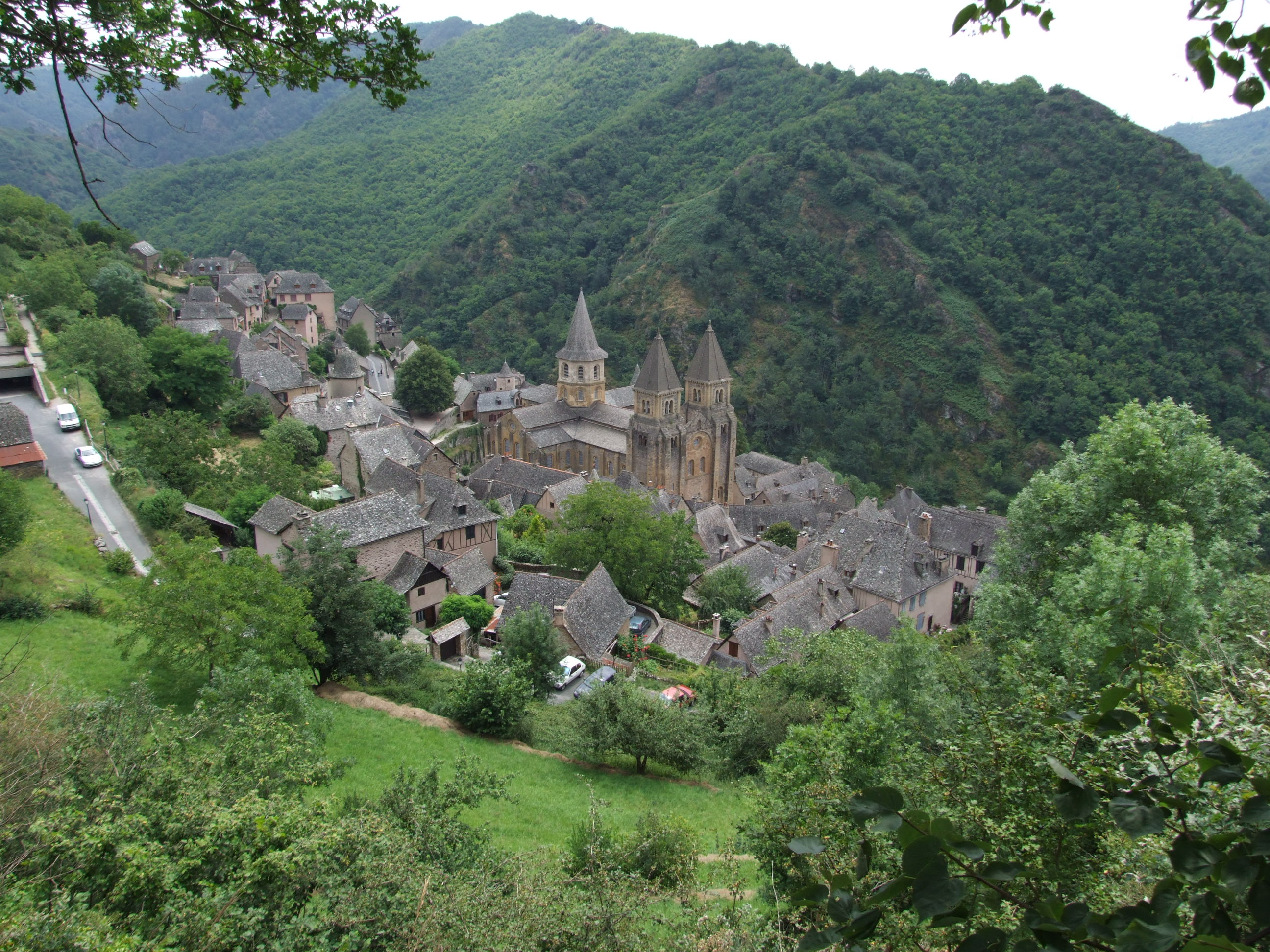
Conques Abbey church

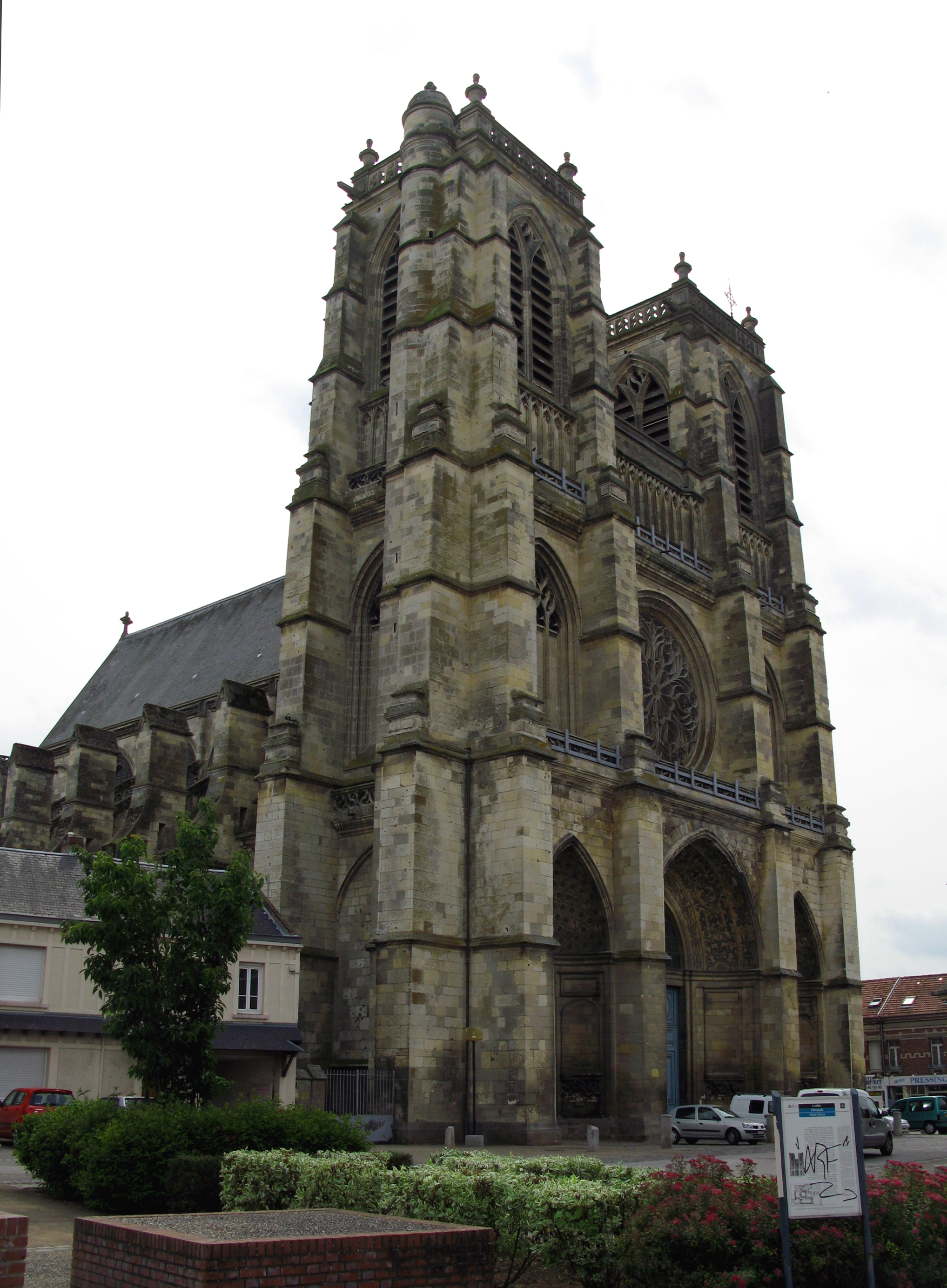
Corbie Abbey

- Caen (Calvados), Diocese of Bayeux:
  - Abbaye aux Dames (Abbaye de la Trinité de Caen), nuns
  - Abbaye aux Hommes (Abbaye Saint-Étienne de Caen), monks
- Cagnotte Abbey (Abbaye Notre-Dame de Cagnotte), monks, Diocese of Aire, later Diocese of Dax (Cagnotte, Landes)
- Calvary Abbey, La Fère: see La Fère
- Cambrai (Nord), Diocese of Cambrai:
  - Abbey of the Holy Sepulchre, Cambrai (Abbaye du Saint-Sépulcre de Cambrai), monks (1064-1791)
  - Cambrai Abbey, see Fémy Abbey, (Abbaye de Notre-Dame de la Consolation de Cambrai, Abbaye des Anglaises (1625-1795)), nuns
- Le Canigou Abbey (Abbaye Saint-Martin du Canigou), monks, Diocese of Perpignan (Casteil, Pyrénées-Orientales)
- La Capelle Abbey (Abbaye de la Capelle or des Capples), Diocese of Arras, later Diocese of Boulogne (1090–1348) (Les Attaques, Pas-de-Calais)
- Cateau-Cambrésis Abbey (Abbaye Saint-André du Cateau-Cambrésis), monks, Diocese of Cambrai (Le Cateau-Cambrésis, Nord)
- Caunes Abbey (Abbaye Saint-Pierre et Saint-Paul de Caunes), monks, Diocese of Narbonne (?-1791) (Caunes-Minervois, Aude)
- Cavaillon Abbey (Abbaye Saint-Jean de Cavaillon), nuns, Diocese of Cavaillon (Cavaillon, Vaucluse)
- La Celle Abbey (Abbaye de La Celle; rarely seen as "Artecelle Abbey" or Abbaye d'Artecelle), nuns, Diocese of Aix (La Celle, Var)
- Cendras Abbey otherwise Sendras Abbey (Abbaye de Cendras or Sendras), monks, Diocese of Alès (Cendras, Gard)
- Cerisy Abbey (Abbaye de Cerisy-la-Forêt or Abbaye Saint-Vigor de Cerisy), monks, Diocese of Bayeux (Cerisy-la-Forêt, Manche)
- Chaalis Abbey (Abbaye de Chaalis), monks (Fontaine-Chaalis near Ermenonville, Oise): Benedictine up to 1136, thereafter Cistercian
- Abbey of La Chaise-Dieu (Abbaye de la Chaise-Dieu or Abbaye Saint-Robert de la Chaise-Dieu) (La Chaise-Dieu, Haute-Loire)
- Chalon Abbey (Abbaye Saint-Pierre de Chalon), monks, Diocese of Chalon-sur-Saône (Chalon-sur-Saône, Saône-et-Loire)
- Chambon Abbey (Abbaye de Chambon or de Notre-Dame de Chambon), monks, Diocese of Poitiers (Mauzé-Thouarsais, Deux-Sèvres)
- Chantelle Abbey (Abbaye Saint-Vincent de Chantelle), nuns (1890-) (Chantelle, Allier)
- Chapaize Priory (Prieuré Saint-Martin de Chapaize), monks (11th century-?) (Chapaize, Saône-et-Loire)
- Charenton Abbey (Abbaye de Charenton), nuns, Diocese of Bourges (Charenton-du-Cher, Cher)
- Abbaye de la Charité, monks, Diocese of Auxerre
- Charlieu Abbey (Abbaye de Charlieu or Abbaye Saint-Fortuné de Charlieu), monks (Charlieu, Loire)
- Charroux Abbey (Abbaye Saint-Sauveur de Charroux), monks, Diocese of Poitiers (785-1760) (Charroux, Vienne)
- Chassemidy Abbey or Chasse-midi Abbey (Abbaye du Chassemidy, Abbaye de Notre-Dame de la Consolation de Chasse-midy), nuns, Diocese of Paris (Rue du Cherche-Midi, 5th and 16th arrondissements, Paris)
- Château-Chalon Abbey (Abbaye de Château-Chalon), nuns, Diocese of Besançon (Château-Chalon, often spelt Château-Châlon, Jura)
- Château-Landon Abbey (Abbaye de Château-Landon), nuns, Diocese of Sens (Château-Landon, Seine-et-Marne)
- Châteaudun Abbey (Abbaye Saint-Avit de Châteaudun), nuns, Diocese of Chartres (Châteaudun, Eure-et-Loir)
- Châtenoy Abbey or Châtenois Abbey (Abbaye de Châtenoy or Châtenois), monks, Diocese of Toul (Châtenois, Vosges)
- La Chaume Abbey (Abbaye Notre-Dame de la Chaume), monks, Diocese of Nantes (1055-1262) (Machecoul, Loire-Atlantique)
- Chaumes-en-Brie Abbey (Abbaye Saint-Pierre de Chaumes-en-Brie), monks, Diocese of Sens (752-1747) (Chaumes-en-Brie, Seine-et-Marne)
- Les Chazeaux Abbey (Abbaye de Chazeaux-en-Forez), nuns (1332-1791; originally Poor Clares, Benedictines from the early 17th century) Diocese of Lyon (Chazeaux-en-Forez near Firminy, Loire; moved to Lyon 1617)
- Les Chazes Abbey otherwise Les Chases Abbey (Abbaye Saint-Pierre des Chazes or des Chases), nuns, Diocese of Clermont (Saint-Julien-des-Chazes, Haute-Loire)
- Chelles Abbey (Abbaye Notre-Dame de Chelles), nuns, Diocese of Paris, later Diocese of Meaux (Chelles, Seine-et-Marne)
- Chezal-Benoît Abbey (Abbaye Saint-Pierre de Chezal-Benoît), monks, Diocese of Bourges (Chezal-Benoît, Cher)
- Chézy Abbey (Abbaye de Chézy), monks, Diocese of Soissons (either Chézy-en-Orxois or Chézy-sur-Marne, both in Aisne)
- Cimiez Abbey or Abbey of St Pons, Cimiez (Abbaye Saint-Pons de Cimiez), Diocese of Nice (?-1792) (Cimiez, Nice)
- Clairac Abbey (Abbaye de Clairac), Diocese of Agen (?-1604) (Clairac, Lot-et-Garonne)
- Clairval Abbey (Abbaye Saint-Joseph de Clairval), monks (1992-) (Flavigny-sur-Ozerain, Côte-d'Or)
- Clausonne Abbey (Abbaye de Clausonne), monks, Diocese of Gap (Clausonne in Le Saix, Gap)
- Clermont Abbey, see Abbey of Saint-Alyre, Clermont
- Cluny Abbey (Abbaye Saint-Pierre et Saint-Paul de Cluny), monks, Diocese of Mâcon (?-1790) (Cluny, Saône-et-Loire)
- Compiègne Abbey (Abbaye Saint-Corneille de Compiègne), monks, Diocese of Soissons (Compiègne, Oise)
- Conches Abbey (Abbaye de Conches), monks, Diocese of Évreux (Conches-en-Ouche, Eure)
- Condat Abbey (Abbaye de Condat, later Abbaye Saint-Oyend de Joux, later Abbaye du Grand-Saint-Claude), monks (Saint-Claude, Jura): see also Great St Claude's Abbey
- Conflans Priory (Prieuré Sainte-Honorine de Conflans), monks, Diocese of Paris (1080- ) (Conflans-Sainte-Honorine, Yvelines)
- Conques Abbey (Abbaye Sainte-Foy de Conques), monks, Diocese of Rodez (-1537) (Conques, Aveyron)
- Corbie Abbey (Abbaye Saint-Pierre de Corbie), monks, Diocese of Amiens (Corbie, Somme)
- Corbigny Abbey (Abbaye Saint-Léonard de Corbigny), monks, Diocese of Autun (Corbigny, Nièvre)
- Cordillon Abbey, also Cordeillon Abbey (Abbaye Saint-Laurent de Cordeillon or Cordillon), nuns, Diocese of Bayeux (1201-?) (Cordillon-aux-Nonnains, Lingèvres, Calvados)
- Cormeilles Abbey (Abbaye de Cormeilles), monks, Diocese of Lisieux (Cormeilles, Eure)
- Cormery Abbey (Abbaye Saint-Paul de Cormery), monks, Diocese of Tours (Cormery, Indre-et-Loire)
- Coulombes Abbey otherwise Coulombs Abbey (Abbaye Notre-Dame de Coulombes or Coulombs), monks, Diocese of Chartres (Coulombs, Eure-et-Loir)
- Crespin Abbey (Abbaye Saint-Pierre de Crespin), in Hainaut, monks, Diocese of Cambrai (Crespin, Nord)
- Crest Priory, Diocese of Valence, became vacant and was given to the Capuchin friars in 1609 (Crest, Drôme)
- Crisenon Abbey (Abbaye de Crisenon or Notre-Dame de Crisenon), nuns, Diocese of Auxerre (Prégilbert, Yonne)
- Croix-Saint-Leufroy Abbey (Abbaye de la Croix-Saint-Leufroy), monks, Diocese of Évreux (La Croix-Saint-Leufroy, Eure)
- Cruas Abbey (Abbaye Notre-Dame de Cruas), monks, Diocese of Viviers (Cruas, Ardèche)
- Cusset Abbey (Abbaye de Cusset), nuns, Diocese of Clermont (Cusset, Allier)
- Cuxa Abbey or Abbey of Saint-Michel-de-Cuxa (French: Abbaye Saint-Michel de Cuxa; Catalan: Sant Miquel de Cuixà), monks, Diocese of Perpignan (878-1793; Cistercians 1919-1965; re-founded as Benedictine, as a daughter priory of Montserrat Abbey, 1965- ) (Codalet, Pyrénées-Orientales)

== D ==
- Denain Abbey (Abbaye de Denain), nuns, Diocese of Arras (Denain, Nord)
- Déols Abbey otherwise Bourg-Dieu (Abbaye Notre-Dame, Saint-Pierre et Saint-Paul de Déols or Bourg-Dieu), Diocese of Bourges (Déols, Indre)
- Abbaye Notre-Dame de la Déserte ("Our Lady of the Wasteland"), Poor Clares 1304-1503; Benedictine nuns 1503-Revolution, Diocese of Lyon (on La Croix-Rousse in the parish of La Platière, now part of Lyon, Rhône)
- Dieulouard Abbey (Abbaye Saint-Laurent de Dieulouard), English Benedictine monks in exile (1608-?) (Dieulouard, Meurthe-et-Moselle)
- Abbey of St Benignus, Dijon (Abbaye Saint-Bénigne de Dijon), monks, Diocese of Langres, later Diocese of Dijon (Dijon, Côte d'Or)
- Le Dorat Abbey (Abbaye du Dorat), nuns, Diocese of Limoges (Le Dorat, Haute-Vienne)
- Douai (Nord), Diocese of Arras:
  - Abbaye de la Paix or Abbaye de la Paix-Notre-Dame, nuns
  - Priory of St Gregory, Douai (Prieuré Saint-Grégoire de Douai), English monks in exile (1605–1793)
  - Priory of St Edmund, Douai (Prieuré Saint-Edmond de Douai), English monks in exile, formerly in Paris (1818–1903)
- Doullens Abbey (Abbaye Saint-Michel de Doullens), nuns, Diocese of Amiens (Doullens, Somme)
- Dourgne Abbey (Abbaye Sainte-Scholastique de Dourgne), nuns (Dourgne, Tarn)
- Dunkirk Abbey (Abbaye de Dunkerque), nuns, Diocese of Ypres (Dunkirk, Nord)

== E ==
- Ebersmunster Abbey (Abbaye Saint-Maurice d'Ebersmunster), monks, Diocese of Strasbourg (Ebersmunster, Bas-Rhin)
- Ébreuil Abbey (Abbaye Saint-Léger d'Ébreuil), monks, Diocese of Clermont (Ébreuil, Allier)
- Elnon(e) Abbey, also Elnon-en-Pévèle Abbey, see Saint-Amand Abbey
- En-Calcat Abbey (Abbaye Saint-Benoît d'En-Calcat), monks (Dourgne, Tarn)
- Épinal Abbey (Abbaye d'Épinal), nuns, Diocese of Saint-Dié (Épinal, Vosges)
- Essay Abbey or Eyssès Abbey (Abbaye Saint-Gervais et Saint-Protais d'Essay or d'Eyssès-sur-Lot), Diocese of Agen (Villeneuve-sur-Lot, Lot-et-Garonne)
- Étival Abbey (Abbaye d'Étival-en-Charnie or Abbaye Notre-Dame d'Étival-en-Charnie, nuns, Diocese of Le Mans (Chemiré-en-Charnie, Sarthe)
- Étrun Abbey (Abbaye d'Étrun), nuns, Diocese of Arras (Étrun, Pas-de-Calais)
- Évreux (Eure), Diocese of Évreux:
  - St Saviour's Abbey, Évreux (Abbaye Saint-Sauveur-d'Évreux), nuns
  - Abbey of St Taurin, Évreux (Abbaye de Saint-Taurin d'Évreux), monks
- Évron Abbey (Abbaye Notre-Dame d'Évron), monks, Diocese of Le Mans (Évron, Mayenne)
- Eyres-Moncube Abbey (Abbaye Notre-Dame-de-Saint-Eustase d'Eyres-Moncube), nuns (Eyres-Moncube, Landes)

== F ==
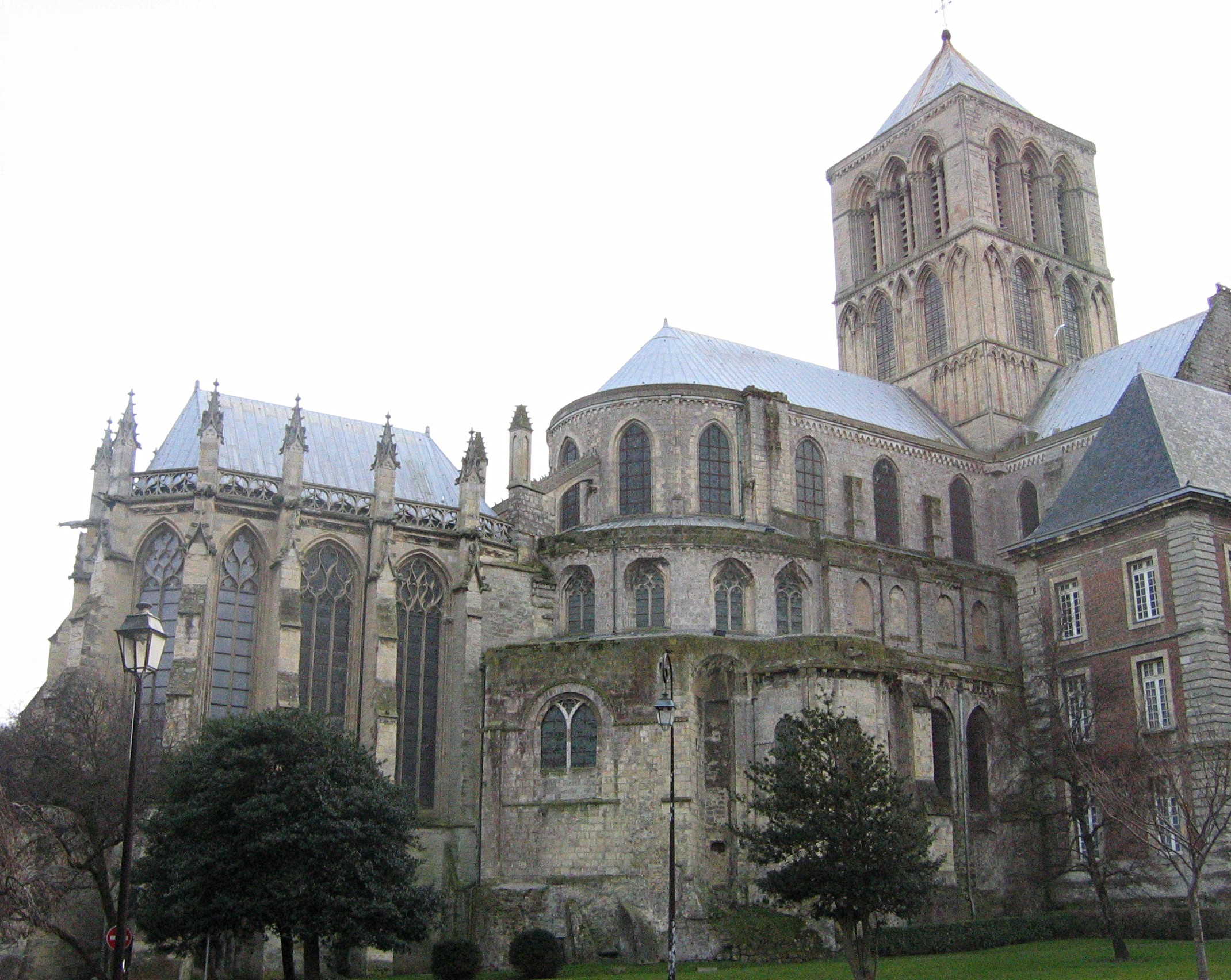
Fécamp Abbey

- Faremoutiers Abbey (Abbaye de Faremoutiers or Abbaye Notre-Dame et Saint-Pierre de Faremoutiers), nuns, Diocese of Meaux (Faremoutiers, Seine-et-Marne)
- Faverney Abbey (Abbaye de Faverney), monks, Diocese of Besançon (Faverney, Haute-Saône)
- Fécamp Abbey (Abbaye de la Trinité de Fécamp), monks, Diocese of Rouen (Fécamp, Seine-Maritime)
- Fémy Abbey (Abbaye de Fémy), monks, Diocese of Cambrai (Cambrai, Nord), (taken over as a ruin in 1621, by English Benedictine nuns, later at Stanbrook Abbey, England)
- Calvary Abbey, La Fère (Abbaye du Calvaire de La Fère), nuns, Diocese of Laon (La Fère, Aisne)
- Ferrières Abbey (Abbaye Saint-Léonard de Ferrières), Diocese of Poitiers (Bouillé-Loretz, Deux-Sèvres)
- Ferrières-en-Gâtinais Abbey (Abbaye de Ferrières), monks, Diocese of Sens (Ferrières-en-Gâtinais, Loiret)
- La Ferté Abbey (Benedictine) (Abbaye de la Ferté), nuns, Diocese of Nîmes
- Figeac Abbey (Abbaye Saint-Sauveur de Figeac), monks, Diocese of Cahors (?-1536) (Figeac, Lot)
- Flavigny Abbey (Abbaye Saint-Pierre de Flavigny), monks, Diocese of Autun (Flavigny-sur-Ozerain, Côte-d'Or)
- Fleury Abbey (Abbaye de Fleury or Abbaye Saint-Benoît de Fleury), monks, Diocese of Orléans (Saint-Benoît-sur-Loire, Loiret)
- Fontdouce Abbey (Abbaye de Fontdouce or Abbaye Notre-Dame de Fontdouce), monks, Diocese of Saintes (Saint-Bris-des-Bois, Charente-Maritime)
- Fontenay Abbey (Abbaye Saint-Étienne de Fontenay), monks, Diocese of Bayeux (Fontenay-le-Marmion, Calvados)
- Fontenelle Abbey, see Abbey of Saint-Wandrille
- Fontevrault Abbey, also Fontevraud Abbey (Abbaye de Fontevrault or Fontevraud), nuns (Fontevraud-l'Abbaye, Maine-et-Loire)
- Fontgombault Abbey (Abbaye Notre-Dame de Fontgombault), monks, Diocese of Bourges (Fontgombault, Indre)
- Fontgouffier Abbey otherwise Fongauffier Abbey (Abbaye de Fontgouffier or Fongauffier), nuns, Diocese of Sarlat (Sagelat, Dordogne)
- Foresmoutier Abbey (Abbaye de Foresmoutier), monks, Diocese of Amiens (Saint-Riquier, Somme)
- Frigolet Abbey (Abbaye Saint-Michel de Frigolet), monks (Tarascon-sur-Rhône, Bouches-du-Rhône)

== G ==
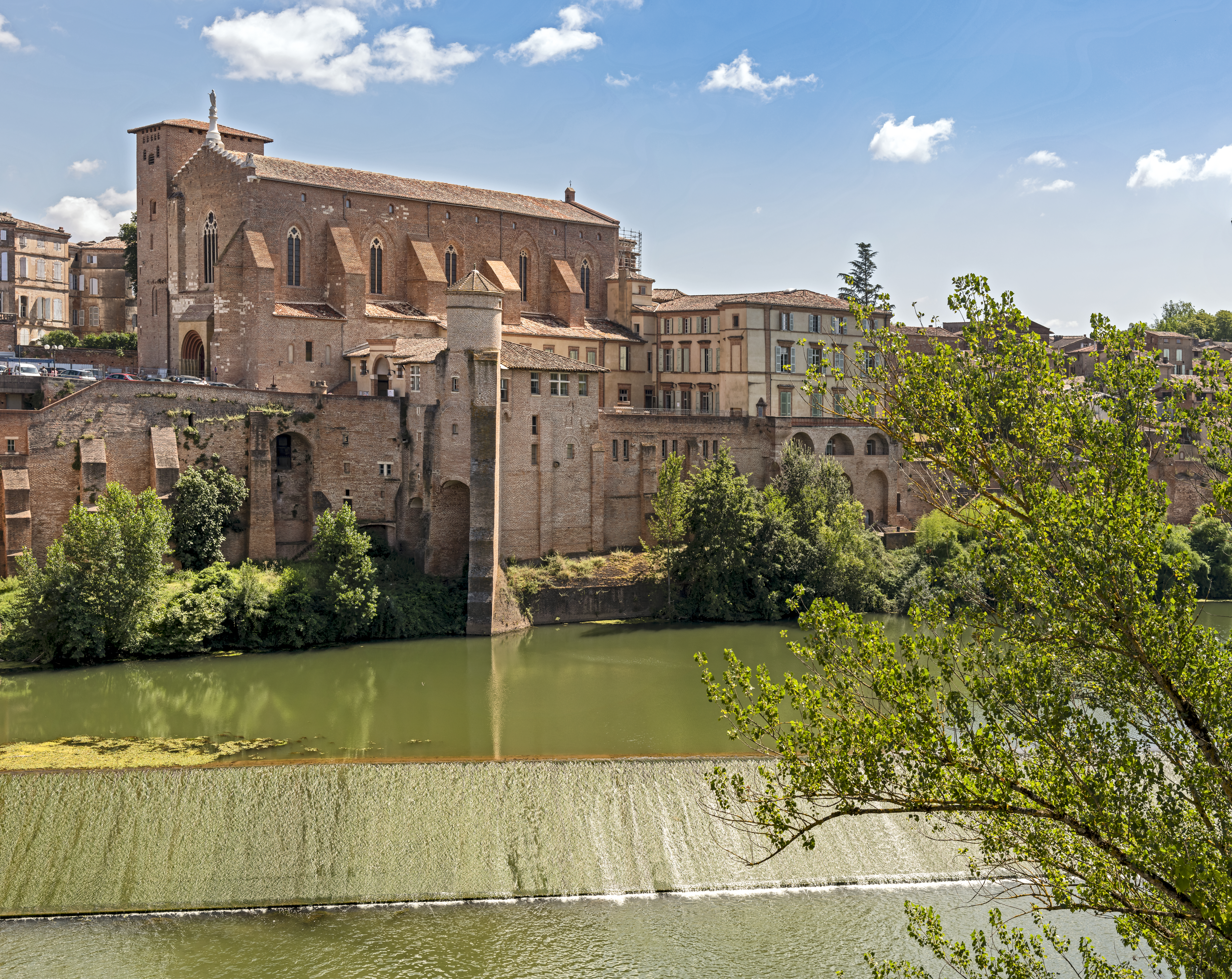
Gaillac Abbey

- Gaël Abbey, or Abbey of St John, Gaël (Abbaye Saint-Jean de Gaël), monks (Gaël, Ille-et-Vilaine): predecessor of Saint-Méen Abbey, qv
- Gaillac Abbey (Abbaye Saint-Michel de Gaillac), Diocese of Albi (Gaillac, Tarn)
- Ganagobie Abbey, also Priory (Abbaye Notre-Dame de Ganagobie), monks (Ganagobie, Alpes-de-Haute-Provence)
- Gaussan Abbey (Abbaye Notre-Dame de Gaussan) (founded as a priory in 1994, raised to an abbey in 2004) (Bizanet, Aude)
- Gellone Abbey: see Abbaye de Saint-Guilhem-le-Désert
- Gercy Abbey otherwise Jarcy Abbey (Abbaye de Gercy or Jarcy), nuns, Diocese of Paris (?-1791) (Varennes-Jarcy, Essonne)
- Gif Abbey (Abbaye de Gif), nuns, Diocese of Paris (Gif-sur-Yvette, Essonne)
- Gigny Abbey (Abbaye Saint-Pierre de Gigny) (Gigny, Jura)
- Glandières Abbey otherwise La Glandière Abbey (Abbaye Saint-Martin de Glandières or de la Glandière), Diocese of Metz (Longeville-lès-Saint-Avold, Moselle)

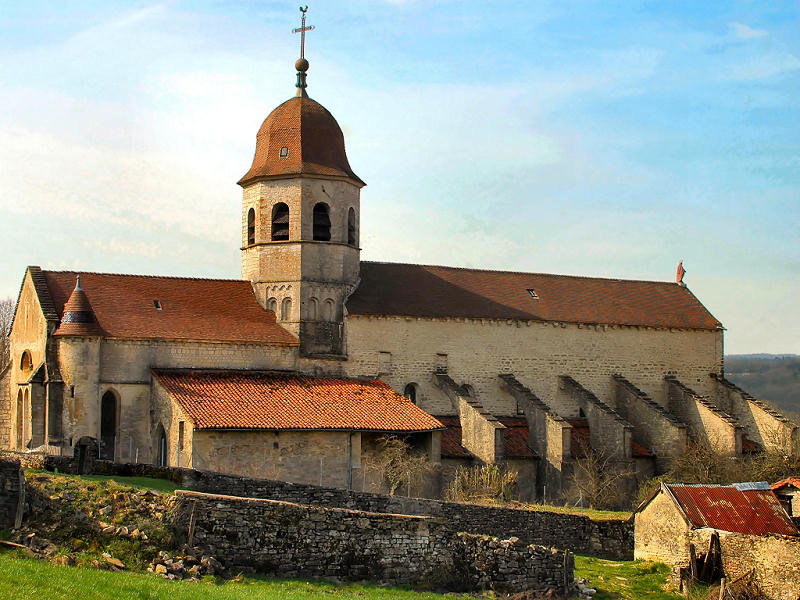
Gigny Abbey (Jura)

- Glanfeuil Abbey (Abbaye de Glanfeuil, Abbaye Saint-Maur de Glanfeuil or Abbaye de Saint-Maur-sur-Loire), monks, Diocese of Angers (Saint-Maur-sur-Loire in Le Thoureil, Maine-et-Loire)
- Gorjan Abbey (Abbaye Saint-Étienne de Gorjan), nuns, Diocese of Lodève (Clermont-l'Hérault, Hérault)
- Gorze Abbey (Abbaye de Gorze or Abbaye Saint-Étienne et Saint-Gorgon de Gorze), monks, Diocese of Metz (Gorze, Bas-Rhin)
- Grâce-Dieu Abbey (Abbaye de la Grâce-Dieu), nuns, Diocese of Rouen (Rouen, Seine-Maritime): English Benedictine nuns established here in 1658
- La Grainetière Abbey (Abbaye Notre-Dame de la Grainetière), Diocese of Poitiers (Les Herbiers, Vendée)
- Grande-Sauve Abbey otherwise Sauve-Majeure Abbey (Abbaye de la Grande-Sauve or de la Sauve-Majeure), monks, Diocese of Bordeaux (La Sauve, Gironde)
- Great St Claude's Abbey (Abbaye du Grand-Saint-Claude), monks, Diocese of Lyon (Saint-Claude, Jura): previously Condat Abbey, qv
- Grestain Abbey (Abbaye de Grestain), monks, Diocese of Lisieux (Fatouville-Grestain, Eure)
- Gué-de-Launay Abbey (Abbaye du Gué-de-Launay), monks, Diocese of Le Mans (Vibraye, Sarthe)
- Guînes Abbey (Abbaye Saint-Léonard de Guînes), nuns, Diocese of Thérouanne, later Diocese of Boulogne (Guînes, Pas-de-Calais)
- Guîtres Abbey otherwise Guistres Abbey (Abbaye Notre-Dame de Guîtres or Guistres), monks, Diocese of Bordeaux (Guîtres, Gironde)

== H ==
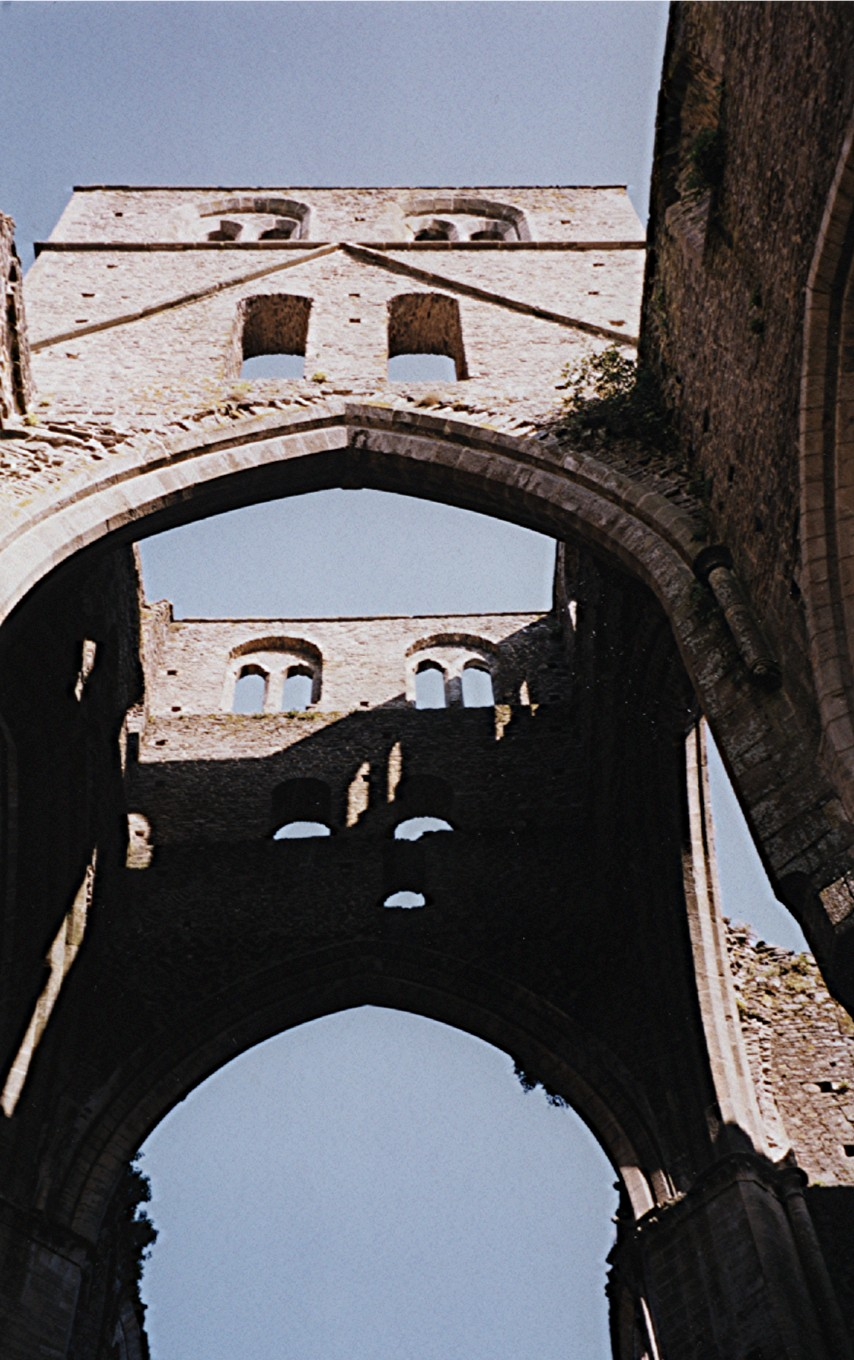
Hambye Abbey

- Ham-les-Lillers Abbey (Abbaye d'Ham-les-Lillers), monks, Diocese of Saint-Omer (Ham-en-Artois, Pas-de-Calais)
- Hambye Abbey otherwise Hambie Abbey (Abbaye de Hambye or Abbaye Notre-Dame de Hambye or Hambie), monks, Diocese of Coutances (1147-1790) (Hambye, Manche)
- Hasnon Abbey (Abbaye de Hasnon or d'Hasnon), nuns, Diocese of Arras (Hasnon, Nord)
- Hautmont Abbey (Abbaye de Hautmont or d'Hautmont), monks, Diocese of Cambrai (Hautmont, Nord)
- Hautecombe Abbey (Abbaye de Hautecombe), monks (near Aix-les-Bains, Savoie): Cistercians c1125-1792; Benedictines 1922-1992 (formerly at Marseilles Priory, 1865–1922; moved to Ganagobie Abbey 1992)
- Hautvillers Abbey (Abbaye Saint-Pierre d'Hautvillers), monks, Diocese of Reims (Hautvillers, Marne)
- Herbitzheim Abbey (Abbaye de Herbitzheim), nuns (Herbitzheim, Bas-Rhin)
- Homblières Abbey (Abbaye d'Homblières), monks, Diocese of Noyon (Homblières, Aisne)
- Honcourt Abbey (Abbaye de Honcourt), monks (Itterswiller, Bas-Rhin)
- Honnecourt Abbey (Abbaye d'Honnecourt), monks, Diocese of Cambrai (Honnecourt-sur-Escaut, Nord)
- Huiron Abbey (Abbaye Saint-Martin de Huiron), monks, Diocese of Châlons-sur-Marne (Huiron, Marne)

== I ==
- Île-Barbe Abbey (Abbaye de l'Île-Barbe), monks, Diocese of Lyon (638-1375) (Île Barbe, Lyon, Rhône)
- Île Chauvet Abbey (Abbaye de l'Ile Chauvet or Abbaye Notre-Dame-de-l'Assomption de l'Île Chauvet), monks, Diocese of Luçon (1130-1791) (Bois-de-Céné, Vendée)
- Issoire Abbey (Abbaye Saint-Austremoine d'Issoire), monks, Diocese of Clermont (Issoire, Puy-de-Dôme)
- Issoudun Abbey (Abbaye Notre-Dame d'Issoudun), monks, Diocese of Bourges (Issoudun, Indre)
- Issy Abbey (Abbaye d'Issy), nuns, Diocese of Paris (Issy-les-Moulineaux, Hauts-de-Seine)
- Ivry Abbey (Abbaye d'Ivry), monks, Diocese of Évreux (Ivry-la-Bataille, Eure)

== J ==
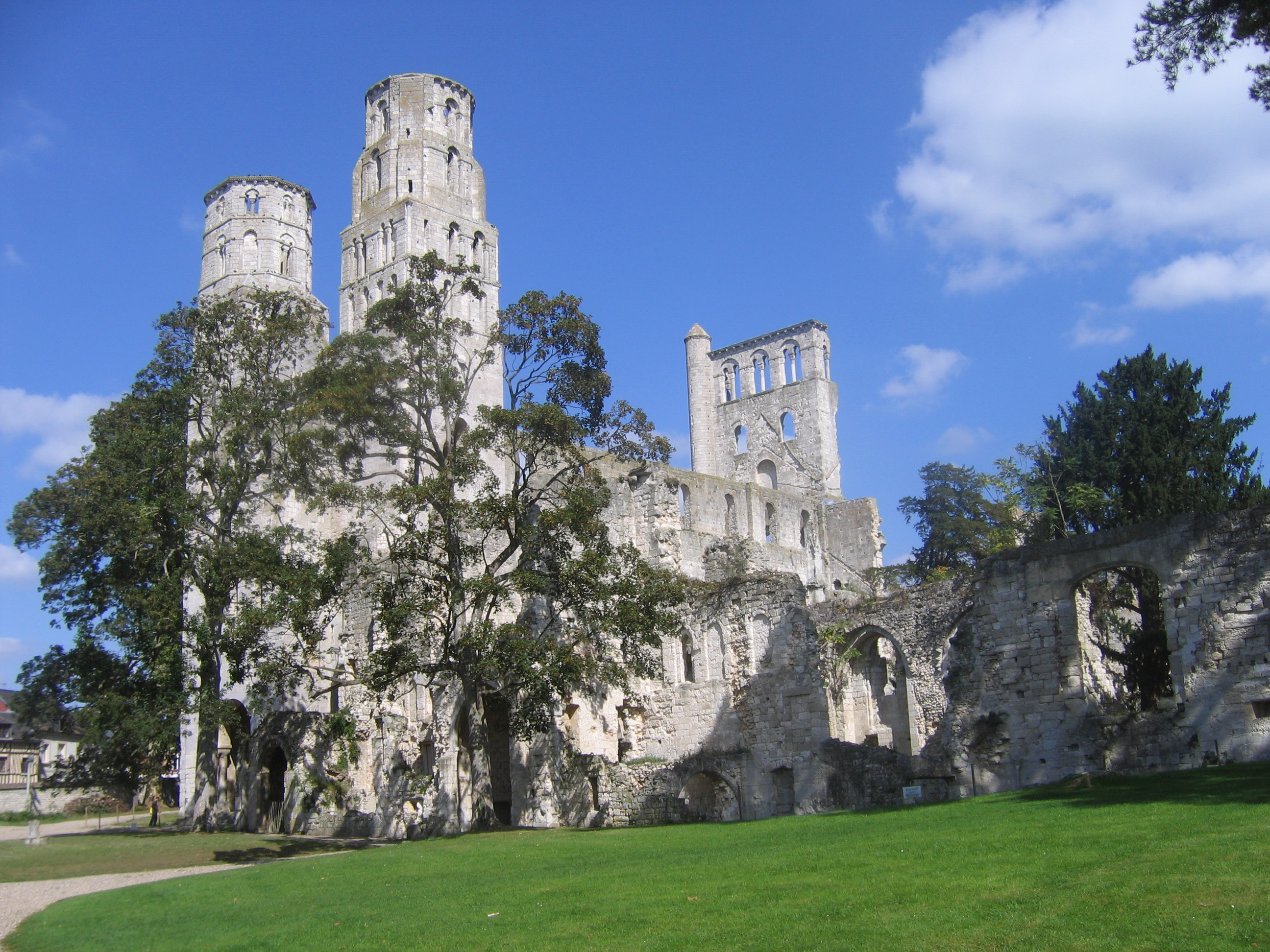
Jumièges Abbey

- Jarcy Abbey, see Gercy Abbey
- Le Jard Abbey (Abbaye du Jard, Abbaye royale de Saint Jean-Baptiste du Jard, Abbaye Saint-Jean du Jard-de-la-Reine), nuns, Diocese of Sens (Voisenon, Seine-et-Marne)
- Joncels Abbey or Jaucel Abbey (Abbaye Saint-Pierre de Joncels or Jaucel), monks, Diocese of Béziers (Joncels, Hérault)
- Abbey of Josaphat-lès-Chartres (Abbaye de Josaphat-lès-Chartres, Abbaye Notre-Dame de Josaphat), monks, Diocese of Chartres (Lèves, Eure-et-Loir)
- Jouarre Abbey (Abbaye Notre-Dame de Jouarre), nuns, Diocese of Meaux (Jouarre, Seine-et-Marne)
- Jougdieu or Joug Dieu Abbey (Abbaye de Jougdieu or de Joug Dieu)), monks, Diocese of Lyon (Crêches-sur-Saône, Saône-et-Loire)
- Abbaye Notre-Dame-de-Fidélité de Jouques, nuns (founded 1967; abbey from 1981) (Jouques, Bouches-du-Rhône)
- Jumièges Abbey (Abbaye de Jumièges or Abbaye Saint-Pierre de Jumièges), monks, Diocese of Rouen (Jumièges, Seine-Maritime)
- Juvigny Abbey (Abbaye Sainte-Scholastique de Juvigny), nuns (Juvigny-sur-Loison, Meuse)

== K ==
- Kerbénéat Priory (Prieuré de Kerbénéat), nuns (Plounéventer, Finistère) (1976–2002)
- Kergonan (Plouharnel, Morbihan):
  - Abbey of St Anne, Kergonan (Abbaye Sainte-Anne de Kergonan), monks

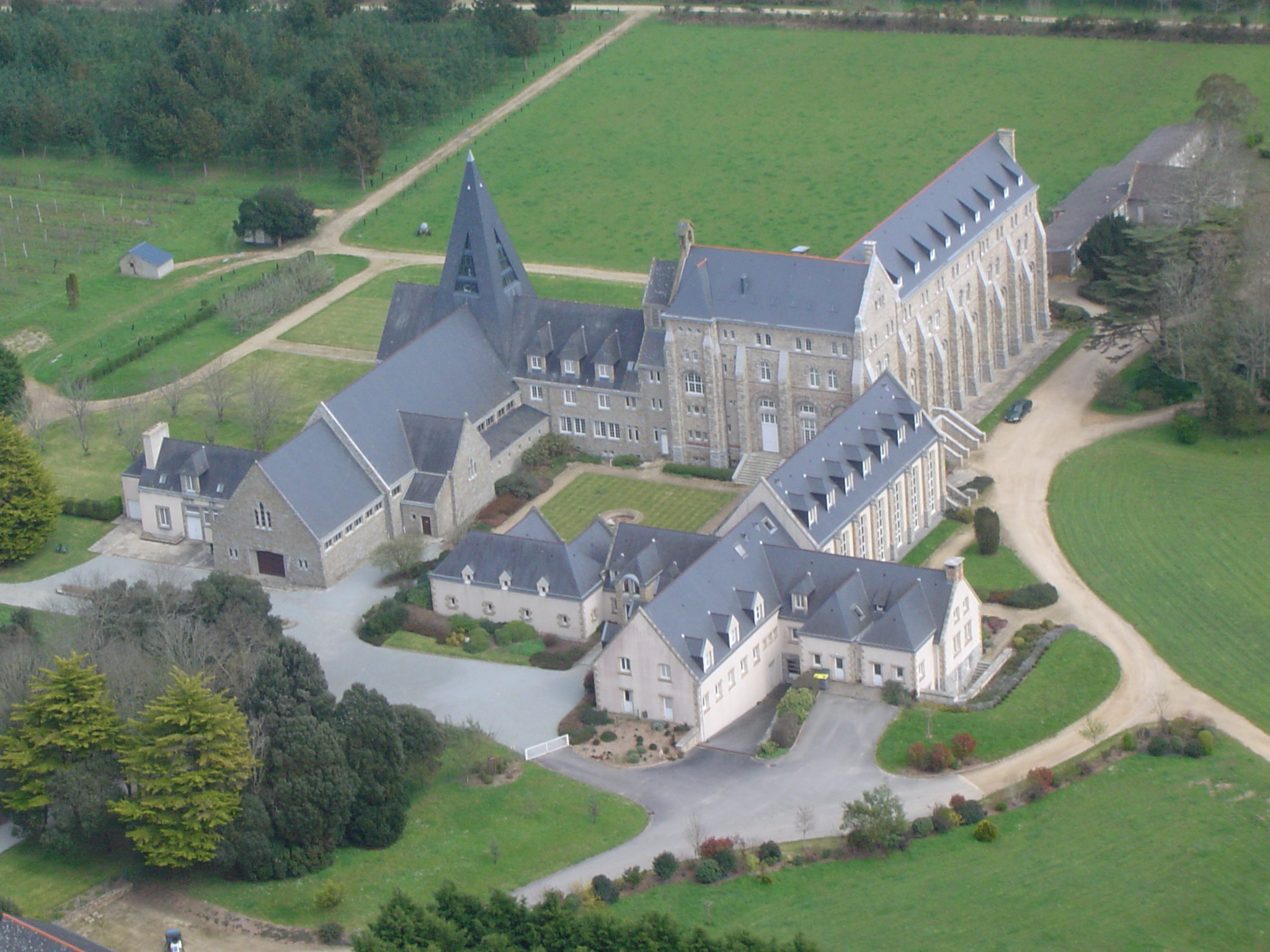
Abbey of St Anne, Kergonan

  - Abbey of St Michael, Kergonan (Abbaye Saint-Michel de Kergonan), nuns

== L ==
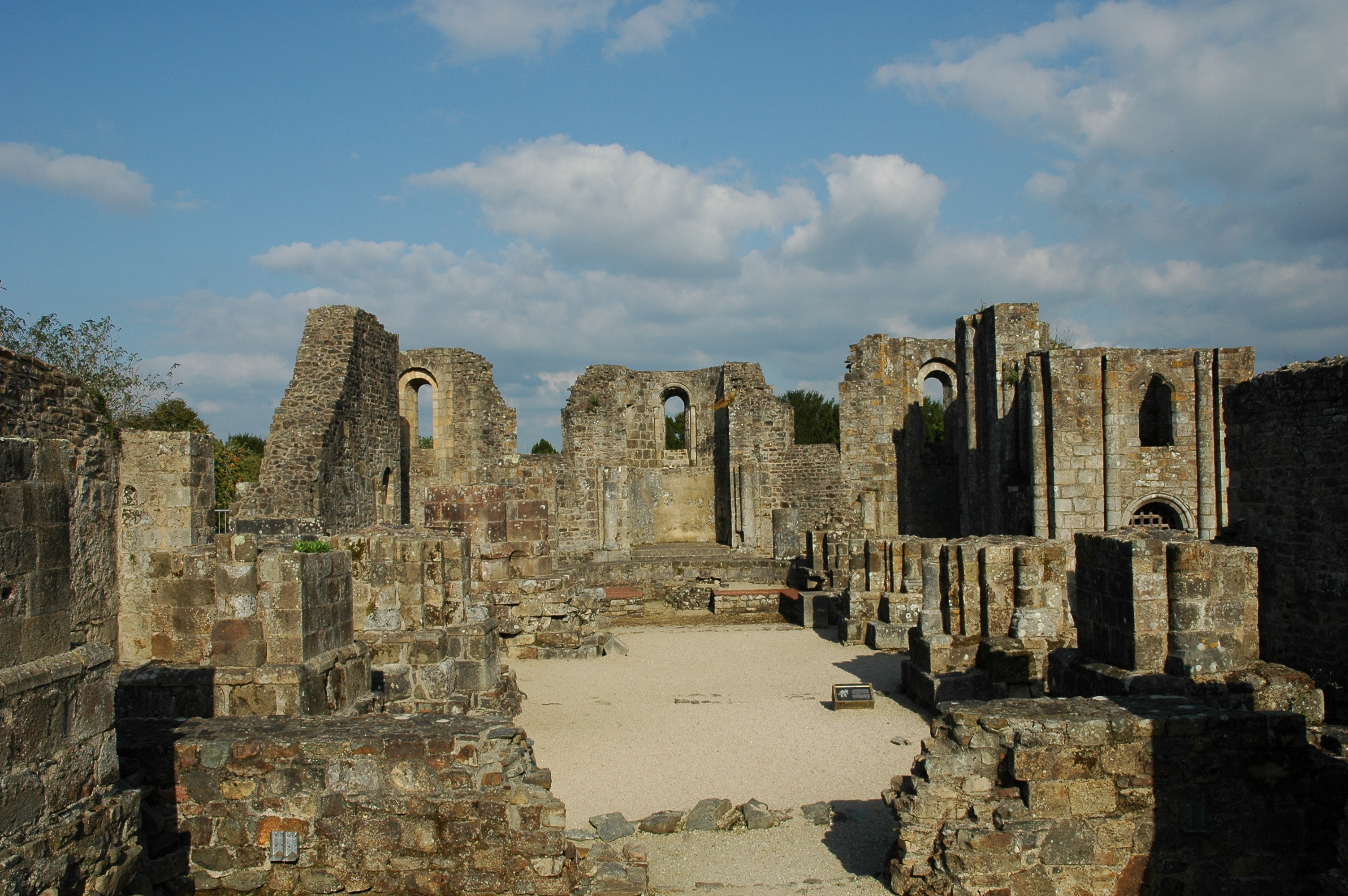
Landévennec Abbey

- Lagny Abbey (Abbaye Saint-Pierre de Lagny), monks, Diocese of Paris (Lagny-sur-Marne, Seine-et-Marne)
- Lagrasse Abbey (Abbaye Sainte-Marie de Lagrasse or Abbaye Notre-Dame de Lagrasse), monks, Diocese of Carcassonne (Lagrasse, Aude)
- Lancharre Abbey (Abbaye Notre-Dame de Lancharre), nuns, Diocese of Chalon-sur-Saône (Chapaize, Haute-Saône)
- Landerneau Abbey (or Priory) (Abbaye de l'Immaculée-Conception de Landerneau), nuns (Landerneau, Finistère)
- Landévennec Abbey (Abbaye Saint Guénolé de Landévennec), monks, Diocese of Quimper (Landévennec, Finistère)
- Lantenac Abbey (Abbaye Notre-Dame de Lantenac), monks, Diocese of Saint-Brieuc (La Chèze, Côtes-d'Armor)
- Laon (Aisne), Diocese of Laon:
  - Abbey of St John, Laon (Abbaye Saint-Jean de Laon), nuns
  - Abbey of St Vincent, Laon (Abbaye Saint-Vincent de Laon), monks
- Larreule Abbey, Hautes-Pyrénées (Abbaye Saint-Orens de Larreule), monks, Diocese of Tarbes (Larreule, Hautes-Pyrénées)
- Larreule Abbey, Pyrénées-Atlantiques (Abbaye Saint-Pierre de Larreule), monks (Larreule, Pyrénées-Atlantiques)
- Lassé Abbey, see La Sie Abbey
- Laval Abbey (Abbaye de Laval), nuns, Diocese of Paris
- Lavaudieu Abbey otherwise Lavaudieu Priory (Abbaye Saint-André de Lavaudieu), nuns, (Lavaudieu, Haute-Loire)
- Lay Priory (Prieuré de Lay), monks (Hédouville, Val-d'Oise)
- Lay Priory or Priory of St Arnoul, Lay (Prieuré de Lay or Haute-Lay, Prieuré Saint-Arnoul de Lay), monks, Diocese of Nancy (Haute-Lay in Lay-Saint-Christophe, Meurthe-et-Moselle)
- Lectoure Abbey (Abbaye Saint-Geniès de Lectoure) (Lectoure, Gers)
- Lérins Abbey (Abbaye Saint-Honorat de Lérins), monks (Île Saint-Honorat, Alpes-Maritimes)
- Lessay Abbey (Abbaye de Lessay), monks, Diocese of Coutances (Lessay, Manche)
- Lézat Abbey (Abbaye Saint-Pierre de Lézat), monks, Diocese of Pamiers (1295–1317), later Diocese of Rieux (1317-1790) (Lézat-sur-Lèze, Ariège)
- Liessies Abbey (Abbaye de Liessies), monks, Diocese of Cambrai (?-1791) (Liessies, Nord)
- Ligueux Abbey (Abbaye Notre-Dame de Ligueux), nuns, Diocese of Périgueux (Ligueux, Dordogne)
- Ligugé Abbey (Abbaye Saint-Martin de Ligugé), monks (Ligugé, Vienne)
- Limoges (Haute-Vienne), Diocese of Limoges:
  - Abbey of St Augustine, Limoges (Abbaye Saint-Augustin de Limoges), monks
  - Abbey of St Martial, Limoges (Abbaye Saint-Martial de Limoges), monks (?-1535)
  - Abbey of St Martin, Limoges (Abbaye Saint-Martin de Limoges), monks
  - Abbey of Notre-Dame de la Règle (Abbaye Notre-Dame de la Règle), nuns
- Limon, see Saint-Louis-du-Temple de Limon
- Lire Abbey, see Lyre
- Abbey of St Désir, Lisieux (Abbaye Saint-Désir de Lisieux), nuns, Diocese of Lisieux (Lisieux, Basse-Normandie)
- Longeville Abbey (Abbaye de Longeville), monks, Diocese of Metz (Longeville, Doubs)
- Longues Abbey (Abbaye Sainte-Marie de Longues), monks, Diocese of Bayeux (Longues-sur-Mer, Calvados)
- Lonlay Abbey otherwise Lonlai Abbey (Abbaye de Lonlay or Lonlai), monks, Diocese of Le Mans (Lonlay-l'Abbaye, Orne)
- Lure Abbey (Abbaye Saint-Desle de Lure), monks, Diocese of Besançon (Lure, Haute-Saône)
- Luxeuil Abbey (Abbaye de Luxeuil), monks, Diocese of Besançon (Luxeuil, Haute-Saône)
- Abbey of St Peter, Lyon (Abbaye de Saint-Pierre-les-Nonnains de Lyon), nuns, Diocese of Lyon (Lyon, Rhône)
- Lyre Abbey or Lire Abbey (Abbaye Notre-Dame de Lyre or de Lire), monks, Diocese of Évreux (La Vieille-Lyre, Eure)

== M ==
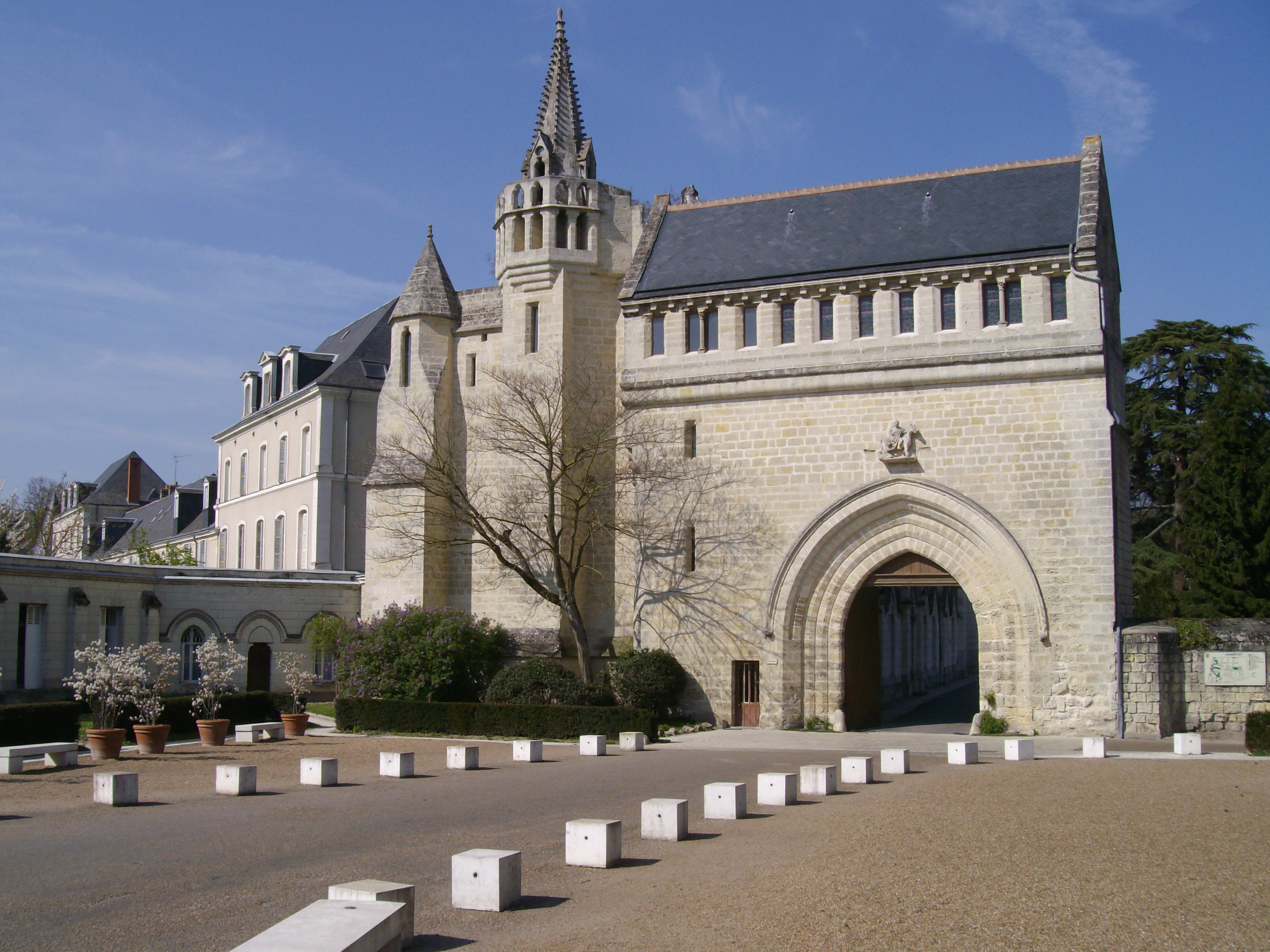
Marmoutier Abbey

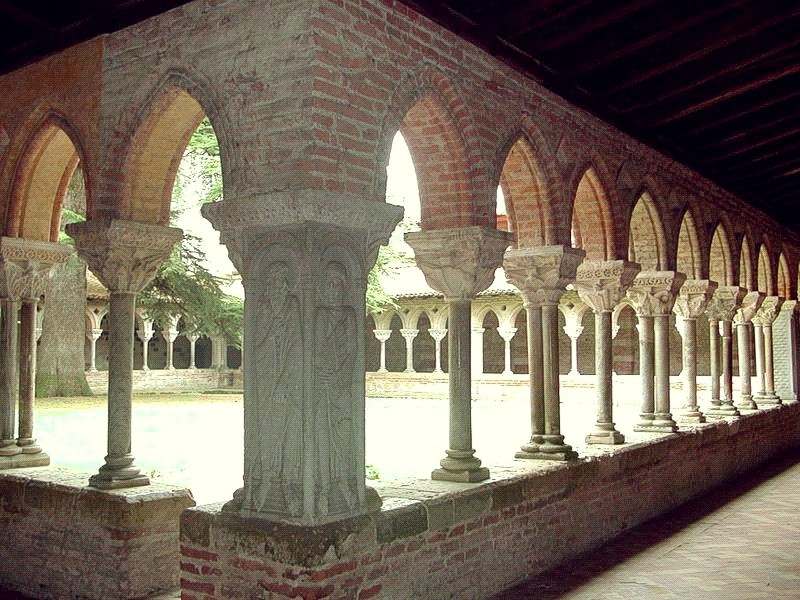
Moissac Abbey

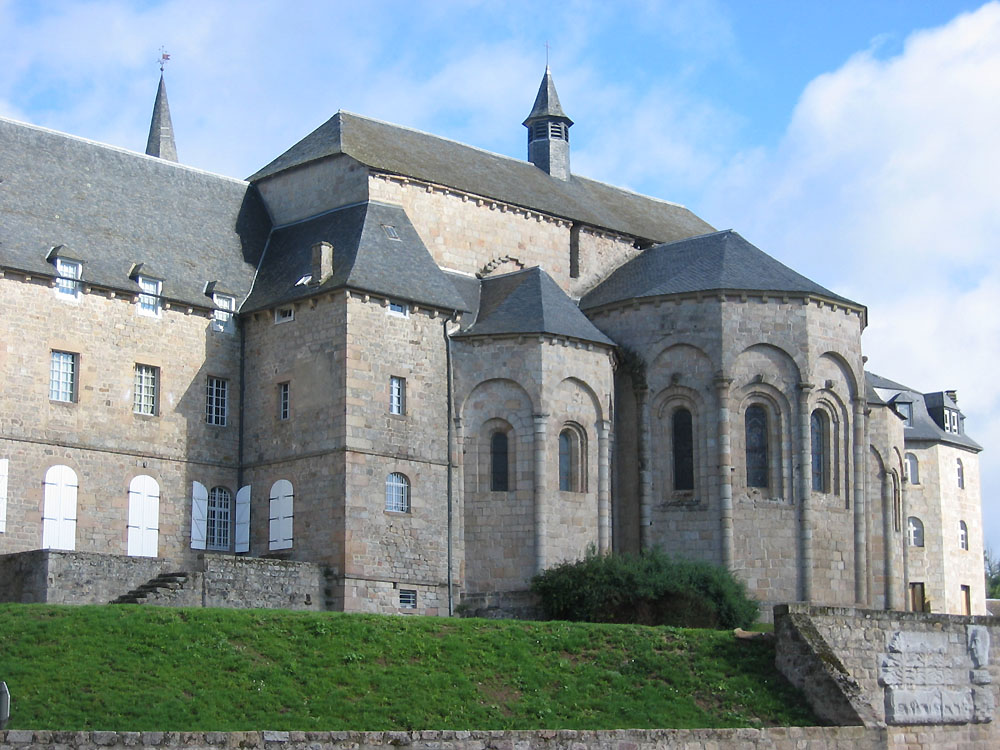
Meymac Abbey

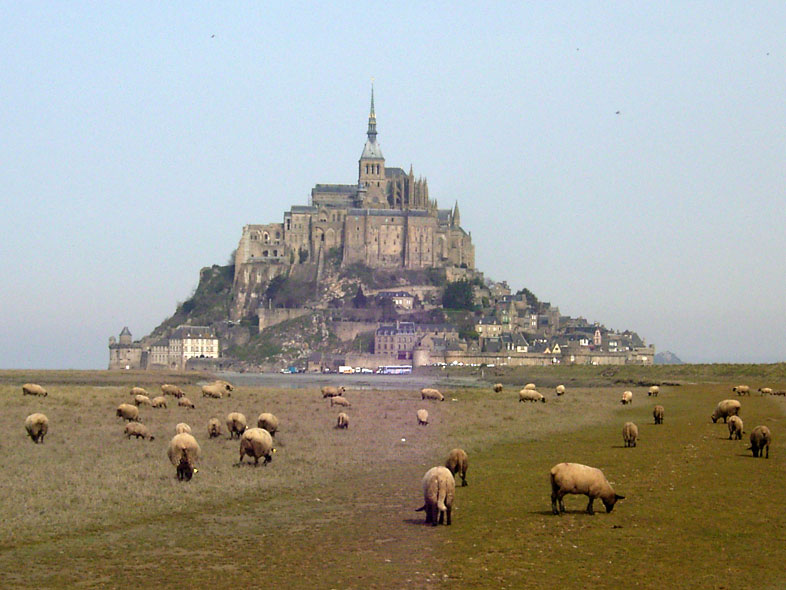
Mont-Saint-Michel Abbey

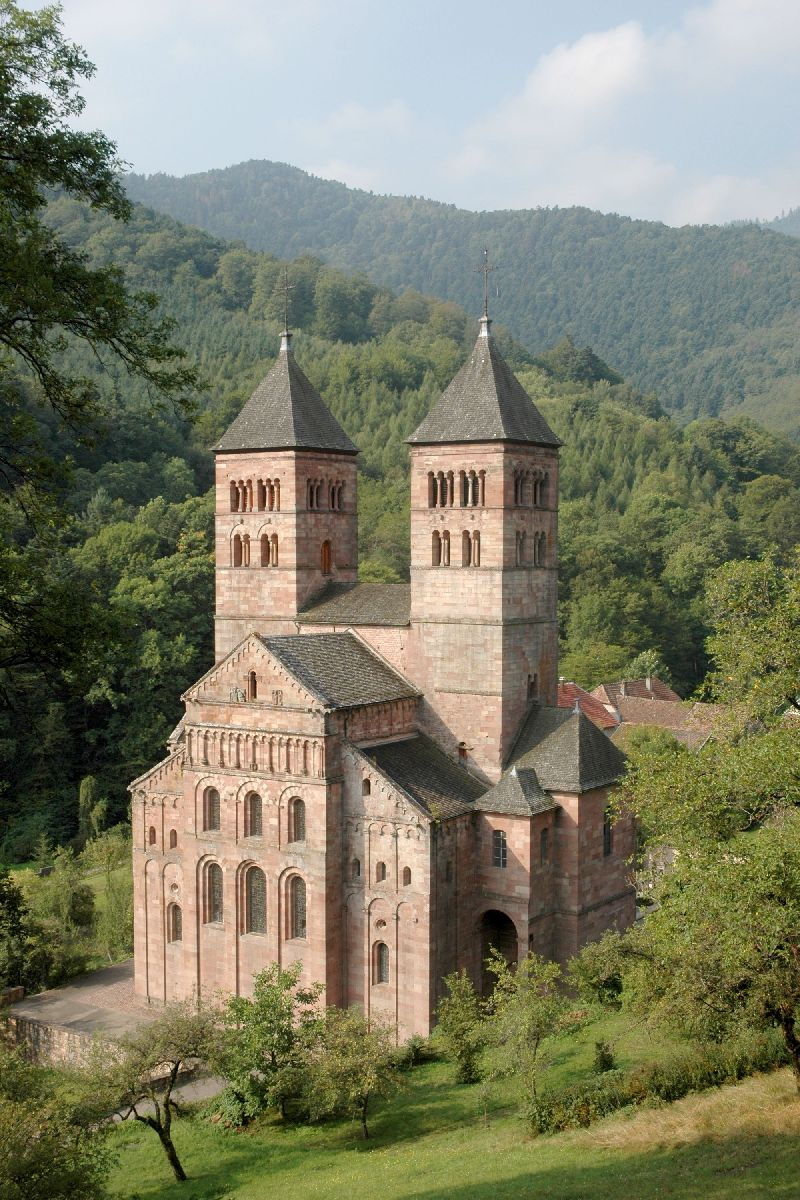
Murbach Abbey

- Madion Abbey (Abbaye Notre-Dame de Madion), monks, Diocese of Saintes (Virollet, Charente-Maritime)
- Madiran Abbey (Abbaye de Madiran), monks (Madiran, Hautes-Pyrénées)
- Maillezais Abbey (Abbaye de Maillezais or Abbaye Saint-Pierre de Maillezais), Diocese of Poitiers (Maillezais, Vendée)
- Malnoue Abbey (Abbaye de Malnoue), nuns, Diocese of Paris (Émerainville, Seine-et-Marne)
- Manglieu Abbey or Manlieu Abbey (Abbaye Notre-Dame de Manglieu or Manlieu), monks, Diocese of Clermont (Manglieu, Puy-de-Dôme)
- Le Mans (Sarthe), Diocese of Le Mans:
  - Abbey of Saint-Pierre de la Couture or Abbey of St Peter, Le Mans (Abbaye Saint-Pierre-de-la-Couture au Mans)
  - Abbey of St Vincent, Le Mans (Abbaye Saint-Vincent du Mans), monks
- Marchiennes Abbey (Abbaye de Marchiennes), monks, Diocese of Arras (Marchiennes, Nord)
- Marcilhac Abbey (Abbaye Saint-Pierre de Marcilhac), monks, Diocese of Cahors (Marcilhac-sur-Célé, Lot)
- Marmoutier Abbey, Tours (Abbaye de Marmoutier or Abbaye Saint-Martin de Marmoutier), monks, Diocese of Tours (Tours, Indre-et-Loire)
- Marmoutier Abbey (Alsace) (Abbaye de Marmoutier), monks (Marmoutier, Bas-Rhin)
- Marnes Abbey or Saint-Jouin-de-Marnes Abbey (Abbaye de Marnes or Abbaye de Saint-Jouin-de-Marnes) monks, Diocese of Poitiers (Marnes, Deux-Sèvres)
- Maroilles Abbey (Abbaye de Maroilles), monks, Diocese of Cambrai (Maroilles, Nord)
- Marseille (Bouches-du-Rhône), Diocese of Marseille:
  - Abbey of St Victor, Marseille (Abbaye de Saint-Victor de Marseille), monks
  - Marseille Priory, otherwise Priory of St Madeleine, Marseille (Prieuré Saint-Madeleine de Marseille): see Hautecombe Abbey
- Le Mas-d'Azil Abbey (Abbaye du Mas-d'Azil), monks, Diocese of Rieux (Le Mas-d'Azil, Arièges)
- Mas-Grenier Abbey (Abbaye Saint-Pierre du Mas-Grenier), monks, now nuns, Diocese of Toulouse (Mas-Grenier, Tarn-et-Garonne)
- Massay Abbey (Abbaye Saint-Martin de Massay), monks, Diocese of Bourges (Massay, Cher)
- Maubeuge Abbey (Abbaye de Maubeuge), nuns, Diocese of Cambrai (Maubeuge, Nord)
- Maumont Abbey (Abbaye Sainte-Marie de Maumont), nuns (Juignac, Charente)
- Maurs Abbey (Abbaye Saint-Césaire de Maurs), monks, Diocese of Saint-Flour (Maurs, Cantal)
- Maursmunster Abbey, monks, see Marmoutier Abbey (Alsace)
- Mauzac Abbey, see Mozac Abbey
- Maylis Abbey (Abbaye Notre-Dame de Maylis), monks (Maylis, Landes)
- Maymac Abbey, see Meymac Abbey
- Melun Abbey (Abbaye Saint-Pierre de Melun), monks, Diocese of Sens (Melun, Seine-et-Marne)
- Menat Abbey (Abbaye Saint-Sauveur, Notre-Dame et Saint-Martin de Menat), monks, Diocese of Clermont (Menat, Puy-de-Dôme)
- Méobecq Abbey otherwise Meaubec Abbey (Abbaye Saint-Pierre et Saint-Paul de Méobecq or Abbaye de Méobecq or Meaubec) Diocese of Bourges (Méobecq, Indre)
- Metz (Moselle), Diocese of Metz:
  - Abbey of St Glossindis, Metz (Abbaye Sainte-Glossinde de Metz), nuns
  - Abbey of St Symphorian, Metz (Abbaye Saint-Symphorien de Metz), monks
  - Abbey of St Vincent, Metz (Abbaye Saint-Vincent de Metz), monks
- Meymac Abbey or Maymac Abbey (Abbaye Saint-André de Meymac or Abbaye Saint-André et Saint-Léger de Meymac) (Meymac, Corrèze)
- Micy Abbey (Abbaye de Micy or Abbaye Saint-Mesmin de Micy), monks, Diocese of Orléans (Saint-Pryvé-Saint-Mesmin, Loiret)
- Moiremont Abbey otherwise Moirmont Abbey (Abbaye de Moiremont or Abbaye Saint Calocère et Saint-Parthénius de Moiremont or Moirmont), monks, Diocese of Châlons-sur-Marne (Moiremont, Marne)
- Moissac Abbey (Abbaye de Moissac, Abbaye de Saint-Pierre de Moissac or Abbaye Saint-Pierre et Saint-Paul de Moissac), monks, Diocese of Cahors (Moissac, Tarn-et-Garonne)
- Molesme Abbey (Abbaye Notre-Dame de Molesme), monks, Diocese of Langres (Molesme, Côte-d'Or)
- Mollégès Abbey (Abbaye Sainte-Marie de Mollégès) (Mollégès, Bouches-du-Rhône)
- Monastère Saint-Benoît (Monastère Saint-Benoît de Brignoles), monks, Diocese Fréjus-Toulon (Brignoles, Var)
- Monastier-Saint-Chaffre Abbey (Abbaye du Monastier-Saint-Chaffre), monks, Diocese of Le Puy (Le Monastier-sur-Gazeille, Haute-Loire)
- Mont-Saint-Michel Abbey (Abbaye du Mont-Saint-Michel), monks, Diocese of Avranches (Mont-Saint-Michel, Manche)
- Mont-Saint-Quentin Abbey (Abbaye du Mont-Saint-Quentin), monks, Diocese of Noyon (Péronne, Somme)
- Montceau Abbey (Abbaye Saint-Félix de Montceau), nuns, Diocese of Montpellier (Gigean, Hérault)
- Montebourg Abbey (Abbaye de Montebourg or Abbaye Sainte-Marie de Montebourg), monks, Diocese of Coutances (Montebourg, Manche)
- Montier-en-Der Abbey (Abbaye de Montier-en-Der or Montiérender), monks, Diocese of Châlons-sur-Marne (Montier-en-Der, Haute-Marne)
- Montier-la-Celle Abbey (Abbaye de Montier-la-Celle), monks, Diocese of Troyes (Saint-André-les-Vergers, Aube)
- Montiéramey Abbey (Abbaye de Montiéramey), monks (Montiéramey, Aube)
- Montierneuf Abbey (Abbaye Saint-Jean de Montierneuf), monks, Diocese of Poitiers (Poitiers, Vienne)
- Montivilliers Abbey (Abbaye de Montivilliers), nuns, later monks, later nuns again, Diocese of Rouen (?-1792) (Montivilliers, Seine-Maritime)
- Montmajour Abbey (Abbaye de Montmajour or Abbaye Saint-Pierre de Montmajour), monks, Diocese of Arles (Arles, Bouches-du-Rhône)
- Montmartre Abbey (Abbaye de Montmartre), nuns, Diocese of Paris (Montmartre, 18th arrondissement, Paris)
- Montolieu Abbey or Montolivet Abbey (Abbaye Saint-Jean-Baptiste de Montolieu or Montolivet), Diocese of Carcassonne (Montolieu, Aude)
- Montsalvy Abbey (Abbaye de Montsalvy or Abbaye Notre-Dame-de-l'Assomption de Montsalvy), monks, Diocese of Saint-Flour (Montsalvy, Cantal)
- Montsort Priory (Prieuré de Montsort), nuns, Diocese of Le Mans (Montsort in Alençon, Orne)
- Moreaux Abbey (Abbaye de Moreaux), monks, Diocese of Poitiers (Champagné, Sarthe)
- Moreuil Abbey (Abbaye de Moreuil, Abbaye Saint-Vaast de Moreuil), monks, Diocese of Amiens (Moreuil, Somme)
- Morienval Abbey (Abbaye Notre Dame de Morienval), nuns, Diocese of Soissons (Morienval, Oise)
- Morigny Abbey (Abbaye Sainte-Trinité de Morigny), monks, Diocese of Sens (Morigny-Champigny, Essonne)
- Moutiers-Saint-Jean Abbey or the Abbey of Saint-Jean-de-Réome (Abbaye de Moutiers-Saint-Jean or Abbaye Saint-Jean-de-Réome), monks, Diocese of Langres (Moutiers-Saint-Jean, Côte-d'Or)
- Mouzon Abbey (Abbaye Notre-Dame de Mouzon), monks, Diocese of Reims (Mouzon, Ardennes)
- Moyenmoutier Abbey otherwise St. Hydulphe's Abbey (Abbaye de Moyen-Moutier or Abbaye Saint-Hydulphe de Moyenmoutier), monks, Diocese of Saint-Dié (Moyenmoutier, Vosges)
- Mozac Abbey or Mauzac Abbey (Abbaye de Mozac or Abbaye Saint-Pierre et Saint-Caprais de Mozac) (Mozac, Puy-de-Dôme)
- Munster Abbey otherwise Münster Abbey (Abbaye de Munster or Münster), monks (Munster, Haut-Rhin)
- Murbach Abbey (Abbaye de Murbach), monks (Murbach, Haut-Rhin)

== N ==
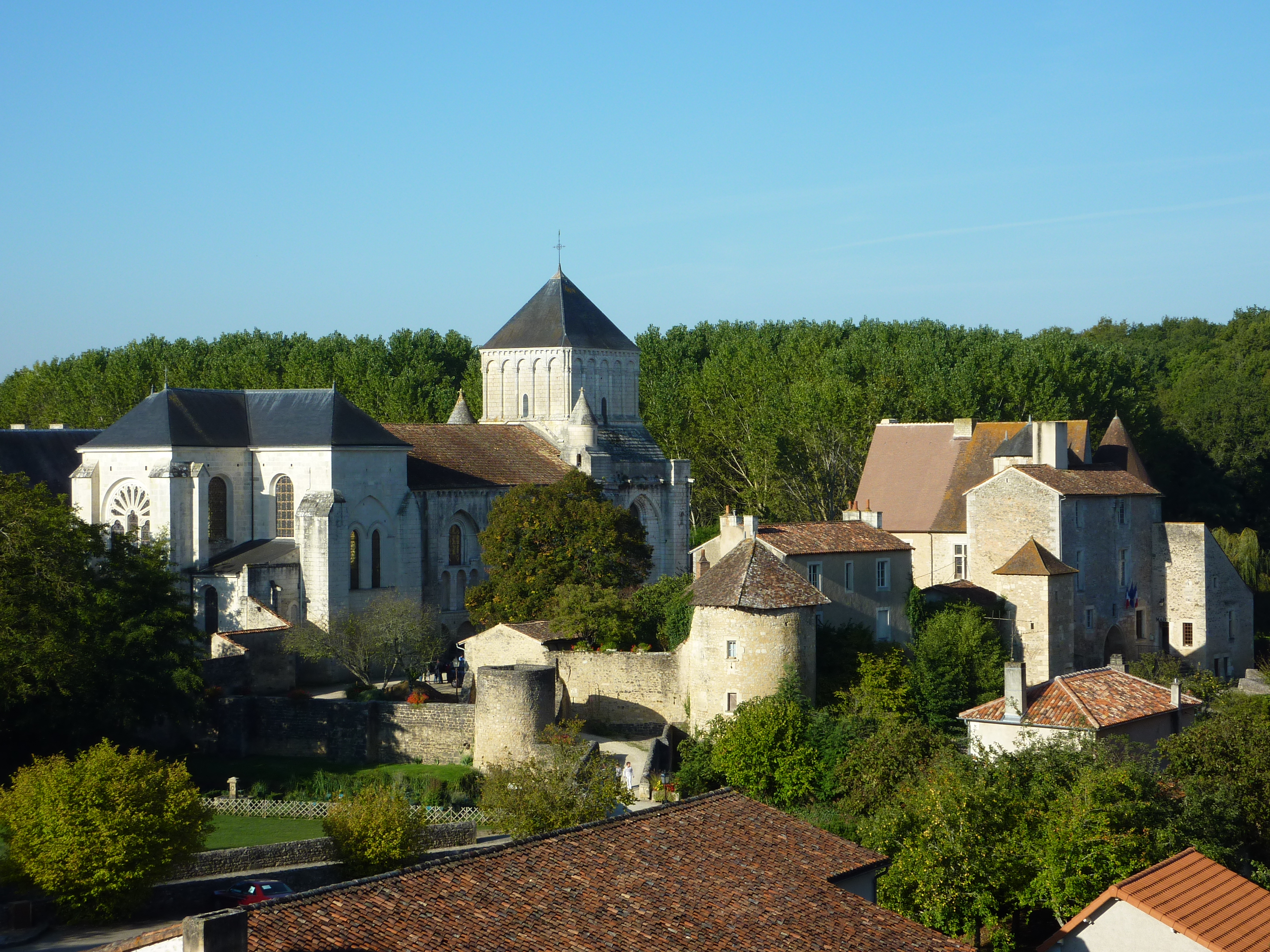
Nouaillé-Maupertuis Abbey

- Abbey of St Leopold, Nancy (Abbaye Saint-Léopold de Nancy), monks, Diocese of Toul, now Diocese of Nancy (Nancy, Meurthe-et-Moselle)
- Nant Abbey or Nantz Abbey (Abbaye Saint-Pierre de Nant or Nantz), monks, Diocese of Vabres (Nant, Aveyron)
- Nanteuil Abbey (Abbaye Notre-Dame de Nanteuil-en-Vallée), monks, Diocese of Poitiers (?-1770) (Nanteuil-en-Vallée, Charente)
- Neauphle Abbey (Abbaye de Neauphle-le-Vieux or l'Aivieux), monks, Diocese of Chartres (Neauphle-le-Vieux, Yvelines)
- Nesle Abbey otherwise Nielle Abbey (Abbaye Notre-Dame de Nesle-la-Reposte or Nielle), monks, Diocese of Troyes (Nesle-la-Reposte, Marne)
- Neufbourg Abbey or Neubourg Abbey (Abbaye de Neubourg, Abbaye Notre-Dame et Saint-Jean-Baptiste de Neufbourg), nuns, Diocese of Évreux (1637- ) (Le Neufbourg, Eure)
- Neuwiller Abbey (Abbaye Saint-Pierre et Saint-Paul de Neuwiller-lès-Saverne) (Neuwiller-lès-Saverne, Bas-Rhin)
- Nevers Abbey (Abbaye Notre-Dame de Nevers), nuns, Diocese of Nevers (Nevers, Nièvre)
- Nid-du-Merle Abbey (Abbaye Notre-Dame du Nid-de-Merle), Diocese of Rennes (Saint-Sulpice-la-Forêt, Ille-et-Vilaine)
- Nogent Abbey (Abbaye de Nogent-sous-Coucy or Abbaye Notre-Dame de Nogent-sous-Coucy), monks, Diocese of Laon (Coucy-le-Château-Auffrique, Aisne)
- Nogent (Aube), see Abbaye du Paraclet, Quincey
- Nouaillé Abbey (Abbaye de Nouaillé or Abbaye Saint-Junien de Nouaillé), monks, Diocese of Poitiers (Nouaillé-Mau (pertuis), Vienne)
- Noirmoutier Abbey or Abbey of St Philibert, Noirmoutier (Abbaye Saint-Philibert de Noirmoutier), monks, Diocese of Luçon (founded 674; repeatedly destroyed; community in exile eventually founded the Abbey of St. Philibert, Tournus, 875) (Noirmoutier, Vendée)
- Noyers Abbey (Abbaye Notre-Dame de Noyers), monks, Diocese of Tours (1030-1791) (Nouâtre, Indre-et-Loire)
- Noyon Abbey (Abbaye Saint-Éloi de Noyon), monks, Diocese of Noyon (Noyon, Oise)
- Nyoiseau Abbey otherwise Nioiseau Abbey (Abbaye de Nyoiseau or Nioiseau), nuns, Diocese of Angers (Nyoiseau, Maine-et-Loire)

== O ==
- Orbais Abbey (Abbaye d'Orbais), monks, Diocese of Soissons (Orbais-l'Abbaye, Marne)
- Orbestier Abbey (Abbaye Saint-Jean d'Orbestier or Abbaye Saint-Jean-Baptiste d'Orbestier), Diocese of Luçon (Château-d'Olonne, Vendée)
- Origny Abbey (Abbaye d'Origny), nuns, Diocese of Laon (Origny-Sainte-Benoite, Aisne)
- Oriocourt Abbey (Abbaye du Sacré-Coeur d'Oriocourt), nuns (Delme, Moselle)
- Ouche Abbey (Abbaye d'Ouche), see Abbaye de Saint-Évroult

== P ==
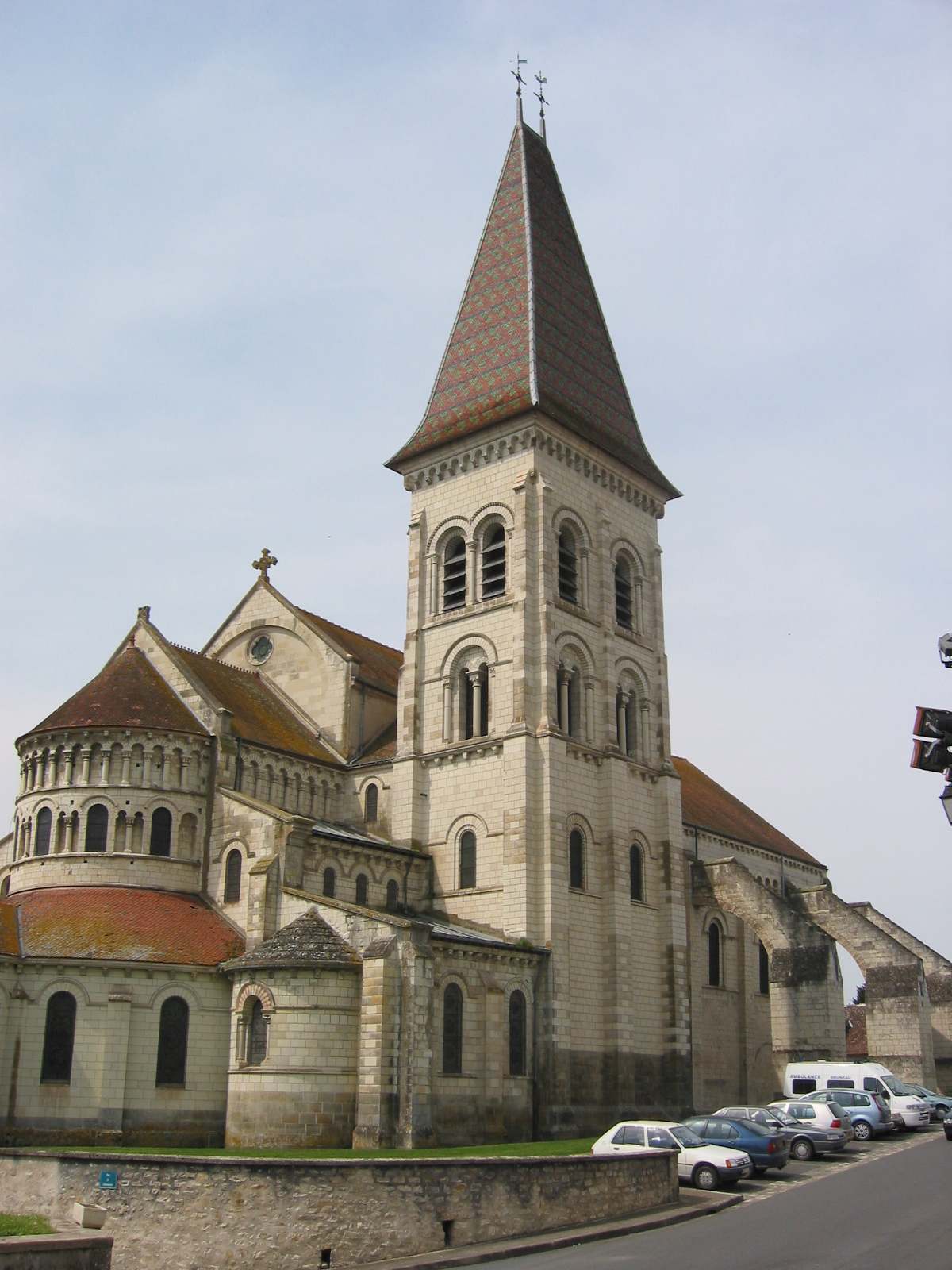
Preuilly Abbey

- Pacy Abbey (Abbaye de l'Annonciation de Pacy), nuns, Diocese of Évreux (Pacy-sur-Eure, Eure)
- Abbaye du Paraclet, Quincey, otherwise Nogent (Abbaye du Paraclet, Quincey; or Abbaye du Paraclet, Nogent) nuns, Diocese of Troyes (Ferreux-Quincey near Nogent-sur-Aube, Aube)
- Paris:
  - Priory of St Edmund, Paris (Prieuré Saint-Edmond de Paris), English monks in exile (1615–1791); re-established at Douai 1818–1903
  - Abbey of St. Mary, Paris or Abbaye de la Source (Abbaye Sainte-Marie de Paris, Abbaye de la Source), monks (1893-2021)
- Pavilly Abbey (Abbaye de Pavilly) (Pavilly, Seine-Maritime)
- La Plisse Abbey (Abbaye Notre-Dame de la Pelice or Pélice), monks, Diocese of Le Mans (La Plisse, Cherreau, Sarthe)
- Abbey of Notre-Dame du Pesquié (Abbaye Notre-Dame du Pesquié), nuns (Foix, Ariège)
- Pessan Abbey (Abbaye Saint-Michel de Pessan), monks, Diocese of Auch (?-1768) (Pessan, Gers)
- Abbey of la Pierre-qui-Vire (Abbaye de la Pierre-qui-Vire or Abbaye Sainte-Marie de la Pierre-qui-Vire), monks (Saint-Léger-Vauban, Yonne)
- Pimbo Abbey (Abbaye de Pimbo), Diocese of Aire (Pimbo, Landes)
- Poitiers (Vienne), Diocese of Poitiers:
  - St Cross Abbey, Poitiers (Abbaye Sainte-Croix de Poitiers), nuns, (?-? and 1807–1965)
  - Abbey of St Cyprian, Poitiers (Abbaye Saint-Cyprien de Poitiers), monks
  - Abbey of the Holy Trinity, Poitiers (Abbaye Sainte-Trinité de Poitiers), nuns
- Pontlevoy Abbey (Abbaye Notre-Dame de Pontlevoy), monks, Diocese of Chartres (Pontlevoy, Loir-et-Cher)
- Pontoise Abbey (Abbaye Saint-Martin de Pontoise), monks, Diocese of Rouen (Pontoise, Val-d'Oise)
- Pothières Abbey (Abbaye de Pothières), monks, Diocese of Langres, later Diocese of Dijon (Pothières, Côte-d'Or)
- Poulangy Abbey otherwise Poulengy Abbey (Abbaye de Poulangy or Abbaye royale de Poulangy or Poulengy), nuns, Diocese of Langres (Poulangy, Haute-Marne)
- Poussay Abbey (Abbaye de Poussay), nuns, Diocese of Toul (Poussay, Vosges)
- Poyanne Abbey (Abbaye Saint-Eustase de Poyanne), nuns (?-? and 1865-) (Poyanne, Landes)
- Pradines Abbey (Abbaye Saint-Joseph et Saint-Pierre de Pradines) (Pradines, Loire)
- Prâlon Abbey or Praslon Abbey (Abbaye de Prâlon or Praslon), nuns, Diocese of Langres (Prâlon, Côte-d'Or)
- Abbaye Notre-Dame-du-Pré at Valmont, see Valmont Abbey
- Les Préaux (Eure), Diocese of Lisieux:
  - Préaux Abbey (Abbaye Saint-Pierre de Préaux), monks
  - Abbey of St Leger, Préaux (Abbaye Saint-Léger de Préaux), nuns
- Preuilly Abbey (Abbaye Saint-Pierre de Preuilly), monks, Diocese of Tours (Preuilly-sur-Claise, Indre-et-Loire)
- Provins Abbey (Abbaye Saint-Jacques de Provins), nuns, Diocese of Sens (Provins, Seine-et-Marne)
- Psalmody Abbey (Abbaye de Psalmody, Psalmodi or Psalmodie), monks (Saint-Laurent-d'Aigouze, Gard)
- Puits-d'Orbe Abbey (Abbaye du Puits-d'Orbe), nuns, Diocese of Langres (Verdonnet, Côte-d'Or)

== Q ==
- Quincey, see Abbaye du Paraclet
- Quimperlé Abbey (Abbaye Sainte-Croix de Quimperlé), monks, Diocese of Quimper (Quimperlé, Finistère)
- Quinçay Abbey (Abbaye Saint-Benoît de Quinçay), monks, Diocese of Poitiers (Quinçay, Vienne)

== R ==
- Randol Abbey (Abbaye Notre-Dame de Randol), monks (1981-) (Saint-Saturnin, Puy-de-Dôme)
- La Réole Priory or La Réaule Priory (Prieuré de La Réole or de la Réaule), monks, Diocese of Lescar (La Réole, Gironde)
- Rebais Abbey (Abbaye Saint-Pierre de Rebais), monks, Diocese of Meaux (Rebais, Seine-et-Marne)
- Redon Abbey (Abbaye Saint-Sauveur de Redon), monks (832-1790), Diocese of Vannes (Redon, Ille-et-Vilaine)
- Reims (Marne), Diocese of Reims:
  - St Nicasius' Abbey, Reims (Abbaye Saint-Nicaise de Reims), monks
  - St Peter's Abbey, Reims (Abbaye Saint-Pierre de Reims), nuns
  - St Remigius' Abbey, Reims (Abbaye Saint-Remi de Reims, later Basilique Saint-Remi de Reims), monks
  - St Thierri's Abbey, Reims (Abbaye Saint-Thierri de Reims), monks
  - St Timothy's Abbey, Reims (Abbaye Saint-Thimotée de Reims)
- Remiremont Abbey (Abbaye Saint-Pierre de Remiremont or Saint-Mont), double monastery (monks and nuns), Diocese of Toul later Diocese of Saint-Dié (Remiremont, Vosges)
- Rennes (Ille-et-Vilaine), Diocese of Rennes:
  - Abbey of St George, Rennes (Abbaye Saint-Georges de Rennes), nuns
  - Abbey of St Melaine, Rennes (Abbaye Saint-Melaine de Rennes), monks
- Rhuys Abbey or Saint-Gildas-de-Rhuys Abbey (Abbaye Saint-Gildas de Rhuys), monks, Diocese of Vannes (Saint-Gildas-de-Rhuys, Morbihan)
- Ribemont Abbey (Abbaye Saint-Nicolas-des-Prés de Ribemont), monks, Diocese of Laon (Ribemont, Aisne)
- Rocamadour Abbey or Roquamadour Abbey (Abbaye Notre-Dame de Rocamadour or Roquemadour), administratively in the Diocese of Tulle but situated in the Diocese of Cahors (Rocamadour, Lot)
- La Rochette Abbey or Abbey of St Joseph de La Rochette (Abbaye Saint-Joseph de La Rochette, Abbaye de La Rochette), nuns (Belmont-Tramonet, Savoie); founded in 1824 at the Château de la Rochette in Cuire-le-Bas, Caluire-et-Cuire (Rhône); became an abbey in 1837; moved to Belmont-Tramonet in 1970
- Abbey of St Saturnin, Rodez (Abbaye Saint-Saturnin de Rodez or Abbaye de Saint-Sernin de Rodez), nuns, Diocese of Rodez (Rodez, Aveyron)
- Ronceray Abbey (Abbaye du Ronceray d'Angers or Abbaye Notre-Dame du Ronceray), nuns, Diocese of Angers (1028-?) (Angers, Maine-et-Loire)
- Abbaye Notre-Dame de Miséricorde de Rosans, nuns, Diocese of Gap (founded 1991) (Rosans, Hautes-Alpes)
- Abbey of Our Lady of the Sacred Heart, Rosheim (Abbaye Notre-Dame-du-Sacré-Cœur de Rosheim), nuns (Rosheim, Bas-Rhin)
- Rouen (Seine-Maritime), Diocese of Rouen:
  - Abbey of St Amand, Rouen (Abbaye Saint-Amand de Rouen), nuns
  - Abbey of St Ouen, Rouen (Abbaye Saint-Ouen de Rouen), monks
- Rougemont Abbey (Abbaye Notre-Dame de Rougemont), nuns, Diocese of Dijon (moved to Dijon 1673) (Rougemont, Côte-d'Or)
- Royallieu Abbey or Royal-Lieu Abbey (Abbaye de Royallieu or Royal-Lieu), nuns, Diocese of Soissons (Compiègne, Oise)

== S ==
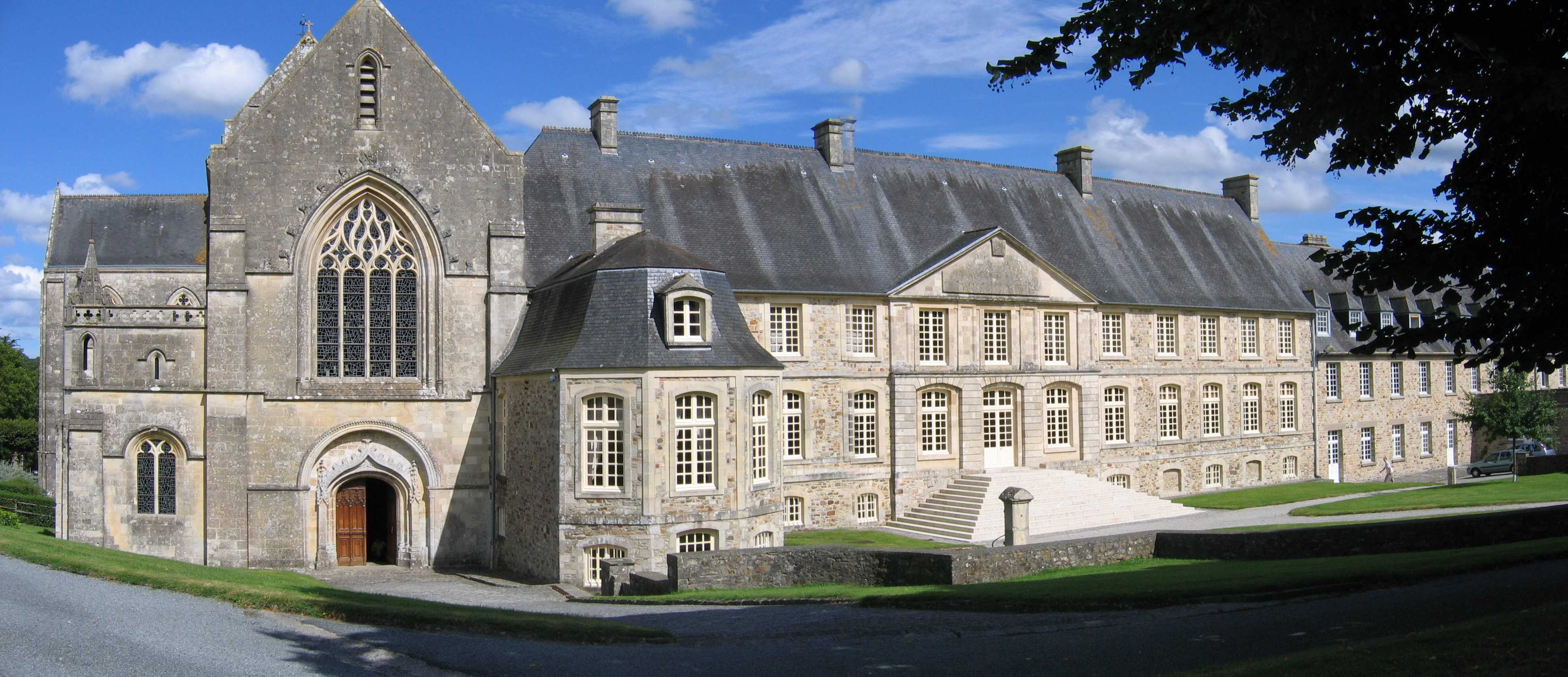
Abbey of Saint-Sauveur-le-Vicomte

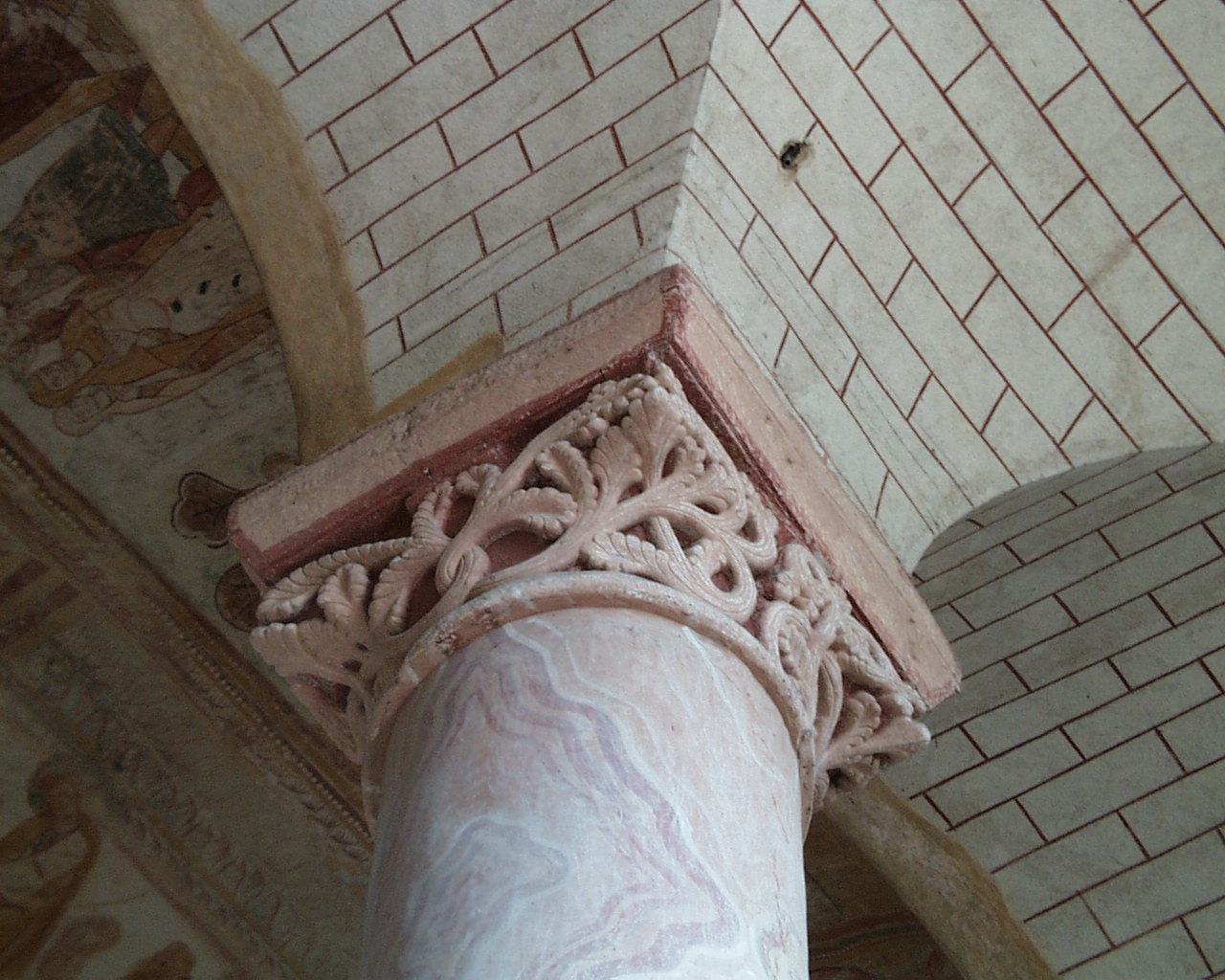
Abbey of Saint-Savin-sur-Gartempe

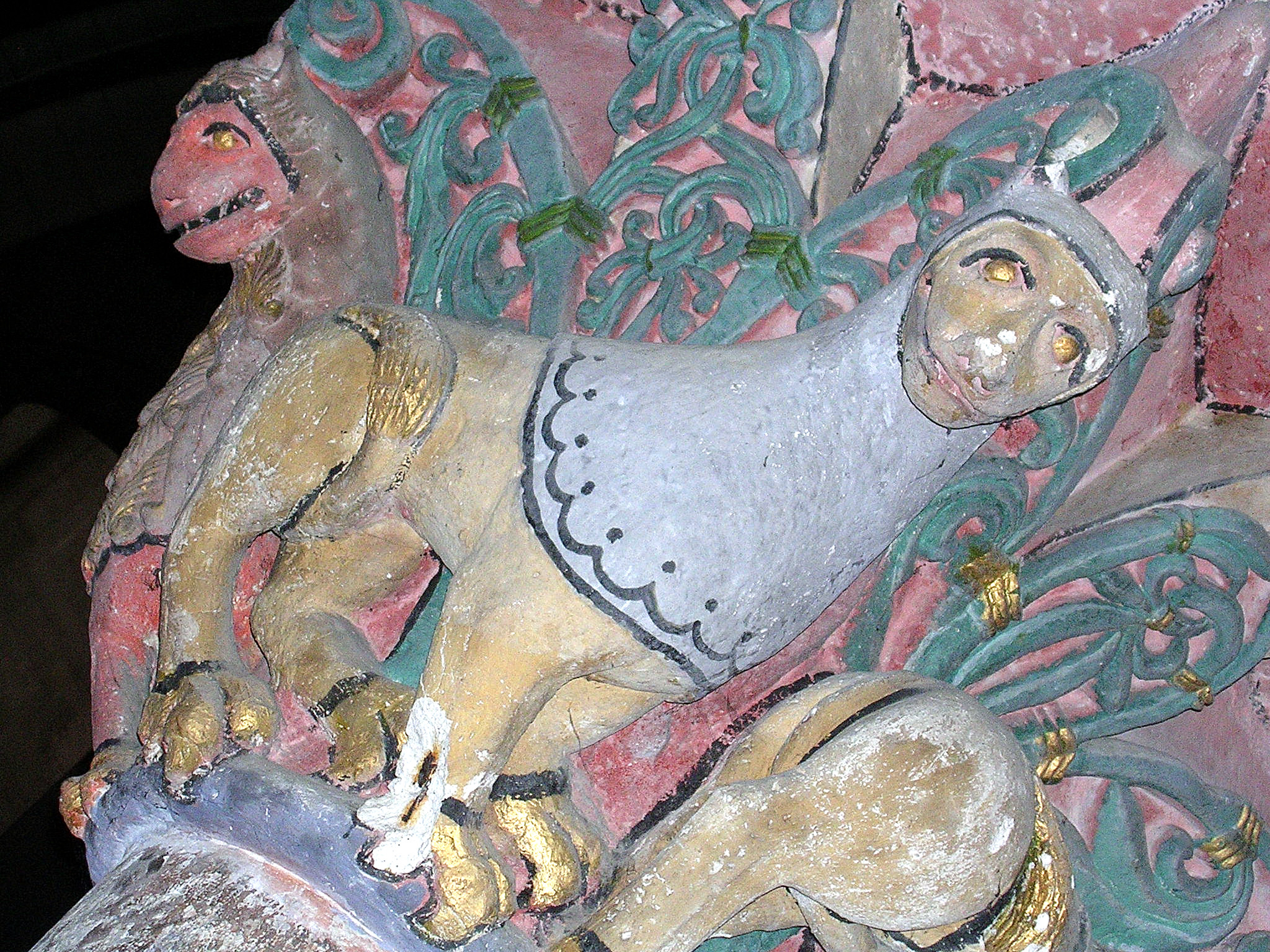
Saint-Sever Abbey

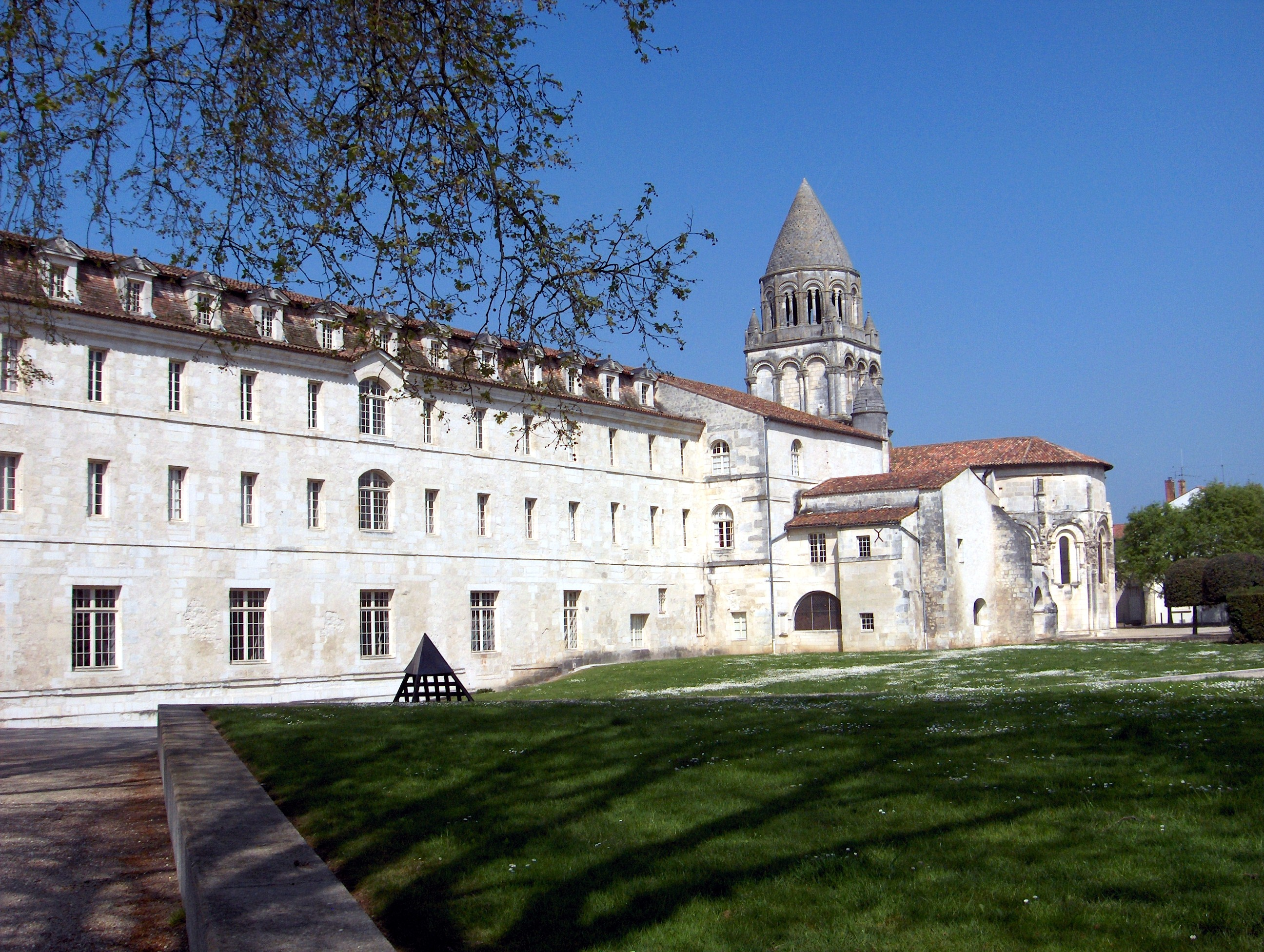
Abbaye aux Dames, Saintes

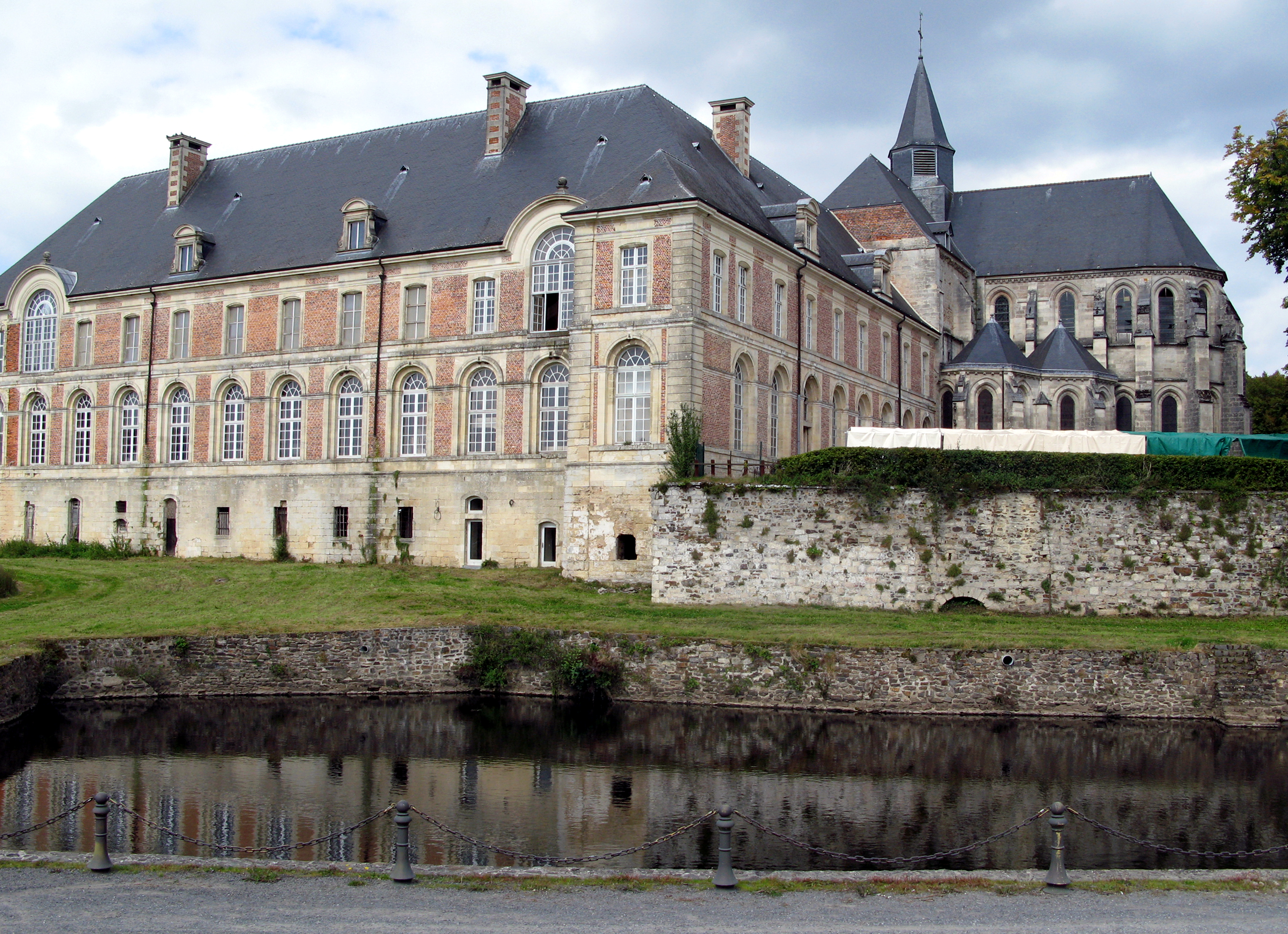
Abbey of Saint-Michel-en-Thiérache

- Sagne Abbey, see Vielmur Abbey
- Abbey of St Airy, Verdun (Abbaye Saint-Airy), monks, Diocese of Verdun (Verdun, Meuse)
- Abbey of St Alyre or St Allyre (Abbaye de Saint-Alyre or Allyre), monks, Diocese of Clermont (Clairmont, now Clermont-Ferrand, Puy-de-Dôme)
- Saint-Amand Abbey otherwise Elnon(e) Abbey (Abbaye de Saint-Amand or d'Elnon(e)), monks, Diocese of Tournai, (630s-1789) (Saint-Amand-les-Eaux, Nord)
- St Amand's Abbey, Rouen, see Rouen
- Abbaye de la Paix de Saint-Amand, nuns, Diocese of Tournai (Saint-Amand-les-Eaux, Nord)
- Abbey of Saint-Amant-de-Boixe (Abbaye de Saint-Amant-de-Boixe), monks, Diocese of Angoulême (about 1020-?) (Saint-Amant-de-Boixe, Charente)
- Saint-André Abbey (Abbaye de Saint-André), monks (Saint-André, Pyrénées-Orientales)
- Abbey of St Andrew, Avignon, see Avignon
- Priory of Saint-Arnoul, see Lay Priory
- Abbey of St Arnould (Abbaye de Saint-Arnould, Saint-Arnoul, etc.), monks, Diocese of Metz (Metz, Moselle)
- St Nabor's Abbey, Saint-Avold (Abbaye Saint-Nabor de Saint-Avold), monks, Diocese of Metz (Saint-Avold, Moselle)
- St Cross Abbey, Saint-Benoît (Abbaye Sainte-Croix de Saint-Benoît), nuns, Diocese of Poitiers (1965-) (La Cossonnière, Saint-Benoît, Vienne)
- Abbey of Saint-Benoît-sur-Loire, see Fleury Abbey
- Abbey of St Bertin, see Saint-Omer
- Saint-Calais Abbey (Abbaye de Saint-Calais), monks, Diocese of Le Mans (Saint-Calais-du-Désert, Mayenne)
- Abbey of St Chaffre (Abbaye de Saint-Chaffre-le-Monastier), monks, Diocese of Le Puy (Le Monastier-sur-Gazeille, Haute-Loire)
- Saint-Chinian Abbey or Abbey of St Aignan, Saint-Chinian (Abbaye de Saint-Chinian or Abbaye Saint-Aignan de Saint-Chinian), monks, Diocese of Saint-Pons (Saint-Chinian, Hérault)
- St Clement's Abbey, Metz (Abbaye Saint-Clément de Metz), monks, Diocese of Metz (Pontiffroy, Metz, Moselle)
- Abbey of St Corentin or Abbey of Saint-Corentin-lès-Mantes (Abbaye Saint-Corentin, Abbaye de Saint-Corentin-lès-Mantes), nuns, Diocese of Chartres (Saint-Corentin in Septeuil, Yvelines)
- Abbey of Saint-Crespin-le-Grand (Abbaye Saint-Crespin-le-Grand), monks, Diocese of Soissons (Soissons, Aisne)
- Abbey of St Denis (Cathédrale Saint-Denis or Abbaye de Saint-Denis), monks, Diocese of Paris (Saint-Denis, Seine-Saint-Denis)
- St Eusebius's Abbey, Saignon (Abbaye Saint-Eusèbe), monks, Diocese of Apt (Saignon, Vaucluse)
- St Eustace's Abbey (Abbaye Saint-Eustase de Vergaville, previously Abbaye Notre-Dame de Vergaville), nuns (Vergaville, Moselle)
- Saint-Évroult Abbey (Abbaye de Saint-Évroult, Abbaye de Saint-Évroult d'Ouche or Abbaye Notre-Dame-du-Bois de Saint-Évroult), monks, Diocese of Sées later Lisieux (Saint-Evroult-Notre-Dame-du-Bois, Orne)
- Abbey of St Faron (Abbaye Saint-Faron de Meaux, Abbaye Sainte-Croix de Saint-Faron), monks, Diocese of Meaux (Saint-Faron, Meaux, Seine-et-Marne)
- Saint-Ferme Abbey (Abbaye de Saint-Ferme), monks, Diocese of Bazas, in Bazadais (Saint-Ferme, Gironde)
- Abbey of Saint-Florent, Saint-Florent-le-Jeune or Saint-Florent-lès-Saumur (Abbaye Saint-Florent, Abbaye Saint-Florent-le-Jeune, Abbaye Saint-Florent-lès-Saumur), monks, Diocese of Angers (Saumur, Maine-et-Loire)
- Abbey of Saint-Florent-le-Vieil, Saint-Florent-sur-Loire or Saint-Florent du Mont-Glonne (Abbaye de Saint-Florent-le-Vieil, Abbaye Saint-Florent-sur-Loire, Abbaye Saint-Florent du Mont-Glonne), monks, Diocese of Angers (Saint-Florent-le-Vieil, Maine-et-Loire)
- Abbey of Saint-Fuscien-au-Bois (Abbaye de Saint-Fuscien-au-Bois), monks, Diocese of Amiens (Saint-Fuscien, Somme)
- Saint-Geniès Abbey (Abbaye de Saint-Geniès), nuns, Diocese of Montpellier (Saint-Geniès-des-Mourgues, Hérault)
- Abbey of Saint-Génis-des-Fontaines (Abbaye de Saint-Génis-des-Fontaines or Abbaye Saint-Michel de Saint-Génis-des-Fontaines) (Saint-Génis-des-Fontaines, Pyrénées-Orientales)
- Saint-Genou Abbey or Abbey of Saint-Genou-de-Saint-Genou or of Saint-Genou-de-l'Estrée (Abbaye Saint-Genou de Saint-Genou or de Saint-Genou-de-l'Estrée), monks, Diocese of Bourges (Saint-Genou, Indre)
- Abbey of Saint-Germain-des-Prés (Abbaye de Saint-Germain-des-Prés or Abbaye Sainte-Croix et Saint-Vincent de Saint-Germain-des-Prés), monks, Diocese of Paris (Quartier Saint-Germain-des-Prés, 6th arrondissement, Paris); seat of the Congregation of St. Maur (1631-?)
- Abbey of Saint-Germer-de-Fly (Abbaye de Saint-Germer-de-Fly), monks, Diocese of Beauvais (Saint-Germer-de-Fly, Oise)
- Saint-Girons Abbey (Abbaye de Saint-Girons), Diocese of Aire (Hagetmau, Landes)
- Abbey of Saint-Gildas-de-Bois (Abbaye de Saint-Gildas-de-Bois), monks, Diocese of Nantes (Saint-Gildas-des-Bois, Loire-Atlantique)
- Abbey of Saint-Gilles-du-Gard otherwise Saint-Gilles Abbey (Abbaye de Saint-Gilles), monks, Diocese of Nîmes (?-1538) (Saint-Gilles, Gard)
- Abbey of Saint-Guilhem-le-Désert otherwise Gellone Abbey (Abbaye de Saint-Guilhem-le-Désert or Abbaye de Gellone), monks, Diocese of Lodève (Saint-Guilhem-le-Désert, Hérault)
- Saint-Hilaire Abbey (Abbaye de Saint-Hilaire), monks, Diocese of Carcassonne (Saint-Hilaire, Aude)
- St Hydulphe's Abbey, see Moyenmoutier Abbey
- Saint-Jacut Abbey (Abbaye de Saint-Jacut), monks, Diocese of Dol (Saint-Jacut-de-la-Mer, Côtes-d'Armor)
- Abbey of Saint-Jean-d'Angély (Abbaye de Saint-Jean-d'Angély), monks, Diocese of Saintes (Saint-Jean-d'Angély, Charente-Maritime)
- Abbey of Saint-Jean-des-Choux or Abbey of St John the Baptist, Saint-Jean-des-Choux (Abbaye de Saint-Jean-des-Choux, Abbaye Saint-Jean-Baptiste de Saint-Jean-des-Choux), nuns, Diocese of Strasbourg (Saint-Jean-Saverne, Bas-Rhin)
- Abbey of Saint-Jean-du-Mont (Abbaye Saint-Jean-du-Mont), monks, Diocese of Thérouanne (Thérouanne, Pas-de-Calais) (destroyed 1537)
- Abbey of Saint-Jean-le-Grand or Abbey of St. Mary of Saint-Jean-le-Grand, Autun (Abbaye Saint-Jean-le-Grand d'Autun or Abbaye Sainte-Marie de Saint-Jean-le-Grand d'Autun), nuns, Diocese of Autun (Autun, Saône-et-Loire)
- Abbey of Saint-Jean-de-Réôme, see Moutiers-Saint-Jean Abbey
- Jocou Abbey (Abbaye Saint-Jacques de Jocou) (near Saint-Paul-de-Fenouillet, Le Razès, Aude)
- Saint-Josse Abbey (Abbaye de Saint-Josse or Abbaye de Saint-Josse-sur-Mer), monks, Diocese of Amiens (Saint-Josse, Pas-de-Calais)
- Abbey of Saint-Jouin-de-Marnes otherwise Marnes Abbey (Abbaye de Marnes or Abbaye de Saint-Jouin-de-Marnes) monks, Diocese of Poitiers (Marnes, Deux-Sèvres)
- Abbey of St Julian (Abbaye Saint-Julien), nuns, Diocese of Auxerre
- Abbey of St Julian, see Tours
- Saint-Laumer Abbey (Abbaye de Saint-Laumer), monks, Diocese of Blois (Blois, Loir-et-Cher)
- Saint-Liguaire Abbey otherwise Saint-Léger Abbey (Abbaye de Saint-Liguaire or Saint-Léger), monks, Diocese of Saintes (Saint-Liguaire in Niort, Deux-Sèvres)
- Abbey of St Lioba (Abbaye Sainte-Lioba) (Simiane-Collongue, Bouches-du-Rhône)
- Saint-Loubouer Abbey (Abbaye de Saint-Loubouer), Diocese of Aire (Saint-Loubouer, Landes)
- Abbey of St Louis, Metz (Abbaye Saint-Louis de Metz), nuns, Diocese of Metz (Metz, Moselle); founded 1761
- Abbey of Saint-Louis-du-Temple, Vauhallan, otherwise Limon (Abbaye Saint-Louis-du-Temple de Vauhallan or Limon), nuns (1951-) (Limon in Vauhallan, Essonne)
- Abbey of Saint-Loup-lès-Orléans or of Saint-Loup-sur-Loire (Abbaye de Saint-Loup-lès-Orléans or Saint-Loup-sur-Loire), nuns, Diocese of Orléans (Saint-Jean-de-Braye, Loiret)
- Saint-Maixent Abbey (Abbaye de Saint-Maixent), monks, Diocese of Poitiers (Saint-Maixent-l'École, Deux-Sèvres)
- Abbey of Saint-Marcel-lès-Chalon (Abbaye Saint-Marcel-lès-Chalon)
- Abbey of St Mary of Saint-Jean-le-Grand of Autun, Colonne (Abbaye Sainte-Marie de Saint-Jean-le-Grand d'Autun à Colonne), nuns, later monks (Colonne, Jura)
- Abbey of Saint-Mathieu de Fine-Terre otherwise Abbey of Saint-Mahé-de-Fine-Terre (Abbaye Saint-Mathieu de Fine-Terre or Abbaye Saint-Mahé-de-Fine-Terre), monks, Diocese of Léon (Plougonvelin, Finistère)
- Abbey of St Maur (Abbaye de Saint-Maur, Abbaye des Fossés or Abbaye de Saint-Maur-des-Fossés), monks (Saint-Maur-des-Fossés, Val-de-Marne)
- Abbey of Saint-Maur-sur-Loire, see Glanfeuil Abbey
- Saint-Maurin Abbey (Abbaye de Saint-Maurin), Diocese of Agen (Saint-Maurin, Lot-et-Garonne)
- Saint-Méen Abbey, formerly Abbey of Saint-Jean-de-Gaël (Abbaye de Saint-Méen, Abbaye de Saint-Jean-de-Gaël), monks, Diocese of Saint-Malo (Saint-Méen-le-Grand, Ille-et-Vilaine)
- Saint-Menoux Abbey otherwise Saint-Menou Abbey (Abbaye de Saint-Menoux or Saint-Menou), nuns, Diocese of Bourges (Saint-Menoux, Allier)
- Abbey of Saint-Michel-en-Thiérache (Abbaye de Saint-Michel-en-Thiérache) (Saint-Michel, Aisne)
- Abbey of Saint-Michel-en-l'Herm (Abbaye de Saint-Michel-en-l'Herm), Diocese of Poitiers (1041-?) (Saint-Michel-en-l'Herm, Vendée)
- Saint-Mihiel Abbey (Abbaye de Saint-Mihiel), monks, Diocese of Verdun (Saint-Mihiel, Meuse)
- Abbey of Saint-Nicolas-au-Bois (Abbaye de Saint-Nicolas-au-Bois), monks, Diocese of Laon (Saint-Nicolas-au-Bois, Aisne)
- Abbey of St Bertin, Saint-Omer, formerly Thérouanne (Abbaye Saint-Bertin de Saint-Omer), monks, Diocese of Saint-Omer (Saint-Omer, formerly Thérouanne, Pas-de-Calais)
- Saint-Papoul Abbey (Abbaye de Saint-Papoul), monks, (Saint-Papoul, Aude)
- Saint-Paul Abbey (Abbaye de Saint-Paul), nuns, Diocese of Beauvais (Saint-Paul, Oise)
- Abbey of Saint-Pé-de-Générès (Abbaye de Saint-Pé-de-Générès), monks, Diocese of Tarbes (Saint-Pé-de-Bigorre, Hautes-Pyrénées)
- Abbey of Saint-Père-en-Vallée (Abbaye de Saint-Père-en-Vallée), monks, Diocese of Chartres (Chartres, Eure-et-Loir)
- Abbey of Saint-Pierre-sur-Dives (Abbaye de Saint-Pierre-sur-Dives), monks, Diocese of Sées (Saint-Pierre-sur-Dives, Calvados)
- Abbey of Saint-Pierre-du-Mont or Saint-Pierre-au-Mont (Abbaye de Saint-Pierre-du-Mont or Saint-Pierre-au-Mont), monks, Diocese of Châlons-sur-Marne (Châlons-en-Champagne, Marne)
- Abbey of Saint-Pierre-le-Vif (Abbaye de Saint-Pierre-le-Vif), monks, Diocese of Sens (Sens, Yonne)
- Saint-Pons Abbey (Abbaye de Saint-Pons, monks, Diocese of Nice (Nice, Alpes-Maritimes)
- Saint-Polycarpe Abbey (Abbaye de Saint-Polycarpe), monks, Diocese of Narbonne (Saint-Polycarpe, Aude)
- Abbey of St Prix (Abbaye de Saint-Prix), monks, Diocese of Noyon (Saint-Quentin, Aisne)
- Abbey of Saint-Quentin-en-l'Isle (Abbaye de Saint-Quentin-en-l'Isle), monks, Diocese of Noyon (Saint-Quentin, Aisne)
- Saint-Rambert Abbey (Abbaye de Saint-Rambert), monks, Diocese of Lyon (Saint-Rambert-en-Bugey, formerly Saint-Rambert de Joux, Ain)
- Abbey of Saint-Rémy-aux-Nonnains (Abbaye de Saint-Rémy-aux-Nonnains), nuns, Diocese of Soissons
- Abbey of Saint-Rémy-des-Landes (Abbaye Saint-Rémi-des-Landes), nuns, Diocese of Chartres (Clairefontaine-en-Yvelines, Yvelines)
- Abbey of St Rigaud or St Rigauld (Abbaye Saint-Rigaud or Saint-Rigauld), Diocese of Dijon (Ligny-en-Brionnais, Saône-et-Loire)
- Saint-Riquier Abbey (Abbaye de Saint-Riquier), monks, Diocese of Amiens (Saint-Riquier, Somme)
- Abbey of Saint-Roman (Abbaye de Saint-Roman), monks (Beaucaire, Gard)
- Saint-Satur Abbey (Abbaye de Saint-Satur), monks (Saint-Satur, Cher)
- Saint-Sauve Abbey or Saint-Saulve Abbey (Abbaye de Saint-Sauve or Saint-Saulve), monks, Diocese of Amiens (Saint-Saulve, Nord)
- Abbey of St Saulve (Abbaye Saint-Saulve), monks (Montreuil-sur-Mer, Pas-de-Calais)
- Abbey of Saint-Sauveur-le-Vicomte (Abbaye de Saint-Sauveur-le-Vicomte), monks, Diocese of Coutances (Saint-Sauveur-le-Vicomte, Manche)
- Abbey of Saint-Savin-en-Lavedan (Abbaye de Saint-Savin-en-Lavedan), monks, Diocese of Tarbes (Saint-Savin, Hautes-Pyrénées)
- Abbey of Saint-Savin-sur-Gartempe (Abbaye de Saint-Savin-sur-Gartempe) (Saint-Savin, Vienne)
- Abbey of Saint-Seine (Abbaye de Saint-Seine), monks, Diocese of Dijon (Saint-Seine-l'Abbaye, Côte-d'Or)
- Abbey of Saint-Sever-Calvados (Abbaye de Saint-Sever-Calvados, Abbey Notre-Dame de Saint-Sever-Calvados), monks, Diocese of Coutances (Saint-Sever-Calvados, Calvados)
- Saint-Sever Abbey (Abbaye de Saint-Sever), monks, Diocese of Tarbes (Saint-Sever, Landes)
- Abbey of Saint-Sever-de-Rustan (Abbaye de Saint-Sever-de-Rustan), nuns (Saint-Sever-de-Rustan, Hautes-Pyrénées)
- Abbaye de Saint-Sulpice-la-Forêt, see Abbaye du Nid-de-Merle
- Abbey of St Symphorian, Autun (Abbaye Saint-Symphorien d'Autun), monks, Diocese of Autun (Autun, Saône-et-Loire)
- Abbey of St Symphorian, Beauvais (Abbaye Saint-Symphorien de Beauvais), monks, Diocese of Beauvais (Beauvais, Oise)
- Abbey of St Symphorian, Metz (Abbaye Saint-Symphorien de Metz), monks, Diocese of Metz (Metz, Moselle)
- Abbey of St Symphorian, Thiers (Abbaye Saint-Symphorien de Thiers), monks, Diocese of Clermont (Thiers, Puy-de-Dôme)
- Abbey of Saint-Théodard, Montauriol (Abbaye Saint-Théodard, Abbaye Saint-Théodard de Montauriol or en Quercy), Diocese of Montauban (Montauriol, Montauban, Tarn-et-Garonne)
- Saint-Thibéry Abbey (Abbaye de Saint-Thibéry), Diocese of Agde (Saint-Thibéry, Hérault)
- Saint-Thierry Abbey (Abbaye de Saint-Thierry; also Abbaye du Mont d'Hor or d'Or), monks from c.500 to 1695, nuns from 1968, (Saint-Thierry, Marne)
- Saint-Urbain Abbey (Abbaye de Saint-Urbain), monks, Diocese of Châlons-sur-Marne (Saint-Urbain-Maconcourt, Haute-Marne)
- Saint-Valery Abbey (Abbaye de Saint-Valery), monks, Diocese of Amiens (Saint-Valery-sur-Somme, Somme)
- Abbey of St Vanne or St Vannes (Abbaye de Saint-Vanne or Saint-Vannes), monks, Diocese of Verdun (Verdun, Meuse); seat of the Congregation of St. Vanne
- Abbey of St Victor, Marseille (Abbaye de Saint-Victor de Marseille), monks, Diocese of Marseille (Marseille, Bouches-du-Rhône)
- Abbey of St Victor, Paris (Abbaye de Saint-Victor de Paris), monks, Diocese of Paris (Quartier Saint-Victor, 5th arrondissement, Paris)
- Abbey of Saint-Victor-en-Caux (Abbaye de Saint-Victor-en-Caux), monks, Diocese of Rouen (Saint-Victor-l'Abbaye, Seine-Maritime)
- Abbey of Saint-Vincent-du-Luc otherwise Saudebonne Abbey (Abbaye de Saint-Vincent-du-Luc or de Saudebonne), Diocese of Oloron (Oloron-Sainte-Marie, Pyrénées-Atlantiques)
- Abbey of St Wandrille formerly Fontenelle Abbey (Abbaye de Saint-Wandrille, Abbaye de Fontenelle), monks (668-852, 966-1791, 1898-1901, 1931- ), Diocese of Rouen (Saint-Wandrille-Rançon, Seine-Maritime)
- Abbey of St Wulmer otherwise Samer Abbey (Abbaye Saint-Wulmer or Abbaye de Samer), monks, Diocese of Boulogne (Samer, Pas-de-Calais)
- Sainte-Austreberthe Abbey (Abbaye de Sainte-Austreberthe), nuns, Diocese of Amiens (Sainte-Austreberthe near Marconne, Pas-de-Calais)
- Sainte-Colombe Abbey (Abbaye Sainte-Colombe de Saint-Denis-lès-Sens), monks, Diocese of Sens (Saint-Denis-lès-Sens, Yonne)
- Saintes (Charente-Maritime):
  - Abbaye aux Dames, Saintes
  - Abbey of St Eutropius, Saintes (Abbaye Saint-Eutrope de Saintes)
- Salve Abbey, see Sauve Abbey
- Saramon Abbey (Abbaye Notre-Dame de Saramon), monks, Diocese of Auch (Saramon, Gers)
- Sarlat Abbey (Abbaye de Sarlat), monks (?-1318) (Sarlat-la-Canéda, Dordogne)
- Saudebonne Abbey, see Abbey of Saint-Vincent-du-Luc
- La Saussaye Abbey or Priory (Abbaye or Prieuré de la Saussaye), nuns, Diocese of Paris (La Saussaye-lès-Villejuif, Villejuif, Val-de-Marne)
- Sauve Abbey otherwise Salve Abbey (Abbaye de Sauve or Salve), monks, Diocese of Alès (Sauve, Gard)
- Sauve-Majeure Abbey, see Grande-Sauve Abbey
- Savigny Abbey (Abbaye de Savigny, Abbaye de la Sainte-Trinité de Savigny), monks, (Savigny-le-Vieux, Manche)
- Savigny Abbey (Abbaye de Savigny, Abbaye Saint-Martin de Savigny), monks, Diocese of Lyon (Savigny, Rhône)
- Abbey of St Martin, Sées (Abbaye Saint-Martin de Sées), monks, Diocese of Sées (Sées, Orne)
- Selz Abbey or Seltz Abbey (Abbaye de Selz or Seltz) (Seltz, Bas-Rhin)
- Sendras Abbey, see Cendras Abbey
- Senones Abbey (Abbaye Saint-Pierre de Senones), monks, Diocese of Saint-Dié (Senones, Vosges)
- Abbey of St John, Sens (Abbaye Saint-Jean de Sens), nuns, Diocese of Sens (Sens, Yonne)
- Seuilly Abbey otherwise Seuillé Abbey (Abbaye de Seuilly or Seuillé), monks, Diocese of Tours (Seuilly, Indre-et-Loire) (1100–1736)
- La Sie Abbey, also La Sye Abbey, otherwise Abbey of La Sie-en-Brignon (Abbaye Notre-Dame de la Sie-en-Brignon; otherwise Abbaye de la Sie or la Sye, Abbaye de Lassé, Abbaye de or du Brignon; Abbaye de l'Absie-en-Brignon), monks (Saint-Macaire-du-Bois, Maine-et-Loire)
- Simorre Abbey (Abbaye Notre-Dame de Simorre), monks, Diocese of Auch (Simorre, Gers)
- Soissons (Aisne), Diocese of Soissons:
  - Abbey of St Medard, Soissons (Abbaye Saint-Médard de Soissons), monks
  - Abbey of Our Lady, Soissons (Abbaye Notre-Dame de Soissons), nuns
- Solesmes (Sarthe), Diocese of Le Mans:
  - Solesmes Abbey (Abbaye Saint-Pierre de Solesmes), monks
  - Abbey of St Cecilia, Solesmes (Abbaye Sainte-Cécile de Solesmes), nuns
- Solignac Abbey (Abbaye Saint-Pierre de Solignac), monks, Diocese of Limoges (Solignac, Haute-Vienne)
- Sorde Abbey (Abbaye Saint-Jean de Sorde), monks, Diocese of Dax (Sorde-l'Abbaye, Landes)
- Sorèze Abbey (Abbaye de Sorèze), monks, Diocese of Lavaur (Sorèze, Tarn)
- Souillac Abbey (Abbaye Sainte-Marie de Souillac), monks, Diocese of Cahors (Souillac, Lot)
- Sourribes Abbey (Abbaye de Sourribes), nuns, Diocese of Gap (Sourribes, Alpes-de-Haute-Provence)
- Soyons Abbey (Abbaye Notre-Dame de Soyons), nuns, Diocese of Valence (Valence, Drôme; founded at Soyons, Ardèche, and transferred to Valence in 1632)
- La Sye Abbey, see La Sie Abbey

== T ==
- Talloires Abbey (Abbaye de Talloires) (1675-?), Diocese of Geneva (Talloires, Haute-Savoie)
- Tarascon Abbey (Abbaye Notre-Dame et Saint-Honorat de Tarascon), nuns, Diocese of Avignon (1358-1790) (Tarascon, Bouches-du-Rhône)
- Tasque Abbey (Abbaye de Tasque), monks, Diocese of Tarbes (Tasque, Gers)
- Temple, see Saint-Louis-du-Temple
- Terrasson Abbey (Abbaye de Terrasson), monks, Diocese of Sarlat (11th-15th centuries) (Terrasson-Lavilledieu, Dordogne)
- Thérouanne Abbey, see Abbey of Saint-Bertin
- Thiers Abbey or Moûtier Abbey (Abbaye Saint-Symphorien de Thiers, otherwise Abbaye du Moûtier), monks, Diocese of Clermont (Thiers, Puy-de-Dôme)
- Tiron Abbey (Abbaye de la Sainte-Trinité de Tiron), monks, Diocese of Chartres (Thiron-Gardais, Eure-et-Loir)
- Tonnay-Charente Abbey (Abbaye de Tonnay-Charente), monks, Diocese of Saintes (Tonnay-Charente, Charente-Maritime)
- Tonnerre Abbey (Abbaye Saint-Michel de Tonnerre), monks, Diocese of Langres (Tonnerre, Yonne)
- Torcy Abbey (Abbaye de Torcy), nuns (founded 1657), Diocese of Paris (Torcy, Seine-et-Marne)
- Toul (Meurthe-et-Moselle), Diocese of Toul:
  - Abbey of St. Evre, Toul (Abbaye de Saint-Evre or Saint-Epvre), monks
  - Abbey of St Mansuy, Toul (Abbaye de Saint-Mansuy), monks
- Abbey of St. Sernin, Toulouse (Abbaye Saint-Sernin de Toulouse or Basilique Saint-Sernin de Toulouse), monks, Diocese of Toulouse (Toulouse, Haute-Garonne)
- Tournay Abbey (Abbaye Notre-Dame de Tournay), monks (Tournay, Hautes-Pyrénées)
- Tournus Abbey or Abbey of St Philibert, Tournus (Abbaye Saint-Philibert de Tournus), monks, Diocese of Chalon-sur-Saône (Tournus, Saône-et-Loire)
- Abbey of St Julian, Tours (Abbaye Saint-Julien de Tours), monks, Diocese of Tours (Tours, Indre-et-Loire)
- Tourtoirac Abbey (Abbaye de Tourtoirac), monks, Diocese of Périgueux (Tourtoirac, Dordogne)
- Traisnel Abbey or Tresnel Abbey (Abbaye Sainte-Madeleine de Traisnel or Tresnel), nuns, Diocese of Paris (Rue de Charonne, 11th arrondissement, Paris)
- Le Tréport Abbey (Abbaye Saint-Michel du Tréport), monks, Diocese of Rouen (Le Tréport, Seine-Maritime)
- Triors Abbey (Abbaye Notre-Dame de Triors), monks (1994-) (Châtillon-Saint-Jean, Drôme)
- Troarn Abbey (Abbaye Saint-Martin de Troarn), monks, Diocese of Bayeux (Troarn, Calvados)
- Le Tronchet Abbey (Abbaye du Tronchet), monks, Diocese of Dol (1170-?) (Le Tronchet, Ille-et-Vilaine)
- Turpenay Abbey (Abbaye de Turpenay), monks, Diocese of Tours (Saint-Benoît-la-Forêt, Indre-et-Loire)

== U ==
- Abbey of St Scholastica, Urt (Abbaye de Saint-Scholastique d'Urt), nuns (Urt, Pyrénées-Atlantiques)
- Uzerche Abbey (Abbaye Saint-Pierre d'Uzerche), monks, Diocese of Limoges (Uzerche, Corrèze)

== V ==
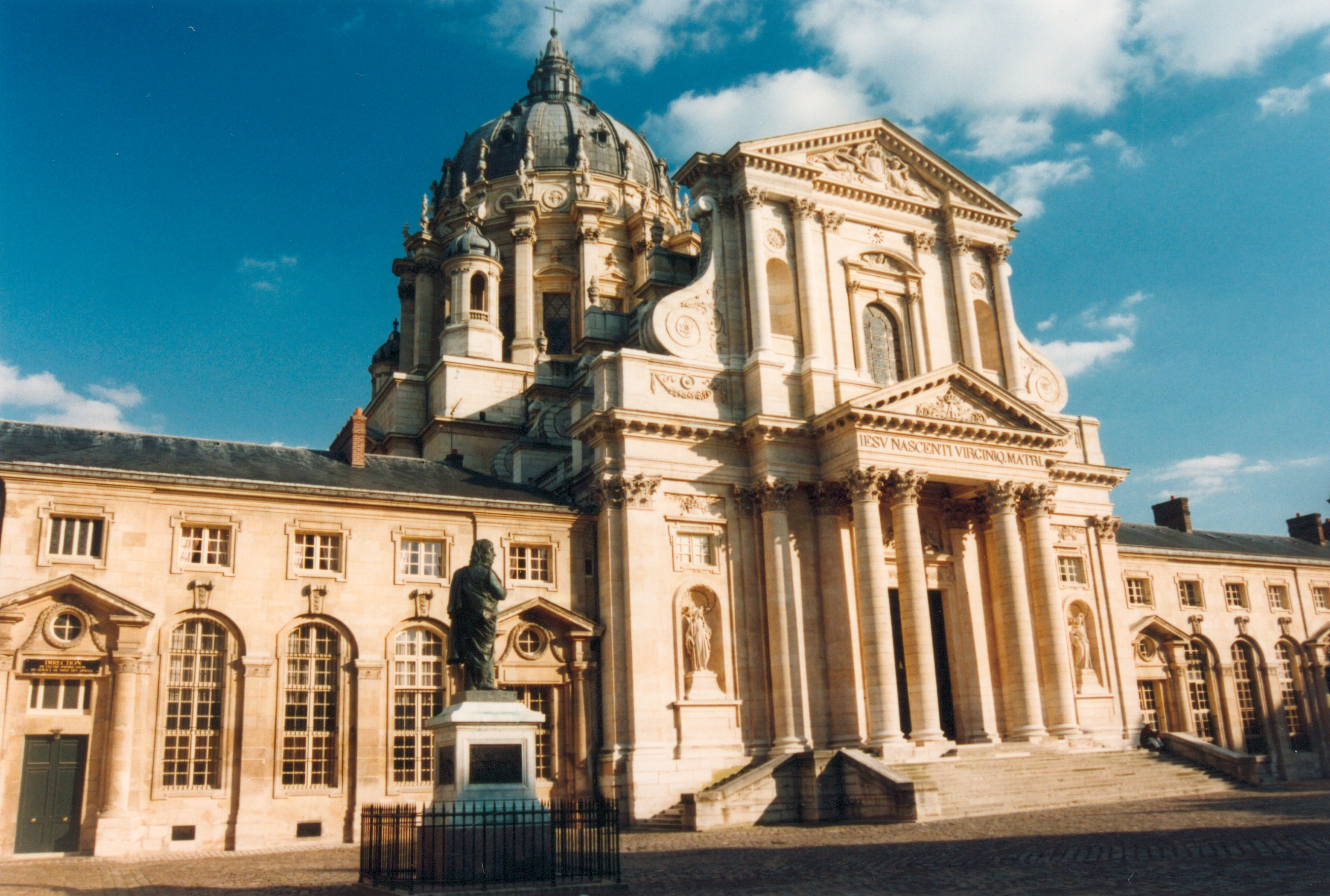
Val-de-Grâce Abbey (Paris)

- Vabres Abbey (Abbaye de Vabres), Diocese of Rodez, later Diocese of Vabres (Vabres-l'Abbaye, Aveyron)
- Val-de-Grâce Abbey (Abbaye royale Notre-Dame du Val-de-Grâce), nuns, Diocese of Paris (1621–1790; this was the community of Val-de-Grâce Priory, Bièvres, which was moved to Paris and elevated to an abbey by Anne of Austria) (5th arrondissement, Paris)
- Val-de-Grâce Priory (Prieuré du Val-de-Grâce, formerly du Val Profond), nuns (12th century–1621; community transferred to Paris to form Val-de-Grâce Abbey) (Bièvres, Essonne)
- Le Valdieu Abbey (Abbaye du Valdieu), Diocese of Besançon
- Valdosne Abbey (Abbaye de Valdosne-près-Charenton), nuns, Diocese of Paris (Saint-Maurice, Val-de-Marne)
- Valenciennes Abbey (Abbaye Saint-Sauve de Valenciennes), monks, Diocese of Cambrai (Valenciennes, Nord)
- Valmagne Abbey (Abbaye de Valmagne), monks (Benedictine 1138-1158; Cistercian 1158-1790) (Villeveyrac, Hérault)
- Valmont Abbey (Abbaye de Valmont, Abbaye Notre-Dame-du-Pré de Valmont), monks (1169-?), later nuns (1994-) Diocese of Rouen (Valmont, Seine-Maritime)
- Valognes Abbey (Abbaye Notre-Dame de Protection de Valognes), nuns (1636–1791 and 1810-) (Valognes, Manche)
- Val-Profond, see Val-de-Grâce
- Vauhallan, see Saint-Louis-du-Temple
- Vaux Abbey (Abbaye Saint-Étienne de Vaux), monks, Diocese of Saintes (Vaux-sur-Mer, Charente-Maritime)
- Trinity Abbey, Vendôme (Abbaye de la Trinité de Vendôme), monks, Diocese of Blois (Vendôme, Loir-et-Cher)
- Venière Abbey (Abbaye Notre-Dame de Venière), nuns (1971-) (Boyer, Saône-et-Loire)
- Verdun Abbey (Abbaye Saint-Maur de Verdun), nuns, Diocese of Verdun (Verdun, Meuse)
- Vergaville Abbey (Abbaye Saint-Eustase de Vergaville), nuns, Diocese of Metz (Vergaville, Moselle)
- Verneuil Abbey (Abbaye Saint-Nicolas de Verneuil), nuns, Diocese of Évreux (1631-2001) (Verneuil-sur-Avre, Eure)
- Vertus Abbey (Abbaye Saint-Sauveur de Vertus), Diocese of Châlons-sur-Marne (Vertus, Marne)
- Verzi Abbey (Abbaye Saint-Basle de Verzi), monks, Diocese of Reims (Verzy, Marne)
- Vézelay Abbey (Abbaye de Vézelay), monks, Diocese of Autun (Vézelay, Yonne)
- Vienne (Isère):
  - Abbey of St Andrew, Vienne (Abbaye Saint-André-le-Bas de Vienne) (?-1765)
  - Abbey of St Marcel, Vienne (Abbaye Saint-Marcel de Vienne)
- Vierzon Abbey (Abbaye Saint-Pierre de Vierzon), monks, Diocese of Bourges (Vierzon, Cher)
- Vigeois Abbey (Abbaye Saint-Pierre du Vigeois), monks, Diocese of Limoges (Vigeois, Corrèze)
- Vignatz Abbey otherwise Vignats Abbey (Abbaye de Vignatz or Vignats), nuns, Diocese of Séez (Vignats, Calvados)
- Villedieu Abbey (Abbaye de Villedieu), nuns, Diocese of Viviers
- Villeloin Abbey (Abbaye Saint-Sauveur de Villeloin), monks, Diocese of Tours (Villeloin-Coulangé, Indre-et-Loire)
- Villemagne Abbey (Abbaye de Villemagne), monks, Diocese of Béziers (Villemagne-l'Argentière, Hérault)
- Vielmur Abbey, otherwise Villemur or Vieil-Mur Abbey (Abbaye de Vielmur, Villemur or Vieil-Mur; also Abbaye Notre-Dame de la Sagne), nuns, Diocese of Castres (Vielmur-sur-Agout, Tarn)
- Villeneuve Abbey (Abbaye Saint-André de Villeneuve-lès-Avignon), monks, Diocese of Avignon (Villeneuve-lès-Avignon, Gard)
- Vosne Abbey (Abbaye Saint-Vivant de Vosne-Romanée) (?-1753) (Vosne-Romanée, Côte-d'Or)

== W ==
- Wisques, Pas-de-Calais:
  - Abbey of Our Lady, Wisques (Abbaye Notre-Dame de Wisques), nuns
  - Abbey of St Paul, Wisques (Abbaye Saint-Paul de Wisques), monks (1910-)

== Y ==
- Yerres Abbey (Abbaye Notre-Dame d'Yerres), nuns, Diocese of Paris (?-1791) (Yerres, Essonne)
- Yzeure Priory otherwise Yzeure Abbey (Abbaye d'Yzeure, Prieuré Saint-Pierre d'Yzeure), nuns (a Benedictine abbey until c 1151, when it became a priory of Saint-Menoux Abbey) (Yzeure, Allier)

== See also ==
- List of Christian monasteries in France
- List of Augustinian monasteries in France
- List of Carthusian monasteries § France
- List of Cistercian monasteries in France
- List of Premonstratensian monasteries in France
