= Immaculate Heart of Mary Abbey =

Benedictine monastery in Westfield, Vermont

- Location within Vermont

Monastery information
- Order: Benedictine
- Denomination: Roman Catholic Church
- Established: 1981
- Mother house: Abbaye Sainte-Marie des Deux-Montagnes
- Dedication: St. Scholastica
- Archdiocese: Boston
- Diocese: Burlington

People
- Abbess: Benedict McLaughlin

Architecture
- Functional status: abbey

Site
- Location: 4103 Route 100, Westfield, Vermont; 05874
- Coordinates: 44.8455428°N 72.431759°W
- Website: www.ihmwestfield.com

The Immaculate Heart of Mary Abbey is a Benedictine abbey located in Westfield, Vermont.

== History ==
It was founded in 1981 as the Monastery of the Immaculate Heart of Mary by nuns from the Abbaye Sainte-Marie des Deux-Montagnes in Sainte-Marthe-sur-le-Lac, Quebec. It is part of the Solesmes Congregation, and traces its origins to St. Cecilia's Abbey, and the 11th Century Abbaye Saint-Pierre de Solesmes in France. The only other monastery of the Solesmes Congregation in the United States is Clear Creek Abbey in Cherokee County, Oklahoma.

On September 21, 2023, Mother Benedict McLaughlin was elected as the Immaculate Heart of Mary's first abbess. On November 11, 2023, Dom Geoffroy Kemlin, abbot president of the Solesmes Congregation, gave it the abbatial blessing to Mother Benedict McLaughlin. It is subsequently known as the Immaculate Heart of Mary Abbey.

The congregation of the monastery uses Latin Gregorian chant during services, part of the spiritual heritage of Cécile Bruyère and Prosper Guéranger. Martha Hennessy, a noted peace activist and member of the Catholic Worker Movement, was an oblate at the monastery.

The monastery has a guesthouse outside of the monastic enclosure, where women who wish to take part in the quiet and solitude of monastic life can stay. Guests are given three meals a day, prepared by the sisters. There is a small gift shop on the monastery property which sells religious goods such as rosaries made by the nuns, books, CDs, medals and crucifixes.

=== Baking of altar bread ===
The nuns produce and sell altar bread for consecration during Mass. Proceeds from the sale of altar bread are used to help support the monastery. The monastery began producing altar bread in 1990, after the Daughters of the Sacred Heart of Jesus discontinued baking altar breads, giving their equipment to the monastery. The monastery upgraded their baking equipment a few years later, buying five new bakers.

In 2017, the monastery shipped over 3.7 million hosts to parishes throughout the United States and Canada, with the majority going to parishes in the Roman Catholic Diocese of Burlington and Archdiocese of Boston.

The batter for the altar bread is made out of flour and water, and baked on a stove. Different types of altar bread call for different mixtures of flours, such as whole-wheat flour and cake flour, to achieve different textures and colours.

Altar breads are sorted and inspected prior to shipping. Approximately 5,500 out of every 6,000 breads are suitable for the Eucharist. Some of the imperfect hosts and cuttings from the baking process are sold as "Monastery Manna" in the monastery's gift shop, while others are sold to farmers as animal feed.
