= Solesmes =

Solesmes may refer to the following places in France:

- Solesmes, Nord, a commune in the Nord department
- Solesmes, Sarthe, a commune in the Sarthe department
- Solesmes Abbey, also known as St. Peter's Abbey, in the Sarthe department
- Solesmes Congregation, an association of monasteries within the Benedictine Confederation
