= Clervaux Abbey =

Benedictine monastery in Luxembourg

- Abbaye de Clervaux
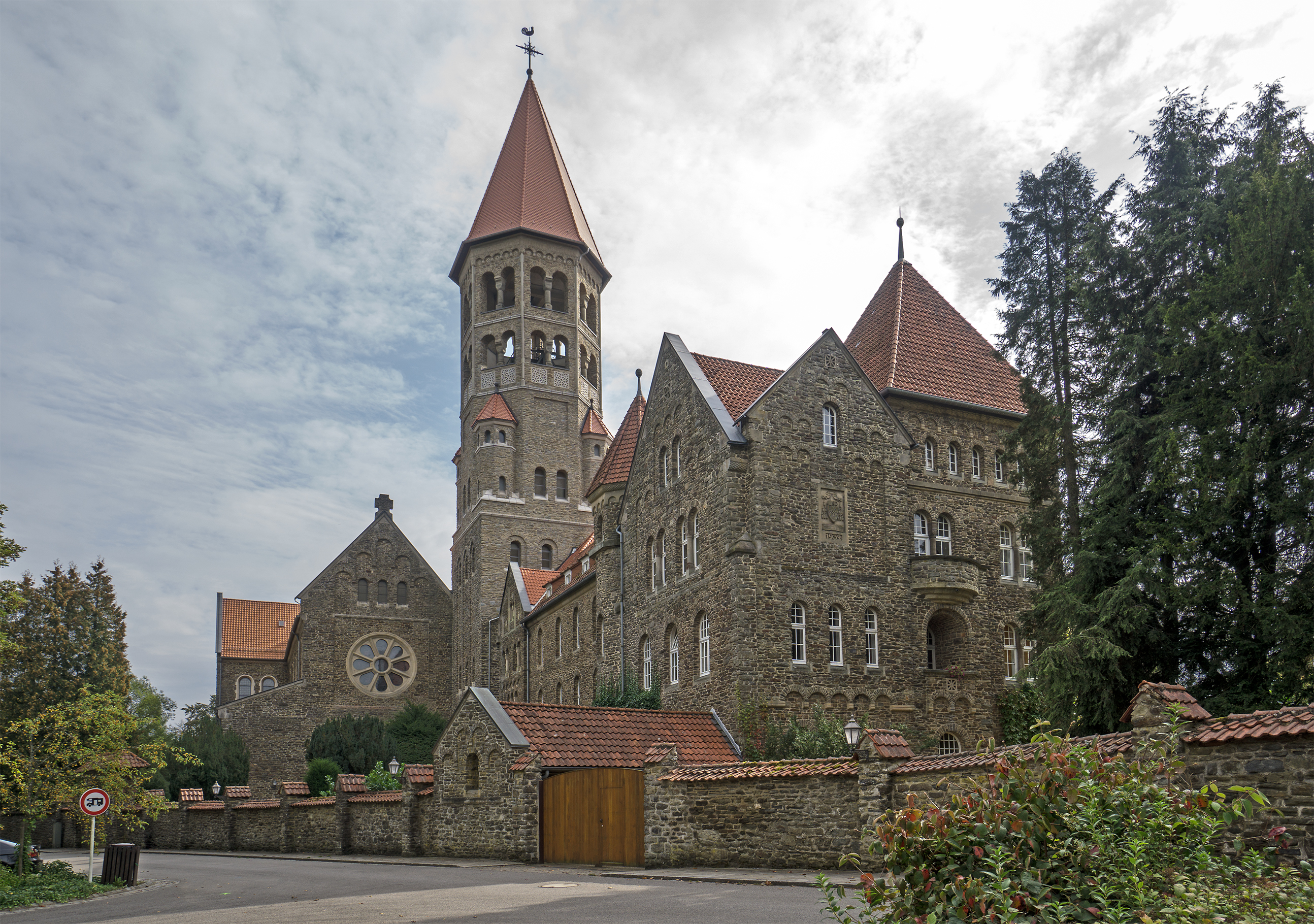
- Clervaux Abbey

- Location within Luxembourg

Monastery information
- Full name: Abbaye Saint-Maurice et Saint-Maur de Clervaux
- Order: Benedictine
- Established: 1908
- Mother house: Solesmes Abbey
- Dedication: Saint Maurice & Saint Maurus
- Diocese: Luxembourg

People
- Founders: Dom Louis-Charles Couturier, O.S.B.
- Abbot: Dom Michel Jorrot, O.S.B.
- Important associated figures: Dom Jean Leclercq, O.S.B.

Architecture
- Functional status: active
- Architect: J.F. Klomp
- Style: Neo-Romanesque
- Groundbreaking: 1909

Site
- Coordinates: 50.0544°N 6.0293°E
- Website: www.abbaye-clervaux.lu/fr/accueil/

The Abbey of St. Maurice and St. Maurus of Clervaux (Luxembourgish: Benediktinerabtei hellege Moritz) (French: Abbaye Saint-Maurice et Saint-Maur de Clervaux), founded in 1890, is a Benedictine monastery in Clervaux, Luxembourg. It is a member of the Solesmes Congregation in the Benedictine Confederation.

== History ==
The abbey was founded by the Benedictine monks of the Abbey of St. Maur of Glanfeuil in France, itself founded in the 7th century. After its suppression under the French Revolution, that abbey remained vacant until it was re-established in 1890 under Louis-Charles Couturier, O.S.B., Abbot of Solesmes Abbey. In 1901, however, the monks were compelled to leave France due to the anti-clerical laws of the Third French Republic. After finding refuge in Baronville, Belgium (now part of the municipality of Beauraing), the monks began to search for a permanent home. After various inquiries failed, they finally settled upon Clervaux. In 1908, a vote was taken by the monastic chapter, which made the decision to dissolve the existing monastery, and to found a new monastery there, dedicated to St. Maurice. Construction on the new abbey, designed in the Neo-Romanesque style by Johann Franz Klomp (1865-1946), a Dutch architect based in Germany, was begun in 1909 (the local parish church in Clervaux was also being built to Klomp’s design around the same time). The monks arrived in August 1910 to begin living at the new site. In 1926, the name of St. Maur was added to that of St. Maurice.

In 1937, the Holy See established the monastery as a territorial abbey, independent of the authority of the local bishop. This status lasted until 1946. For much of this period, however, the monastic community of Clervaux lived in exile, having been expelled in January 1941 from the abbey by the Gestapo, as part of their occupation of the nation. The monks were not able to re-occupy their monastery until 1945.

The Benedictine monks who live here at present come from various countries. They divide their time between personal and communal prayer and work. The main emphasis lies on the communal chorus prayers, consisting of psalms and hymns, known as the Liturgy of the Hours and on the celebration of the Eucharist.

The monks also help with spiritual activities outside the monastery when needed for religious retreats, substitution for clergy in the parishes of the diocese, pastoral care or dispensing of the sacraments. Some of the monks excel in intellectual and artistic activities. They also do manual work according to the needs of the monastery and charity institutions.

As part of a monastic congregation which helped in the revival of Gregorian chant in the 19th century, St. Maurice Abbey has produced several notable recordings of this music performed by the monks of the abbey.

Prince Charles of Luxembourg, the current heir apparent to the Luxembourgish throne, as the elder child and son of Grand Duke Guillaume V and Grand Duchess Stéphanie (by birth a member of the House of Lannoy, a branch of which holds the title of Counts of Clervaux), was baptised at Clervaux Abbey on 19 September 2020.

== Notable connections ==
The noted Icelandic writer, Halldór Laxness (1902–1998), converted to Roman Catholicism while staying at the abbey. The monastic community has supported a Catholic mission to Scandinavia for many years.

A monk of the abbey, Dom Jean Leclercq, O.S.B., was a noted patristics scholar and helped to guide the renewal of Catholic monastic life during the second half of the 20th century.

Another monk of the abbey, Dom Paul Benoit, was a composer of mainly liturgical organ music.

Australian-based Luxembourg composer Georges Lentz wrote his one-hour solo electric guitar piece “Ingwe” during a stay at the abbey.
