= St Cecilia's Abbey =

St or St. Cecilia's Abbey may refer to:

- St Cecilia's Abbey, Ryde, abbey of Benedictine nuns on the Isle of Wight, England

- Appley House, the house occupied by the abbey

- St. Cecilia's Abbey, Solesmes, abbey of Benedictine nuns in France
