= Louis-Charles Couturier =

French Benedictine monk

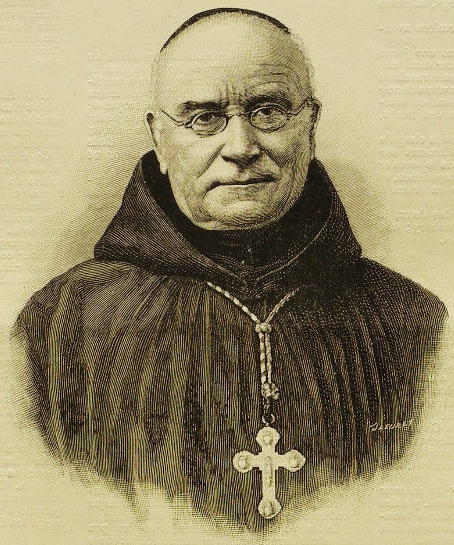
Louis-Charles Couturier

Coat of arms of Couturier

Louis-Charles Couturier (12 May 1817 – 29 October 1890) was a French Benedictine monk, Abbot of the Abbey of Saint-Pierre at Solesmes and President of the French Congregation (now Solesmes Congregation) of the Order of St. Benedict.

== Life ==
Couturier was born in the town of Chemillé-sur-Dême, Indre-et-Loire, on 12 May 1817. As a young boy he felt called to serve as a Catholic priest and was educated at the minor seminary of Combrée in Anjou and at the major seminary of Angers, after which he was ordained a priest on 12 March 1842. After teaching history at Combrée from 1836 to 1854, he entered the Benedictine Monastery of Saint-Pierre at Solesmes, then newly restored by Prosper Guéranger.

Guéranger appointed Couturier Master of novices one month after his religious profession in 1855, and towards the end of 1861 appointed him prior of the monastery. On the death of Guéranger, Couturier was unanimously elected to succeed him as abbot (11 February 1875). Pope Pius IX appointed him consultor of the Sacred Congregation of the Index, and granted him and his successors the privilege of wearing the cappa magna.

Couturier and his monks were forcibly expelled from their monastery by the government, on 6 November 1880, under the anti-clerical laws of the French Third Republic. Later, having attempted to reoccupy it, they were driven out a second time on 29 March 1882. During the remainder of Couturier's life the community lived in three separate houses in the town of Solesmes, using the parish church of the town as their abbey church.

Couturier encouraged writers among his monks, and restored old and deserted monasteries, as well as fostering the foundations made by Guéranger. On 28 March 1876, he raised the Priory of St. Mary Magdalene at Marseille to the dignity of an abbey; in 1880 he restored and repeopled the Abbey of Santo Domingo de Silos in Spain; in July, 1889, he established the Priory of Saint-Paul at Wisques, in the Diocese of Arras; and on 15 September 1890, shortly before his death, he reopened the ancient Abbey of Glanfeuil in the Diocese of Angers, deserted since the French Revolution. He died on 29 October 1890 in Solesmes.

== Works ==
Couturier's literary labours were chiefly his collaboration in the publication of Les Actes des martyrs, a French translation of the Acts of the Martyrs from the beginning of the Christian era to ourmodern times. The third edition of the work appeared in four volumes (Paris, 1900).
