= Abbey of St. Mary, Paris =

Abbey in Paris, France

Coordinates: 48.8513°N 2.2688°E

Abbey of St Mary, Paris
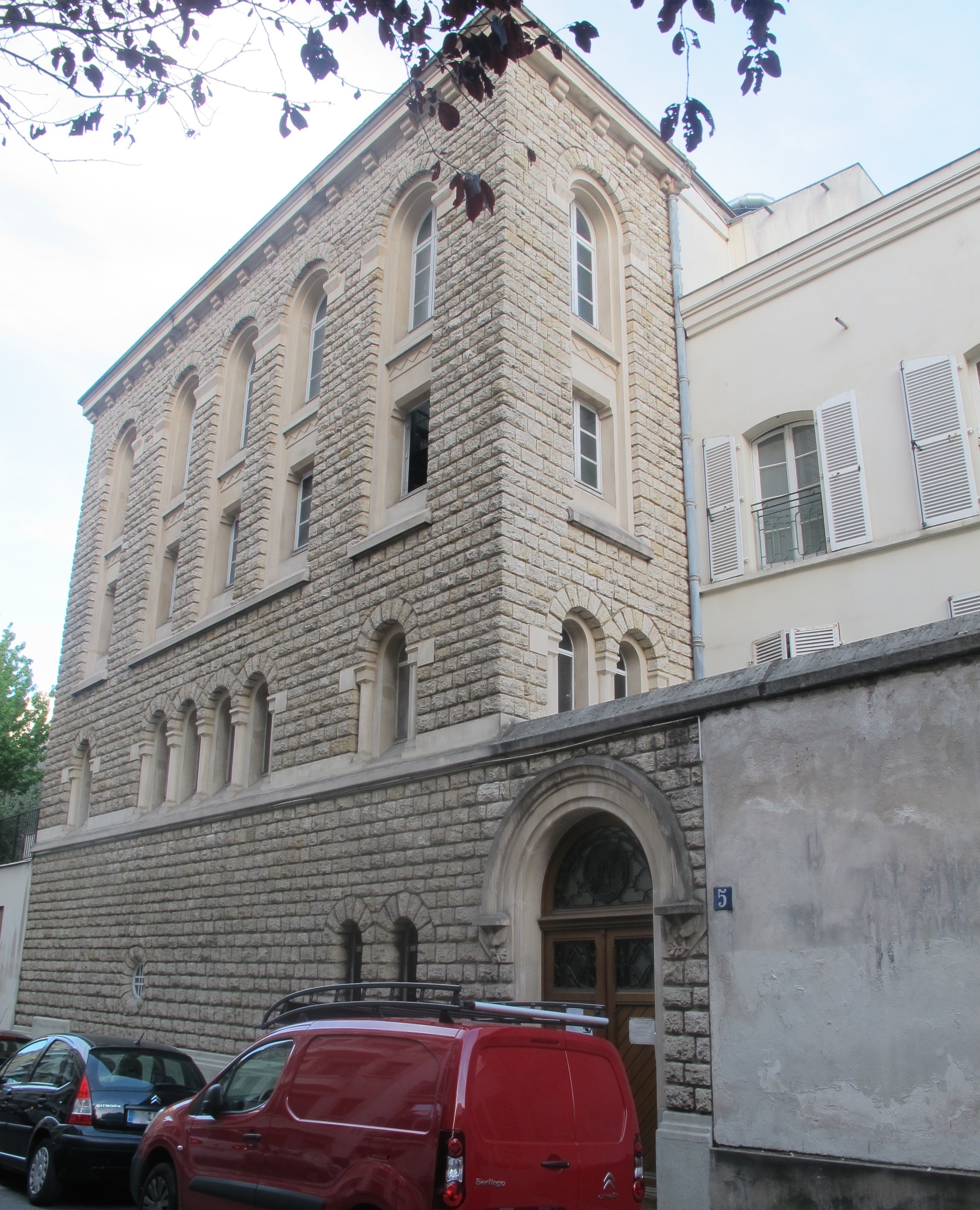
- Interactive map of Abbey of St Mary, Paris

Monastery information
- Order: Benedictine
- Established: 1893
- Disestablished: 2021
- Dedication: Our Blessed Lady
- Diocese: Archdiocese of Paris

The Abbey of St Mary, Paris, otherwise the Abbaye de la Source (French: Abbaye Sainte-Marie de Paris, Abbaye de la Source), was a Benedictine monastery within the Solesmes Congregation, based at 3/5 Rue de la Source in the 16th arrondissement of Paris. It was founded in 1893 from Ligugé Abbey as a priory, before being elevated to the status of an abbey in 1925. In 2021 it closed for lack of vocations and the premises were partly leased to the Emmanuel Community, becoming an "international house for the formation of their seminarians".
