= Mary Totah =

American nun (1957-2017)

Mary Totah

Mary David Totah OSB, known as Sister Mary David, born Michelle Frieda Totah, (26 March 1957 - 28 August 2017) was an American nun who became prioress of St Cecilia's Abbey on the Isle of Wight, England.

== Early life ==
Totah was born in Philadelphia to Catholic Arab parents from Ramallah, Palestine. She grew up in Louisiana and attended Holy Savior Menard Central High School. where she was the first female student president. She studied English literature at Loyola University New Orleans and obtained an M.A. at the University of Virginia, and in 1980 she became one of the first women to study at Christ Church, Oxford, where she obtained a D.Phil. (1985) from University of Oxford, her thesis title being Consciousness versus authority : a study of the critical debate between the Bloomsbury Group and the Men of 1914, 1910-1930. (The term "Men of 1914" was used by Wyndham Lewis to refer to himself T. S. Eliot, Ezra Pound and James Joyce.) She began an academic career with a tenure-track appointment in the English Department at the College of William & Mary, Virginia, United States.

== Religious calling ==
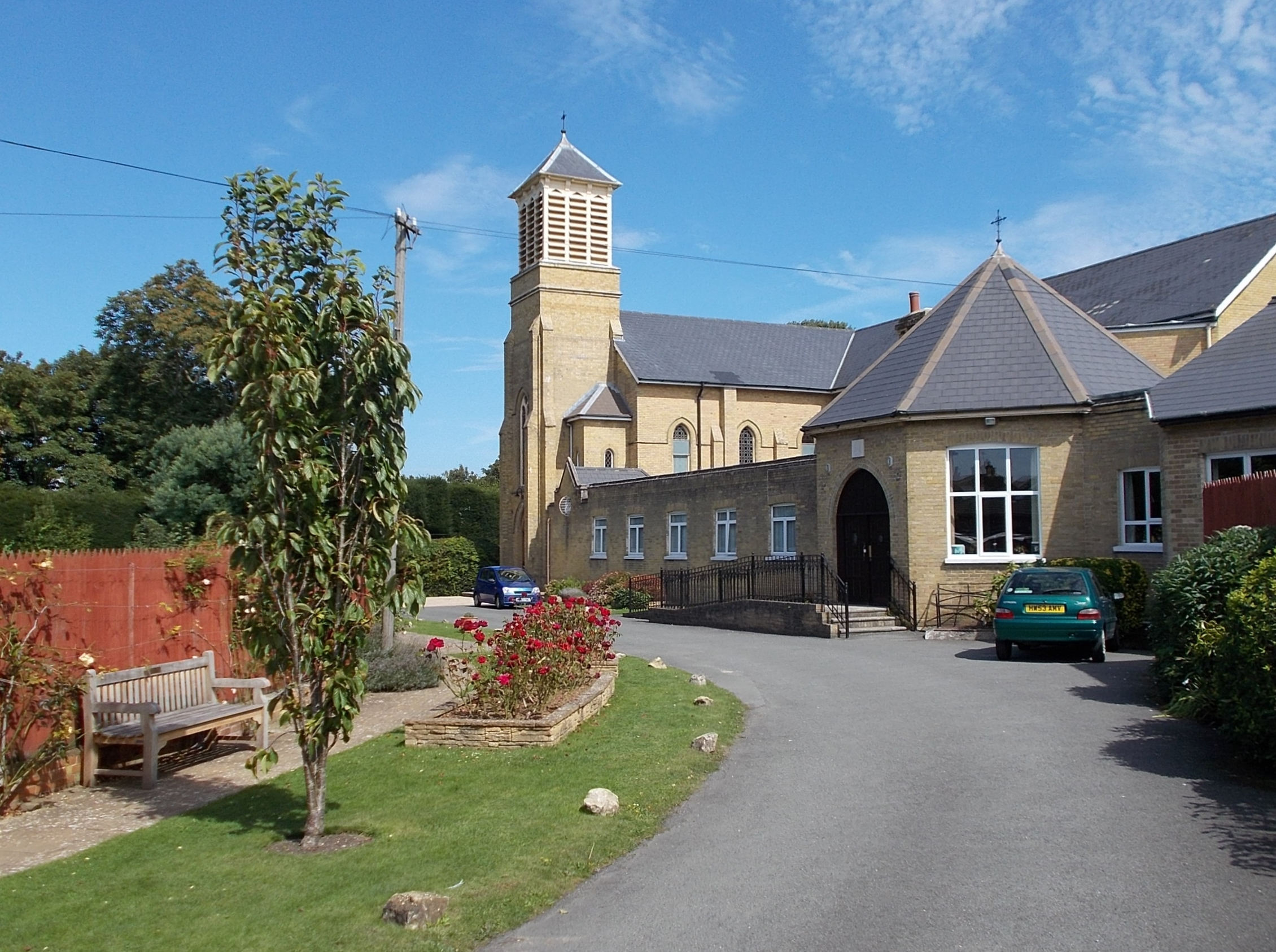
St Cecilia's Abbey, where Sister Mary David was prioress

After having spent some time in retreat at the Benedictine St Cecilia's Abbey at Ryde on the Isle of Wight when she had completed her doctoral research, she decided to leave William and Mary and join the enclosed community there. She was its novice mistress for 22 years and the prioress for eight years.

In 1996 she published an edition of the writings of Prosper Guéranger, Cécile Bruyère and Paul Delatte, from St. Cecilia's Abbey, Solesmes, entitled The Spirit of Solesmes. She also published works on prayer, fasting, the consecrated life, and confirmation, and a collection of her writing was published posthumously in 2020 under the title The Joy of God.

== Death and legacy ==
Sister Mary David died on 28 August 2017 after suffering from bowel cancer for five years.

In 2020, Bloomsbury published her collected writings as The Joy of God.

== Selected publications ==
- The Spirit of Solesmes: Dom Prosper Guéranger (1805-1875), Abbess Cécile Bruyère (1845-1909), Dom Paul Delatte (1848-1937), selected, edited and introduced by Mary David Totah (1996, Burns & Oates: ISBN 0860122697) (2nd edition published 2016)
- Deepening Prayer: Life defined by prayer (2006, Catholic Truth Society: ISBN 1860823823)
- Christian Fasting: Disciplining the body, awakening the spirit (2012, Catholic Truth Society: ISBN 9781860827723)
- A Divine Gift: The consecrated life (2014, Catholic Truth Society: ISBN 9781784690083)
- Confirmation: The spirit of Christ (2017, Catholic Truth Society: ISBN 9781784694104)
- The Joy of God: Collected writings. Bloomsbury, London, 2020. ISBN 9781472971326
