= St Cecilia's Abbey, Ryde =

Benedictine abbey on Isle of Wight, England

Coordinates: 50.7285°N 1.1463°W

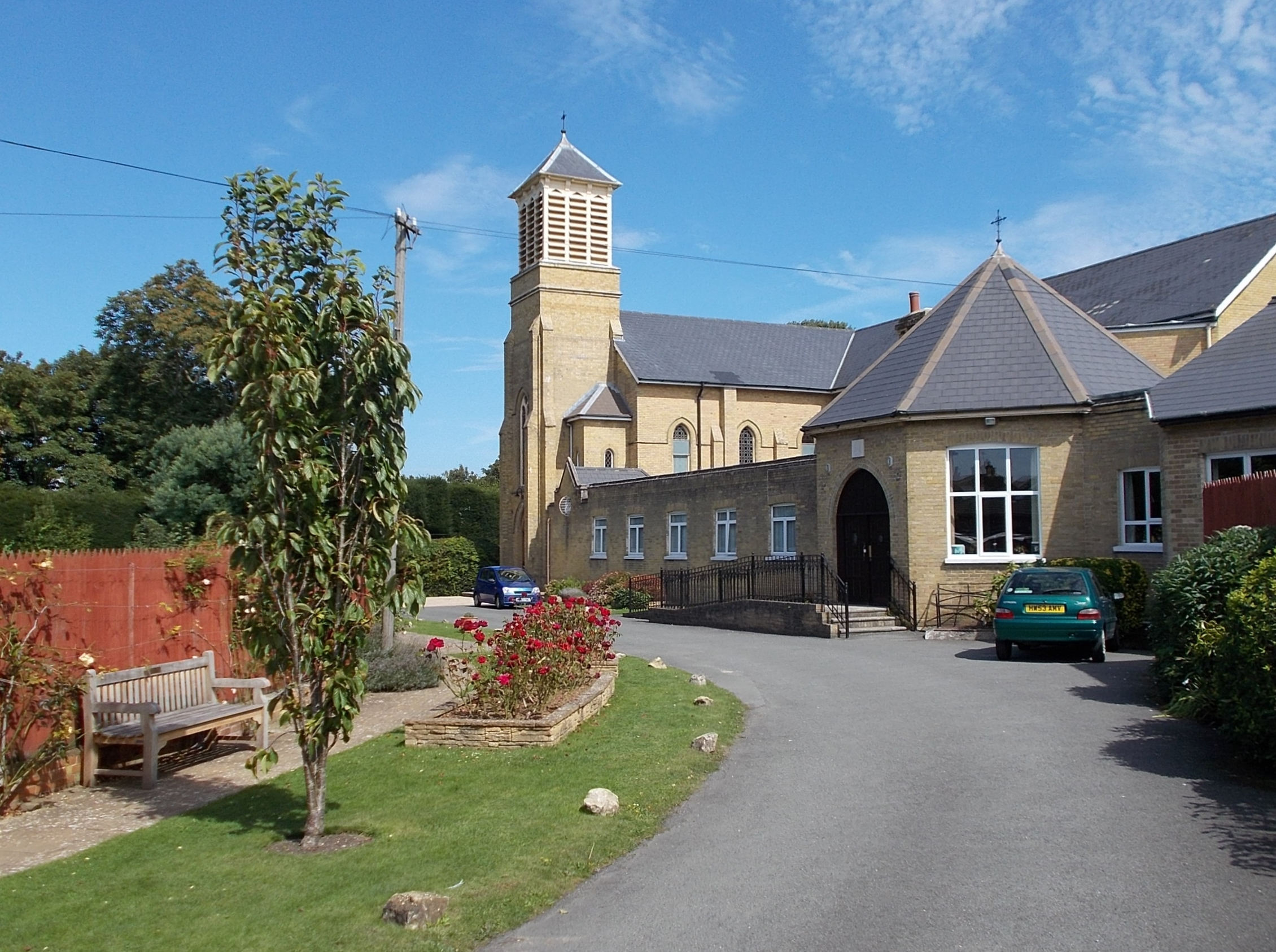
- St Cecilia's Abbey in 2017

Monastery information
- Order: Benedictine Order
- Established: 1882
- Dedicated to: Peace of the Heart of Jesus
- Diocese: Roman Catholic Diocese of Portsmouth

People
- Important associated figures: Florence de Werquignoeul; Dom Prosper Guéranger; Cécile Bruyère; Sister Mary David

Architecture
- Architect: Edward Goldie

Site
- Location: Ryde

St Cecilia's Abbey, Ryde is an abbey of Benedictine nuns in the Isle of Wight, England.

== Monastic life ==
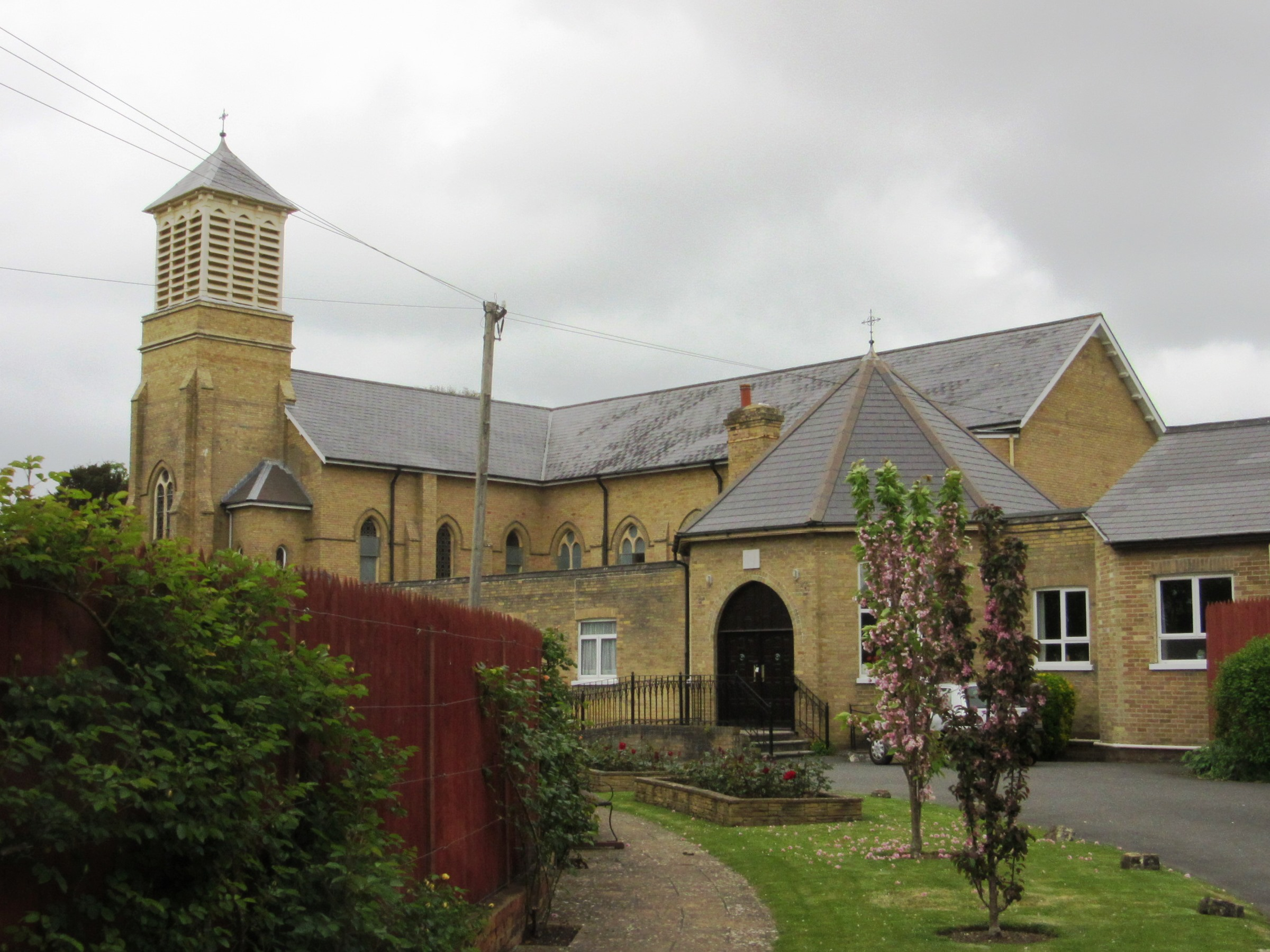
St Cecilia's Abbey in 2016

Founded in 1882 and dedicated to the Peace of the Heart of Jesus, St Cecilia's Abbey, Ryde, Isle of Wight, belongs to the Benedictine Order, and in particular to the Solesmes Congregation of Dom Prosper Guéranger. The nuns live a traditional monastic life of prayer, work and study in accordance with the ancient Rule of Saint Benedict.

As one of the institutes devoted 'entirely to divine worship in the contemplative life' (Vatican II, Perfectae Caritatis, 9) and following the tradition of Solesmes, St Cecilia's Abbey lays principal emphasis on the solemn celebration of the liturgy, with Mass and the Divine Office sung daily in Gregorian chant. The Second Vatican Council recognised the contemplative life as belonging 'to the fulness of the Church's presence' (Ad Gentes 18) and noted that such communities 'will always have a distinguished part to play in Christ's Mystical Body' (Perfectae Caritatis, 7). As Lumen Gentium (4) expressed it, 'For even though in some instances religious do not directly mingle with their contemporaries, yet in a more profound sense these same religious are united with them in the heart of Christ and co-operate with them spiritually.'

The Community supports itself mainly through its production of altar breads, as well as in intellectual and artistic work (calligraphy, candles, etc.). Other manual work includes garden, orchard, and beekeeping.

== History ==
The community's history has two sources: the seventeenth-century Belgian reform of Florence de Werquignoeul, and the restoration of the monastic order at Solesmes in France by Dom Prosper Guéranger in the nineteenth century.

=== Florence de Werquignoeul ===
With other great abbesses of that period, she helped to revive the order which was suffering from destruction without and from compromise within. In 1604 Florence and four companions left the Cistercian house at Flînes for the purpose of observing the Rule in its entirety. She established the monastery of Paix Notre Dame at Douai in 1604. Foundations followed, and in 1627 another Paix Notre Dame grew up at Liège. In 1882 this house made a foundation at Ventnor on the Isle of Wight, dedicated to the Peace of the Sacred Heart, Pax Cordis Jesu. This is the origin of the present Community. At the request of the Bishop, it opened a small school for girls which flourished for some years but was given up in 1922 when the expanding community moved to the site at Appley Ryde, vacated by the return to France of the exiled nuns of the Abbey of Ste-Cécile de Solesmes. In 1926, the Priory of Pax Cordis Jesu became an abbey.

=== Dom Prosper Guéranger ===
Dom Guéranger revived the Benedictine Order in France in 1833 where it had ceased to exist for forty-three years. He bought the Priory at Solesmes, which subsequently was raised to the rank of Abbey by Pope Gregory XVI. In his last years, he oversaw, in collaboration with the first abbess, Mother Cécile Bruyère, the establishment of a community of women under the Rule of St Benedict at the abbey of Ste-Cécile de Solesmes.

Neither he nor Florence de Werquignoeul desired to create a new form of religious life but to return to an ancient but living tradition. For both, the return to Benedictine tradition could be accomplished only by the adoption and observance of the Rule: 'It is by the Rule of St Benedict that we will be Benedictines,' wrote Dom Guéranger. For Florence, too, the Rule was the foundation of her reform, 'the daily bread which had nourished in the past the fervour of all the saints in the rigour of monastic observance.'

=== French anti-clerical laws ===
Because of the anti-clerical laws of 1901, the nuns of the Abbey of Ste-Cécile de Solesmes had been obliged to leave France. They found a temporary home at Northwood House, a country house in Cowes on the Isle of Wight loaned to them by Mr Edmund Ward (son of William George Ward, one of the prominent figures of the Oxford Movement and a friend of Cardinal Newman). When it became clear that there would be no speedy end to the exile, the French nuns had to think of a more permanent home. They bought Appley House near Ryde. The Solesmes nuns erected cloisters and a church, designed by Edward Goldie (1856–1921), the son of the prolific Catholic architect George Goldie. The Church was solemnly dedicated to St Cecilia on 12 October 1907.

=== Ryde ===
On the return of the nuns of Ste-Cécile to France in 1922 after 20 years of exile, the community of Pax Cordis Jesu at Ventnor acquired the vacant property at Appley that came to be known as St Cecilia's Abbey, Ryde.

In 1950, after more than half a century of close contact with that congregation, St Cecilia's Abbey itself became part of the Solesmes Congregation.

In 1974, Pope Paul VI issued Jubilate Deo, a selection of plainchant pieces, to encourage the singing of Simple Gregorian melodies in parishes. The Community recorded the chant to support this endeavour, in what was the first recording of nuns in the UK. Between 1980 and 1992, the Community produced nine more recordings of their chant.

The nuns also do calligraphy, producing hand-lettered pieces in a variety of styles suitable for framing.

Sister Mary David (1957–2017) spent 22 years in the abbey and was its prioress.

== Overseas ==
In 1967, the first Benedictine foundation for Indian nuns was made at Bangalore, South India, from St Cecilia's. Shanti Nilayam (House of Peace) was raised to an abbey in 1993 and has itself made several foundations. These houses belong to the Benedictine Confederation that has its centre at Sant'Anselmo in Rome.
