= The Liturgical Year =

Dom Guéranger's series of books

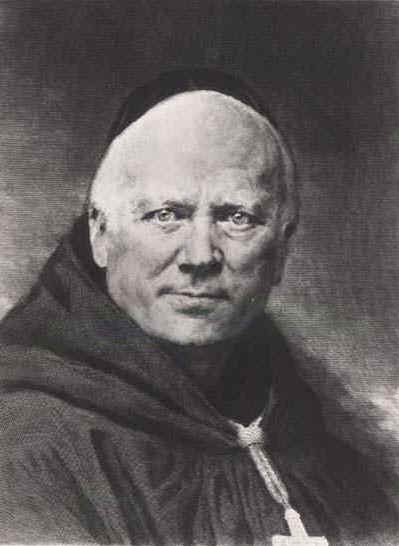
Prosper Guéranger

The Liturgical Year (French: L'Année Liturgique) is a written work in fifteen volumes describing the liturgical year of the Catholic Church. The series was written by Dom Prosper Louis Pascal Guéranger, a French Benedictine priest and abbot of Solesmes. Dom Guéranger began writing the work in 1841, and died in 1875 after writing nine volumes. The remaining volumes were completed by another Benedictine under Dom Guéranger's name.

The series describes the liturgy of the Catholic Church throughout the liturgical year, including the Mass and the Divine Office. Also described is the historical development of the liturgy in both Western and Eastern traditions. Biographies of saints and their liturgies are given on their feast days.

The Liturgical Year has been called the "Summa" of the liturgy of the Catholic Church.

It is a major reference work for Catholics, particularly Traditionalist Catholics.
