= Abbaye de Keur Moussa =

Benedictine monastery in Senegal

- Interactive map of Abbaye de Keur Moussa

Monastery information
- Other name: Abbey of Keur Moussa
- Order: Solesmes Congregation, Order of Saint Benedict
- Established: 1961
- Diocese: Roman Catholic Archdiocese of Dakar

People
- Founder: Monks of Solesmes
- Abbot: Olivier-Marie Sarr
- Prior: Armand Sauvaget

Site
- Location: Dakar, Senegal
- Coordinates: 14.7778°N 17.1242°W

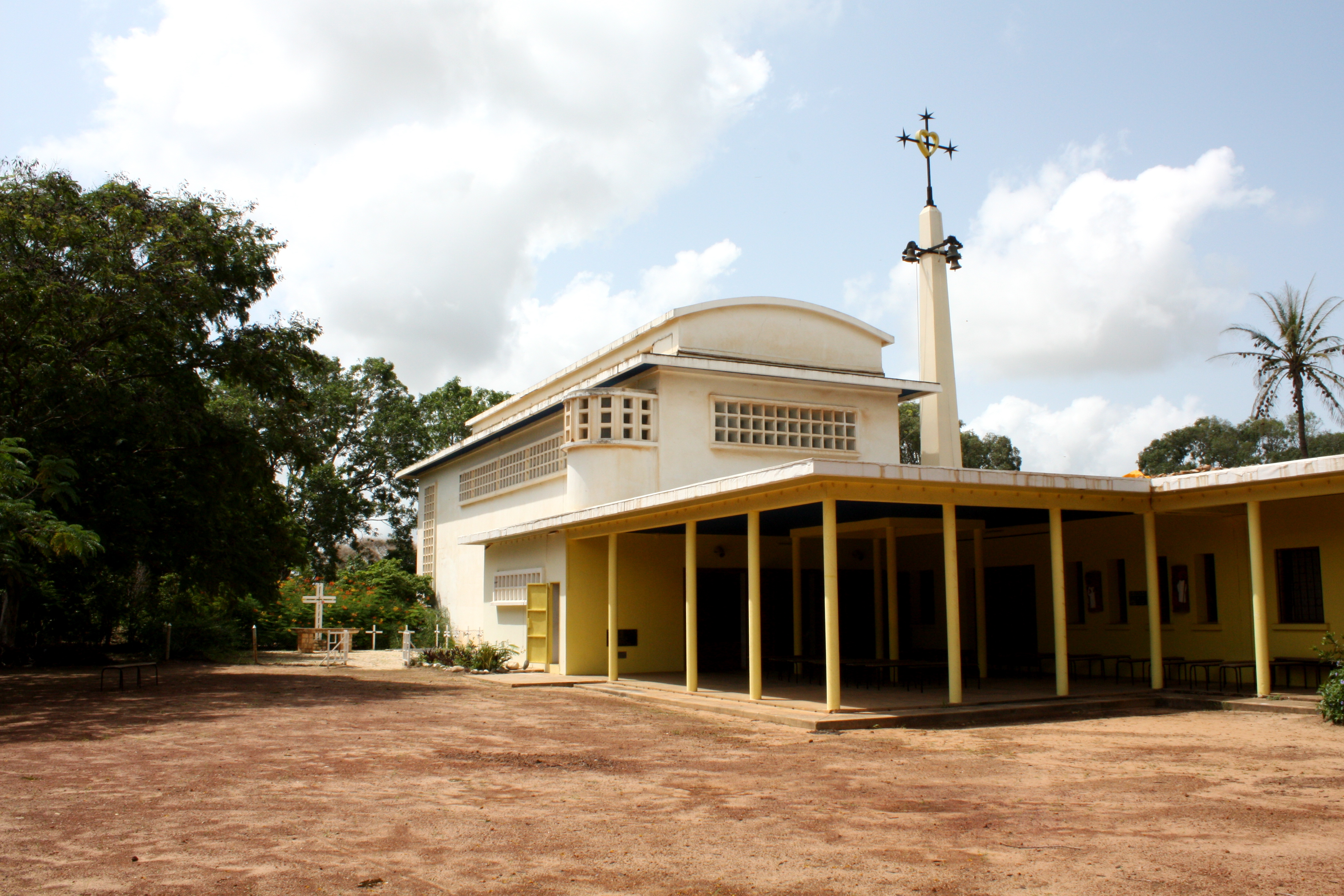
Abbaye de Keur Moussa

Abbaye de Keur Moussa or simply Keur Mousa, near Dakar, the capital city of the Western African nation of Senegal, is a Benedictine monastery of the Solesmes Congregation. Founded in 1961 by French monks, the monastery became an abbey in 1984. As of 2000 the monastery was home to 26 monks under the leadership of Abbot Fr Philippe Champetier de Ribes Christofle. Recordings done by Sacred Spirit Music demonstrate the monks playing the kora harp and singing, and have reached Western audiences. Their music blends African rhythms and instruments with Western liturgical chant.

== History ==
In 1961, nine French monks from the Abbey of Solesmes arrived in Senegal to establish a monastic foundation. In the midst of a largely Islamic country, the founding monks aimed to allow Christians the opportunity to take part in the Benedictine life of prayer and work, and to provide non-Christians with an example of such a lifestyle.

By 1984, the monastery attained complete autonomy, being raised to the rank of an abbey on January 30. Fr Philippe Champetier de Ribes Christofle was elected as the community's first abbot. Two years later, the monastery's church was solemnly dedicated.

== Apostolic Work ==
The monks are primarily engaged in agricultural work: irrigation has allowed for the cultivation of various fruits (grapefruits, oranges, lemons, mangoes, bananas) and vegetables. Additionally, the monks support themselves by producing goat cheese, the traditional West African kora harp, and cassette/CD recordings.

Since the foundation of their community, the monks of Abbaye de Keur Moussa have supported the local Muslim population, providing health care and distributing food to the needy. A medical dispensary and a primary school founded by the monks are now operated by groups of religious sisters and lay people, respectively.

== Personnel ==
The original nine founding monks were Frenchmen from the Abbey of Solesmes. By 1998, two-thirds of the community's approximately 40 members (including novices, postulants, and candidates) were Senegalese.

As of 2000, the community at Keur Moussa included 26 monks, 12 of whom were ordained priests. The monks of Abbaye de Keur Moussa are under the leadership of Abbot Olivier-Marie Sarr, who is assisted in his duties by Armand Sauvaget, prior.

== See also ==
- Order of Saint Benedict
- Solesmes Congregation
- Catholic Church in Senegal
