= Glanfeuil Abbey =

Landmarked historic monastery in Maine-et-Loire, France

Coordinates: 47°23′29″N 0°16′58″W

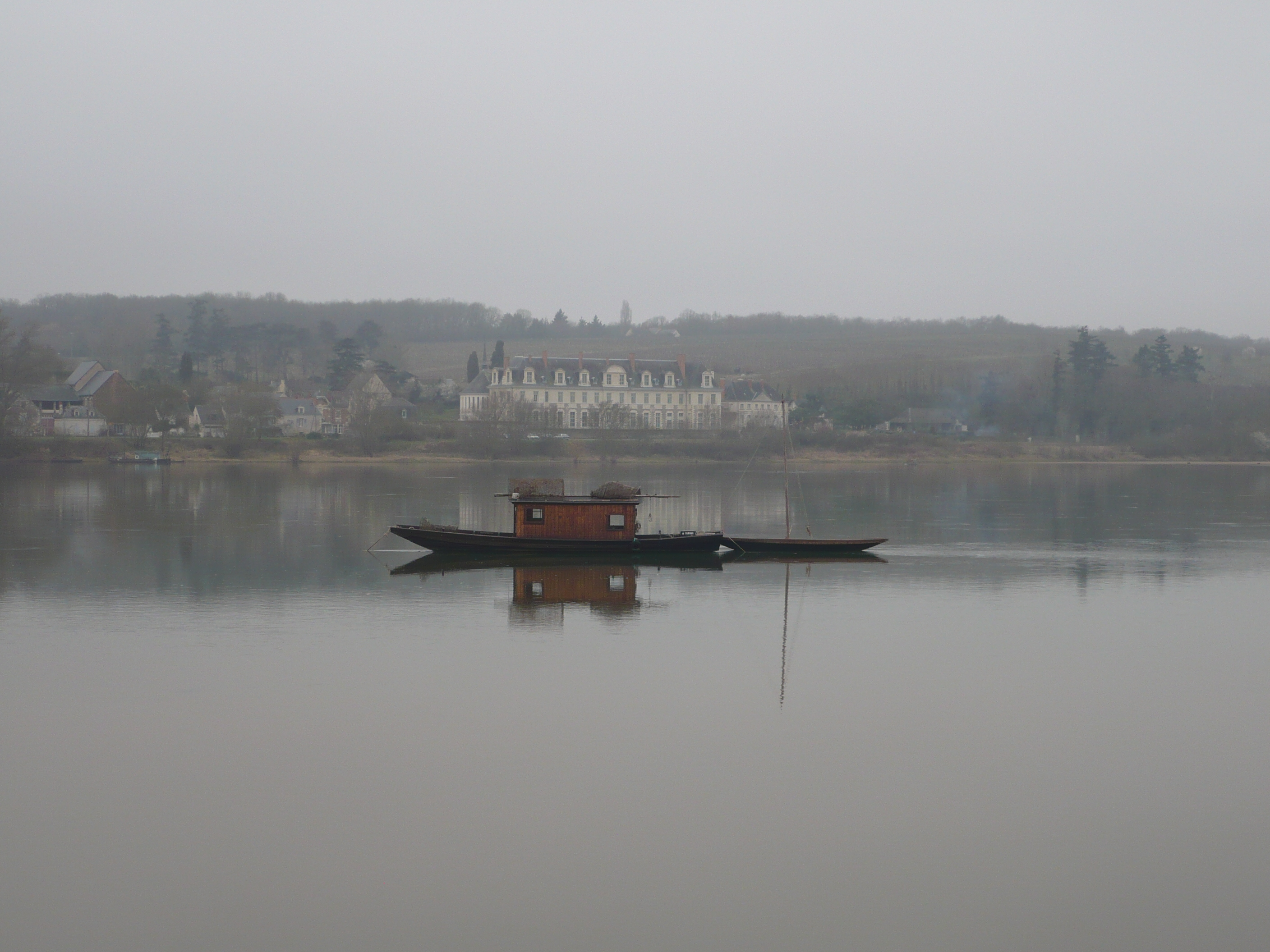
The former abbey buildings seen across the Loire from La Ménitré

Glanfeuil Abbey, otherwise the Abbey of St Maurus (French: Abbaye de Glanfeuil, Abbaye Saint-Maur de Glanfeuil, Abbaye de Saint-Maur-sur-Loire (Note: not to be confused with the Abbey of Saint-Maur-des-Fossés)), was a French Benedictine monastery founded in the Early Middle Ages in the village of Saint-Maur-sur-Loire, located in what is now the commune of Le Thoureil, Maine-et-Loire.

== Traditional account ==
According to the hagiography of Saint Maurus, attributed to Faustus, a student of St. Benedict's, Bertrand, Bishop of Mans, sent his vicar, Harderadus and a companion, to Monte Cassino to ask St. Benedict to send some monks to Gaul. Benedict dispatched twelve monks, including St. Maurus and Faustus. Maurus then established Glanfeuil Abbey, thus making it the original Benedictine foundation in Gaul. This hagiography came into the possession of Abbot Odo of Glanfeuil, though he found the original to be in terrible condition and written in illegible Latin. He copied the original and sought to make the Latin legible, and published his version around 863. Following the work of the protestant Jacques Basnage, the legitimacy of the work came into question. There have been debates about the accuracy of Odo's copy to the original, and, on rarer occasions, whether the original even existed with both detractors and supporters of the Vita.

== History ==
Besides the hagiography of Saint Maurus, there are no other records regarding the initial founding of Glanfeuil Abbey. Excavations at the end of the nineteenth century disclosed a possible Merovingian monastery built on the ruins of a Roman villa. In the middle of the eighth century the abbey came, though a grant by king Pepin the Short, into the possession of Gaidulf of Ravenna, who then depleted its resources until the monastery itself was little more than a ruin.

By about 830, the abandoned monastery had come into the possession of Rorgon I, Count of Maine, possibly through his wife, Bilichilde. Together, they undertook to restore the abbey. Abbot Ingelbert of Saint-Pierre-des-Fossés sent some monks, including the count's brother, Gausbert.

In 835 Ebroin's cousin, Count Rorgon, petitioned King Pippin of Aquitaine for the monastery of Glanfeuil on behalf of his relative Ebroin. Glanfeuil had been placed under the authority of another relative of Ebroin's, Abbot Ingelbert of Saint-Pierre-des-Fossés, by the Emperor Louis the Pious in 833. Ebroin became Bishop of Poitiers, and in 844 bestowed the office of abbot on Gausbert's son Gauslin. On 14 July 847 Charles the Bald confirmed Ebroin's right of possession of the abbey, apparently without oversight from Fossés, and its heritability in his family. It was during the tenure of Abbot Gauslin that, around 845, the supposed remains of Saint Maurus were discovered.

In 862, under threat of Norman attacks, Abbot Odo and the monks left Glanfeuil, taking the relics of St. Maurus with them. They eventually wound up at Saint-Pierre-des-Fossés, where Odo was chosen to succeed the recently deceased Abbot Geoffrey. It was during the time of evacuation of Glanfeuil that Odo came upon the Life of Saint Maurus in the hands of a traveler from Italy.

The original monastery was rebuilt and flourished. It was suppressed in 1790 in the wake of the French Revolution. Eventually it was refounded in the surviving structures in 1890, by Louis-Charles Couturier, O.S.B., the Abbot of Solesmes Abbey, as part of his program of revival of monasticism in post-revolutionary France.

In 1901, however, the monks were compelled to leave France due to the anti-clerical laws of the Third French Republic. After finding refuge in Baronville, Belgium (now part of the municipality of Beauraing), the monks began to search for a permanent home. After various inquires failed, they finally settled upon Clervaux, Luxembourg. In 1908, a vote was taken by the monastic chapter, which made the decision to dissolve the existing monastery, and to found a new monastery there, dedicated to St. Maurice.

The abbey premises later belonged to the Assumptionists until the 1980s, when they sold it to the Apprentis d'Auteuil, a charity for the education and training of orphans. As they were unable to build workshops on the site, they sold it on to the departmental council of Maine-et-Loire.

For some years the former abbey has been run by the O.V.A.L. association (Organisation de Vacances, Animations et Loisirs) for residential courses for schools and as a holiday centre outside term times.

The building has been recorded as a monument historique since 1958.
