= Totah =

Totah is a surname. Notable people with the surname include:

- Josie Totah (born 2001), American actress
- Mary Totah (1957-2017), American Benedictine prioress of abbey on the Isle of Wight

== See also ==
- Totah Vista, New Mexico, unincorporated community in the United States
