= Jean Leclercq (monk) =

French Benedictine monk (1911–1993)

The Reverend Jean Leclercq OSB
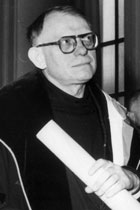

Orders
- Ordination: 19 September 1936

Personal details
- Born: 31 January 1911 Avesnes, France
- Died: 27 October 1993 (aged 82)
- Buried: Clervaux Abbey in Luxembourg
- Denomination: Roman Catholic
- Occupation: Professor
- Profession: Benedictine Monk

Jean Leclercq OSB (31 January 1911 – 27 October 1993), was a French Benedictine monk, the author of classic studies on Lectio Divina and the history of inter-monastic dialogue, as well as the life and theology of Saint Bernard of Clairvaux. LeClercq is perhaps best known in the English speaking world for his seminal work The Love of Learning and the Desire for God: A Study of Monastic Culture.

== Early life ==
Leclercq was born in Avesnes, Pas-de-Calais, in 1911 as the second of four children. His family moved a great deal due to the first world war. From 1920 to 1928 he attended the College of St-Pierre-de-Fourmies. As a young man, he sought to enter Clervaux Abbey in Luxembourg as a brother, but was twice refused. Instead, he was finally accepted only as a postulant for the priesthood. On 22 September 1928, he was received as a postulant. On 24 June 1929, he would be received as a novice. On 29 June 1930, he would make his simple vows as a Benedictine monk. He then began his two-year study of Philosophy at Clervaux Abbey. Upon completion, he then served one year of military service as a second gunner in the artillery at Metz in Lorraine. He then moved to complete his theological studies at the Benedictine Pontifical University of Sant'Anselmo in Rome, Italy, from October 1933 to June 1937. He was ordained to the priesthood on 19 September 1936. He then transferred to the Institut Catholique of Paris to complete his final year of theological studies.

== War years ==
While returning to Clervaux to teach Dogma for one year, it was the war that would change the trajectory of his life. In September 1939 he would be called to service in an anti-aircraft artillery battery. On the day before the invasion of Belgium, Holland, and Luxembourg, he would defend his thesis at the Institut Catholique of Paris on the subject of John of Paris, a disciple of Thomas Aquinas. He would spend time at other abbeys before undertaking research and cataloging Latin manuscripts at the Bibliothèque nationale de France from 1941 to 1944. It was at Engelberg Abbey in the winter of 1945–1946 that he would discover in their library some unpublished texts of Saint Bernard of Clairvaux. It would be the beginning of his extensive work on the saint that would lead to the later publication of the critical edition of the complete works of Saint Bernard of Clairvaux.

== The Love of Learning and the Desire for God: A Study of Monastic Culture ==
While Leclercq certainly became the medieval expert on the life of Saint Bernard of Clairvaux, it would be another work that would cement his fame in the circle of Benedictine monasticism. In the year 1956 Leclercq would begin a series of lectures both in Milan and at the Benedictine University in Rome which would form the foundation of his later published work known in English as The Love of Learning and the Desire for God: A Study of Monastic Culture. He travelled throughout the United States in 1959 and would meet another famous monk, Thomas Merton. They would become life-long friends and correspond regularly on matters especially of monastic life. In these early years Leclercq would begin to offer to the world a decided shift in orientation in how monastic life and monastic theology was to be understood, lived, and taught.

=== Monastic life ===
From his vast survey of monastic history, Leclercq proposed that monastic life was ultimately about a contemplative life. He wrote that "Every clear definition of the monastic life will be inadequate since the reality of the spiritual character that constitutes it will always be richer and more mysterious than anyone can express". The scholar Gregory Penco noted how Lecercq helped nuance this understanding of monastic life since "the contemplative life was something different from contemplation in that the first indicated a general orientation of life whereas the second referred to higher and priviledged moments (therefore, the exceptional situations) of that same life." In essence, contemplation and the monastic life were not the same. A monk was always contemplative even if he lived it out in varying ways. For a contemplative life indicated a general orientation of life (sometimes called "eschatological" orientation) whereas contemplation were those special moments of grace. Thus, the main orientation and focus of a monk is eschatological irrespective of the task to which they have been assigned.

=== Monastic theology ===
The second major contribution in his work was to highlight what he found in his survey of Church history to be a distinctive Monastic Theology that had been overtaken by the more recent Scholastic Theology. When Leclercq undertook to examine the Rule of Saint Benedict, he found that monastic life was grounded in the monastery with a life of (1) Liturgy, (2) Scriptures, and (3) Church Fathers. Spiritually and theologically this was lived out in (1) Lectio Divina, (2) Meditation, (3) Prayer, and (4) Contemplation. For Monastic Theology, you would never separate spirituality from theology since they were so intertwined. From his overview of Church history, he then offered that approximately the first six centuries were grounded in a Patristic Theology. This was followed by a Monastic Theology until approximately the 12th century, to be followed by approximately six centuries of Scholastic Theology. Leclercq did not see Scholastic Theology as somehow in opposition to Monastic Theology, but rather complementary. Monastic Theology, in addition to the above items noted, would focus on such things as mystery, symbols, subjectivity and experience, Affectus Fidei, and the dialectic. For Leclercq, the key is the Wisdom lens through which one does theology. For Monastic Theology is the lived reality of the faith interwoven in a significant spiritual experience of love and intelligence in order to know the mystery of God in a manner distinct from that which is purely intellectual and rational. Scholastic Theology, in contrast, would be grounded in the Schola with features such as lectures on questions and disputes and sentences, a focus on the Verita de Fede instead of mystery, the heavy use of definitions, a strong focus on objectivity and Intellectus Fidei, and a systematic and analytic approach versus the dialectic approach. In this regard Leclercq especially liked to contrast the work of Saint Bernard of Clairvaux with that of Peter Abelard. Bernard's works was distinctively Sapienza where theology is the contemplation of God and involves love, affection, and speaking of faith only grounded in this. In contrast, Abelard's works focused on a teaching that was grounded in rationale and the scienza of the faith. The Dominican, Marie-Dominique Chenu would echo this and proclaim that Saint Anselm of Canterbury was especially the bridge in these two theologies. In fact, Chenu would say that Monastic Theology and Scholastic Theology were two forms of medieval thought, equally legitimate and valid, and it would be wrong to call Monastic Theology, pre-scholastic. For Leclercq, a helpful distinction was found in the methods: for Monastic Theology Lectio-Meditatio-Oratio-Contemplatio; for Scholastic Theology Lectio-Quaestio-Disputatio-Interpretatio. Leclercq had his supporters and detractors for his views, but his focus was certainly taken up by the Benedictines in the "Sapienza" direction of teaching at their Pontifical Anselmianum in Rome.

== Aide a l’Implantation Monastique (AIM) ==
Aide a l’Implantation Monastique (AIM) begun in 1957 by Abbot Tholens of Slangenburg in Holland, and Fr. Denis Martin, a member of a Benedictine foundation in Morocco. In their examination of monasticism in the developing countries, they became concerned that more assistance (financial, spiritual, and advisory) was needed for fledgling monastic institutions. They decided to form an organization to help coordinate assistance efforts for these Benedictine, Cistercian and Trappist men and women throughout the world. Jean Leclercq was instrumental in those early years of AIM and would travel throughout the world. He made his first visit in 1962 on behalf of AIM to the monastery of Toumlinine in Morocco and would return again in 1964. AIM would delegate him to take part in the first meeting of monks of Africa at Bouaké in the Ivory Coast in 1964. This would be followed by trips to the following countries: Togo, Cameroon, Senegal, Uganda, Kenya, Tanzania, Rwanda, Congo-Kinshasa, Burundi, Madagascar, India, Indonesia, Vietnam, Cambodia, Philippines, Thailand, Japan, Hong Kong, Chile, Argentina, Uruguay, Mexico, Martinique, Korea, New Zealand, Australia, England, Germany, Denmark, Spain, Portugal, Switzerland, and the United States of America.

== Works ==
The most complete bibliography of his works may be found in E. Rozanne Elder, ed, The Joy of Learning and the Love of God: Studies in Honor of Jean Leclercq (Cistercian Studies Series: Number 160, Kalamazoo, MI, 1995), pp 414–498. His articles and books number 1053 items and he was described as "the most influential of all contemporary historians of the Middle Ages" and "the most prolific medievalist of the past fifty years."

== Centre Jean Leclercq ==
On 20 April 2020, a new "Centre/Centro Jean Leclecq" was founded at the Benedictine Pontifical Athenaeum of Saint Anselm in Rome, Italy. The stated purpose was to research and promote the "Leclercqian perspective for interdisciplinary dialogue between history, spirituality, philosophy, theology and liturgy."
