= Ganagobie Abbey =

Abbey in Alpes-de-Haute-Provence, France

Coordinates: 43°59′52″N 5°54′29″E

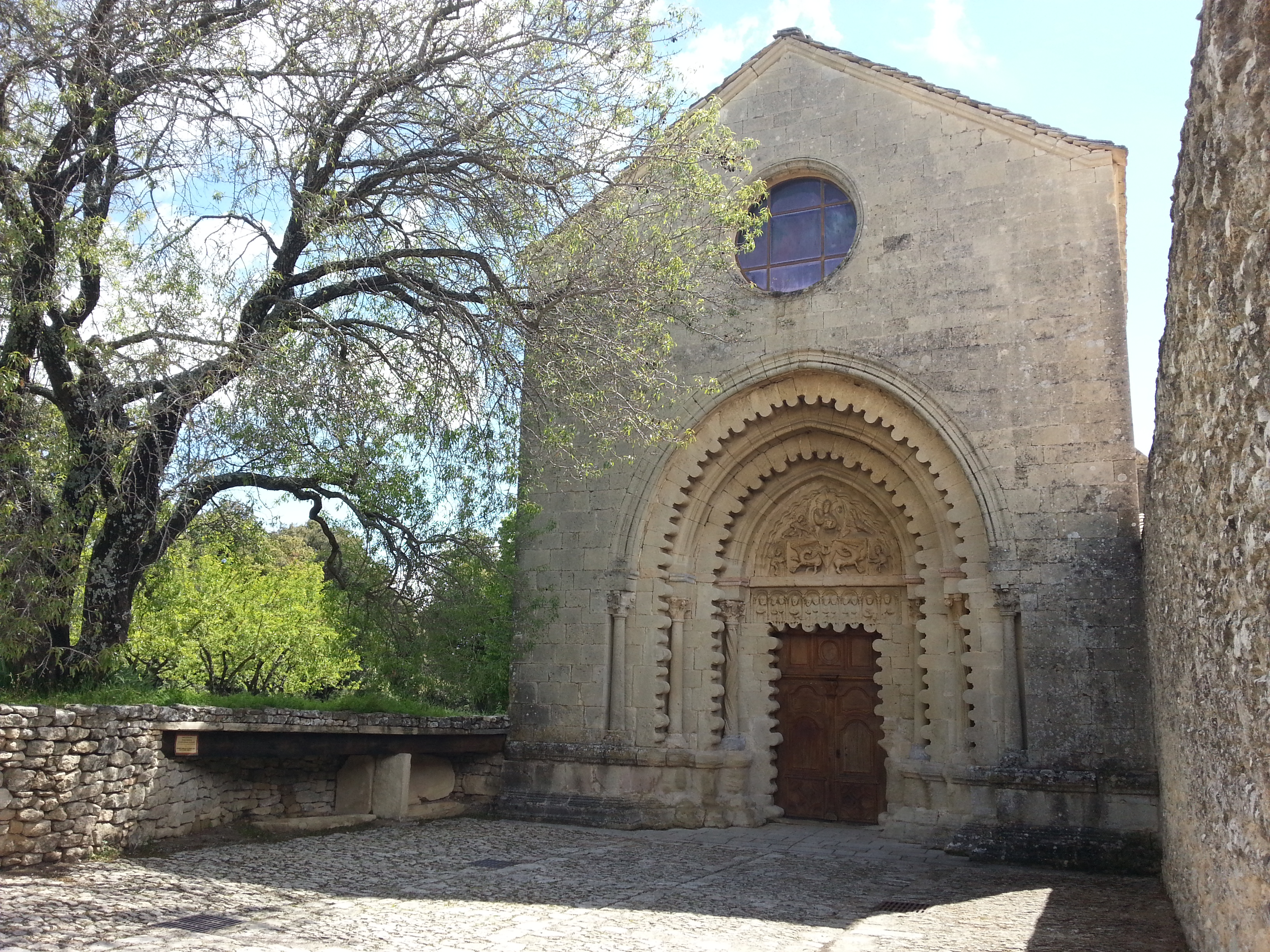
Exterior

Ganagobie Abbey (French: Abbaye Notre-Dame de Ganagobie) is a Benedictine monastery in Ganagobie in the department of Alpes-de-Haute-Provence, France. It is part of the Solesmes Congregation of the Benedictine Confederation and as such focuses on Gregorian chant.

== A Cluniac Priory ==
The first monastic foundation on this remote and mountainous site appears to date from the 9th or 10th century. Among the first documentary records is a bull of Pope Stephen VIII in 939 confirming the possessions of Cluny Abbey, among them the monastery at Ganagobie. It was suppressed in 1789 under the Ancien Régime and sold off in 1791 during the course of the French Revolution, after which large parts of the buildings were demolished.

== Gift to Marseilles Priory ==
In 1865 the Benedictines of Solesmes under Dom Prosper Guéranger founded the Priory of St. Madeleine in Marseilles, or Marseilles Priory. In 1891 the Comte de Malijay, by that time the owner of the priory site at Ganagobie, made a gift of it to the Marseilles Priory. In the course of repair and restoration work on the new property, important medieval mosaics were discovered in 1898.

== A Dependency of Hautecombe Abbey ==
In 1901 however the community at Marseilles were forced by the Association Laws to leave France. They took refuge in Italy and did not return until 1922, when they took up residence at Hautecombe Abbey, of which Ganagobie was from then on a priory, of one or two monks only.

== A Benedictine Abbey ==
In 1987, after decades of restoration work, the whole community of Hautecombe decided to move to Ganagobie, which they did in 1992.

== Sources ==
- Ganagobie Abbey official website
