= Ebroin (bishop) =

Ebroin (died 850-54) was bishop of Poitiers from 839 to his death. He took on the administration of the county of Poitiers during a troubled period and continued to faithfully support King Charles the Bald.

In 835 Ebroin's cousin, Count Rorig I of Maine, petitioned King Pippin I for the monastery of Glanfeuil to be given to Ebroin. Glanfeuil had been placed under the authority of another relative of Ebroin's, Abbot Ingelbert of Saint-Pierre-des-Fossés, by the Emperor Louis the Pious in 833. In 844 Ebroin bestowed the office of abbot on Rorig's son Gauslin. On 14 July 847 Charles confirmed Ebroin's right of possession (ius [et] dominatio) of abbey, apparently without oversight from Fossés, and its heritability in his family.

In 839 Ebroin sided with Charles the Bald against Pippin II in the battle for the subkingdom of Aquitaine, which had been ruled by Pippin I, Charles' brother and Pippin's father, until his death in 838. According to the Vita Hludovici, Ebroin was Charles's advisor on Aquitainian affairs. Between Charles's first visit to Poitiers in April 839 and February 840, when the emperor left him in charge of conducting a campaign against Pippin II, Charles appointed Ebroin as his archchaplain.

Ebroin was among the leaders of the army being assembled to fight Pippin in northern Aquitaine 844. On 14 June 844, while on the march south to meet Charles in the south, the army was ambushed by Pippin's forces in the Angoumois. The king's uncle, Abbot Hugh, was killed, and Ebroin, along with Bishop Ragenar of Amiens and Abbot Lupus of Ferrières, was captured. Ebroin had been freed by December 844, when he attended the council of Ver. He helped negotiate the settlement of June 845, in which most of Aquitaine was ceded to Pippin in vassalage to Charles.

There is no record of Ebroin after 850. It is usually assumed that he died defending Poitiers from some rebels in 854. It is also possible that Charles's execution of a probable relative of Ebroin's, a certain Count Gauzbert, in March 853 pushed Ebroin into rebellion. He was replaced as archchaplain by Hilduin the Younger.

== Sources ==
- Bloch, Herbert (1952). "The Schism of Anacletus II and the Glanfeuil Forgeries of Peter the Deacon of Monte Cassino". Traditio. 8: 159–264.
- Levillain, Léon (1923). "L'archichapelain Ebroin, évêque de Poitiers". Le Moyen Âge. 34: 177–222.
- Nelson, J. L. (1992). Charles the Bald. London: Longman.
- Wood, Susan (2006). The Proprietary Church in the Medieval West. Oxford: Oxford University Press.
