= Ligugé Abbey =

Benedictine monastery in France

Abbey of St. Martin of Ligugé
- Abbaye Saint-Martin de Ligugé
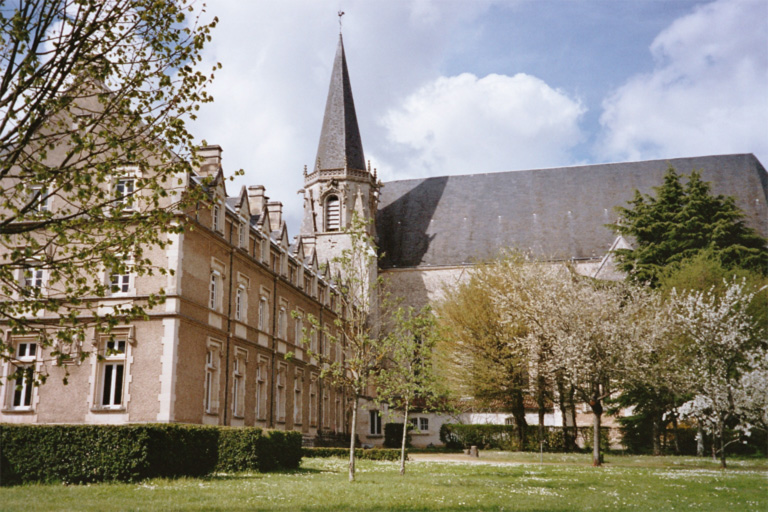

- Location within France
- Interactive map of Abbey of St. Martin of Ligugé

Monastery information
- Other name: Ligugé Abbey
- Order: Benedictine
- Established: 361; 1853
- Disestablished: 1792
- Mother house: Solesmes Abbey
- Dedication: Martin of Tours
- Diocese: Poitiers
- Controlled churches: Saint-Martin en Poitou

People
- Founders: Martin of Tours; Prosper Guéranger
- Abbot: André-Junien Guérit
- Archbishop: Pascal Wintzer
- Important associated figures: Martin of Tours

Architecture
- Functional status: abbey

Site
- Location: 2 place A. Lambert, 86240 Ligugé, France
- Coordinates: 46°31′2″N 0°19′52″E

Ligugé Abbey, formally called the Abbey of St. Martin of Ligugé (French: Abbaye Saint-Martin de Ligugé), is a French Benedictine monastery in the Commune of Ligugé, located in the Department of Vienne. The monastery, founded in 361, is the oldest monastery known in western Europe. The original abbey having been destroyed during the French Revolution, the current monastic community dates from 1853, and belongs to the Solesmes Congregation.

== First foundation ==
The original monastery was founded in 361, at a site offered by the bishop Hilary of Poitiers, to Hilary's protégé Martin of Tours, to whom it was later dedicated. The site was described as "deserted" in early writings about the abbey, such as the account of the noted historian, Gregory of Tours, who made a pilgrimage to the abbey in 591 to honor his predecessor in the episcopal see. Modern excavations, have identified a Gallo-Roman villa at the site. The reputation of the founder attracted a large number of disciples to the new monastery. The monks initially lived according to the pattern of the Desert Fathers of Egypt, each in his locaciacum (small hut), this name later evolving to Ligugé. When, however, Martin became Bishop of Tours and established a monastery at Marmoutier a short distance from that city, the fame of Ligugé declined considerably.

Among Martin's successors as Abbots of Ligugé may be mentioned Savin, later honored as a saint, who resigned the post of abbot to become a hermit, and Abbot Ursinus, during whose rule the monk Defensor compiled the well-known "Scintillarum Liber".

The invasion of the Saracens, the wars of the Dukes of Aquitaine with the early Carolingians, and lastly the Norman invasion were a series of disasters that almost destroyed the monastery. By the 11th century, it had sunk to the position of a dependent priory attached to Maillezais Abbey. It was revitalized in 1003 by the re-establishment of a shrine to St. Martin, its founder, by Adalemode of Limoges, wife of the Count of Poitiers, William V, Duke of Aquitaine. The shrine grew in prominence as a place of pilgrimage until the occupation of the priory by English troops in 1359 and its subsequent destruction by the French forces to prevent its becoming a staging point for relief to the English armies.

The priory reached its lowest level in 1501, when it became a benefice held in commendam. The first of the commendatory priors, Geoffrey d'Estissac, a great patron of literature and the friend of Rabelais, built the existing church, a graceful structure but smaller by far than the ancient basilica which it replaced. Rabelais was a guest of the priory for a time, a period he used to edit his early works.

During the 16th century, the priory was badly damaged as a result of the conflicts during the War of Religions, and, on 4 February 1607, King Henry IV gave the priory, over the objections of the city's residents, to the Society of Jesus, who made major renovations to the buildings and continued to maintain the practice of the Divine Office in the church. They opened a college for Irish students there, as well as having it serve as a country house for the Jesuit Fathers. This situation continued until the suppression of the Society in 1762, when the site came under the direction of the local bishop, despite the opposition to this by the Benedictines of the Congregation of Saint Maur.

At the French Revolution the buildings and lands were sold as national property, the church being used for some time as the Municipal Council chamber. With the re-establishment of the Catholic Church under the Bourbon restoration, the former monastery church was dedicated as a parish church, a function which it continues to serve for the Parish of Saint-Martin en Poitou. The current pastor, as of September 2014, is Thierry de Mascarel.

== Second foundation ==
In 1849 Louis-Edouard-François-Desiré Pie, afterwards cardinal, became the Bishop of Poitiers. He was a close friend of Prosper Guéranger, the re-founder of the French Benedictine Congregation, and on 19 November 1853 he gave formal approval for the restoration of monastic life at the monastery. Five days later, a small community of four monks arrived from Solesmes Abbey, led by Abbot Guéranger, and established themselves at Ligugé. This was the first daughter house of Solesmes. At first a priory dependent on that abbey, the new foundation was raised in 1864 to the rank of an independent abbey by Pope Pius IX, and Guéranger appointed Léon Bastide to be its first abbot.

In 1880 the monks were driven from the abbey by the "Ferry Laws". Many of them, under the leadership of Abbot Joseph Bourigaud took refuge at the ancient Abbey of Santo Domingo de Silos in Spain, which they rebuilt and saved from extinction.

Some years later the buildings at Ligugé were sold to a civil syndicate, by which they were leased to the abbot and community, who were thus enabled to re-enter their monastery. They then started a printing press as a means of supporting themselves. Today that operation has become an independent publishing house called Aubin. Candidates began to come in considerable numbers and, by 1893, the community was able to found what is now the Abbey of Sainte-Marie in Paris, and, the following year, the ancient Abbey of Saint-Wandrille in Normandy was resettled by a community of monks from Ligugé.

Among the visitors to the abbey during this period were Joris-Karl Huysmans, who became an oblate of the abbey, and Paul Claudel, who spent time there as a postulant, both of whom wrote of their experiences at Ligugé in L'Oblat and Partage de Midi respectively.

In 1902 the community was again driven out, this time by the Association Laws, and settled at Chevetogne Abbey, Belgium. On their return, they had the abbey church re-constructed; it was consecrated on 12 October 1929.

During World War II the abbey gave shelter to Robert Schuman, the future distinguished French politician and champion of the European Union, in August 1942 while he was waiting for passage to the free zone, as well as to Amadou-Mahtar M'Bow of Senegal, future Director General of UNESCO. A member of the monastic community, Aimé Lambert, was a member of the French resistance, who was captured by the Gestapo and beheaded at the prison in Wolfenbüttel, Germany, on 3 December 1943.

After the war an enamelling workshop was set up here.

The community, as of 2013, consists of some 25 monks.

== Abbots of Ligugé (Second foundation) ==
- Léon Bastide, O.S.B., 1864–1877
- Joseph Bourigaud, O.S.B., 1877–1906
- François-Léopold Gaugain, O.S.B., 1906–1936
- Pierre Basset, O.S.B., 1936–1953
- Gabriel Le Maître, O.S.B., 1954-1963
- Vacancy 1963-1966
- Pierre Miquel, O.S.B., 1966-1990
- Jean-Pierre Longeat, O.S.B., 1990-2014
- André-Junien Guérit, O.S.B., 2014-2018
- Christophe Bettwy, O.S.B., elected on 3 April 2018 (entered the abbey in 1998)
