= Jubilate Deo =

1974 chant booklet

Jubilate Deo is a small hymnal of Gregorian chant in the Latin Rite of the Catholic Church, produced after the liturgical reforms of Vatican II. It contains a selection of chants used in the Mass and various liturgies (e.g. Benediction of the Blessed Sacrament), as well as Marian antiphons and seasonal hymns.

== History ==
In 1974, Pope Paul VI presented the document as a “minimum repertoire of Gregorian chant”, for use of the faithful. In promulgating the hymnal, the Congregation for Divine Worship stated the book would be “extremely useful if the faithful learn the chants contained in the volume, as the Pope and the Congregation for Divine Worship intend.”

The Maltese choir, Jubilate Deo, is named after this document.

== Contents ==
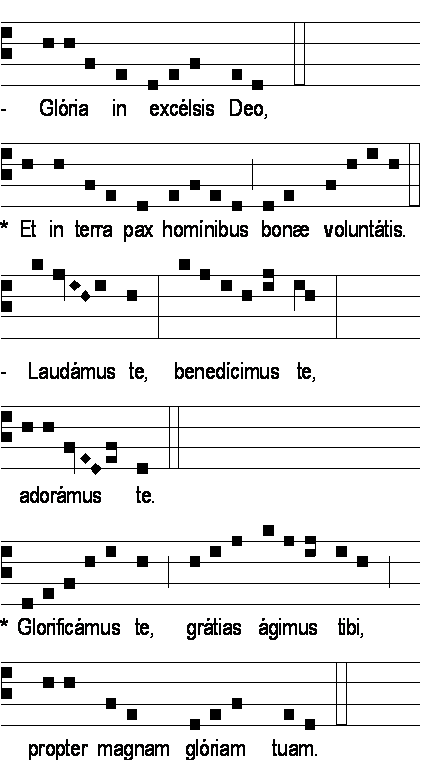

Chants of the Ordinary

- Kyrie XVI
- Gloria VIII
- Credo III
- Sanctus XVIII
- Pater Noster
- Agnus Dei XVIII
- Verbum Domini
- Mysterium Fidei
- Ite Missa est

Hymns

- Adoro Te Devote
- Alma Redemptoris Mater
- Ave maris stella
- Ave Regina caelorum
- O Salutaris Hostia
- Pange Lingua/Tantum Ergo
- Parce Domine
- Regina caeli
- Salve Regina
- Veni Creator Spiritus
- Ubi Caritas
