= Solesmes, Sarthe =

Solesmes
- Commune
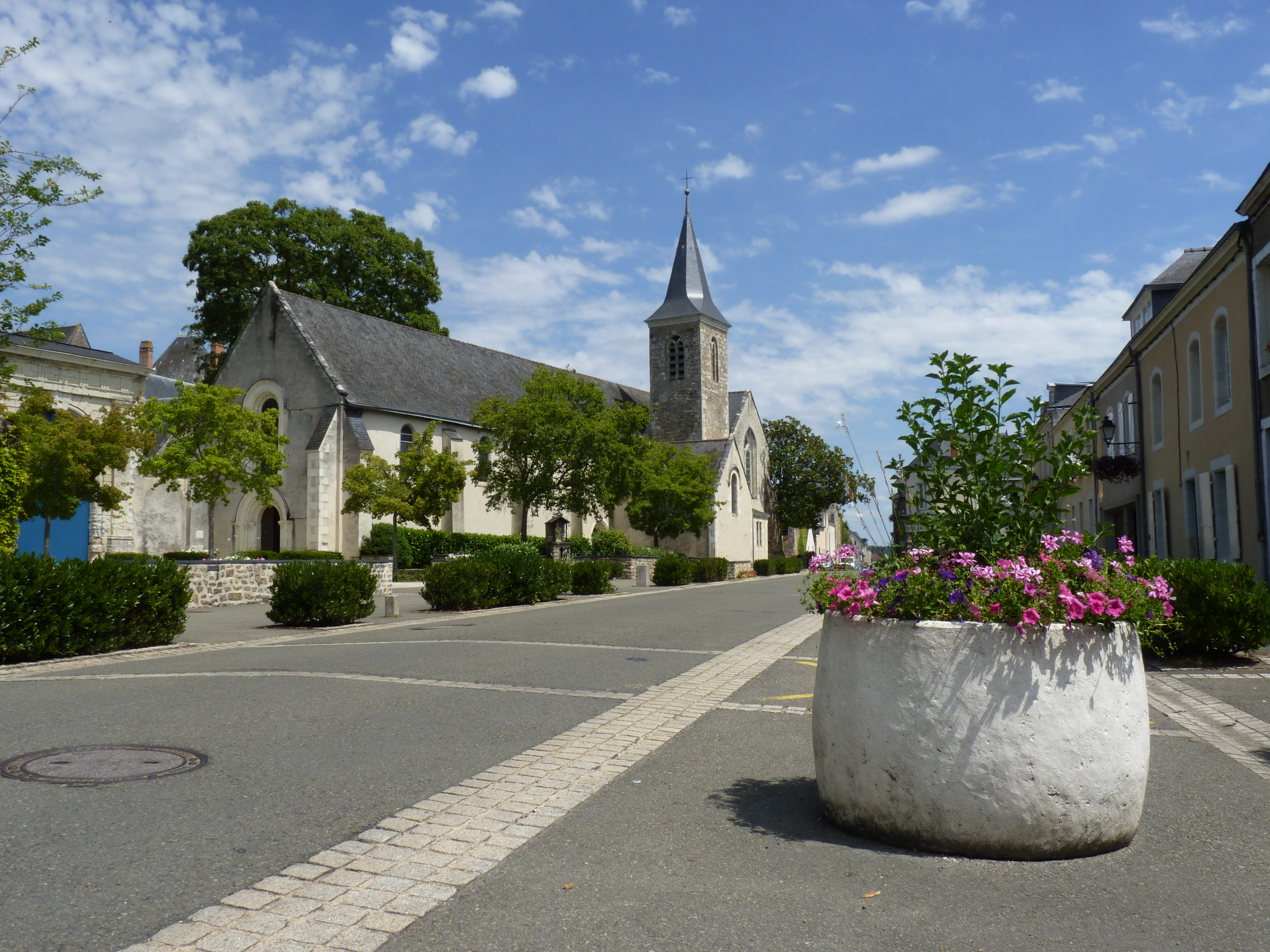
- A view in the village of Solesmes

- Coat of arms
- Location of Solesmes
- Location within France Location within Pays de la Loire
- Coordinates: 47°51′09″N 0°18′02″W
- Country: France
- Region: Pays de la Loire
- Department: Sarthe
- Arrondissement: La Flèche
- Canton: Sablé-sur-Sarthe
- Intercommunality: CC Pays Sabolien

Government
  - Mayor (2020–2026): Pascal Lelièvre
- Area^{1}: 11.53 km^{2} (4.45 sq mi)
- Highest elevation: 76 m (249 ft)
- Lowest elevation: 22 m (72 ft)
- Population (2023): 1,240
  - Density: 108/km^{2} (279/sq mi)
- Time zone: UTC+01:00 (CET)
  - Summer (DST): UTC+02:00 (CEST)
- INSEE/Postal code: 72336 /72300
- ^{1} French Land Register data, which excludes lakes, ponds, glaciers > 1 km^{2} (0.386 sq mi or 247 acres) and river estuaries.

Solesmes (French pronunciation: [sɔlɛm]) is a commune in the Sarthe department and Pays de la Loire region of north-western France.

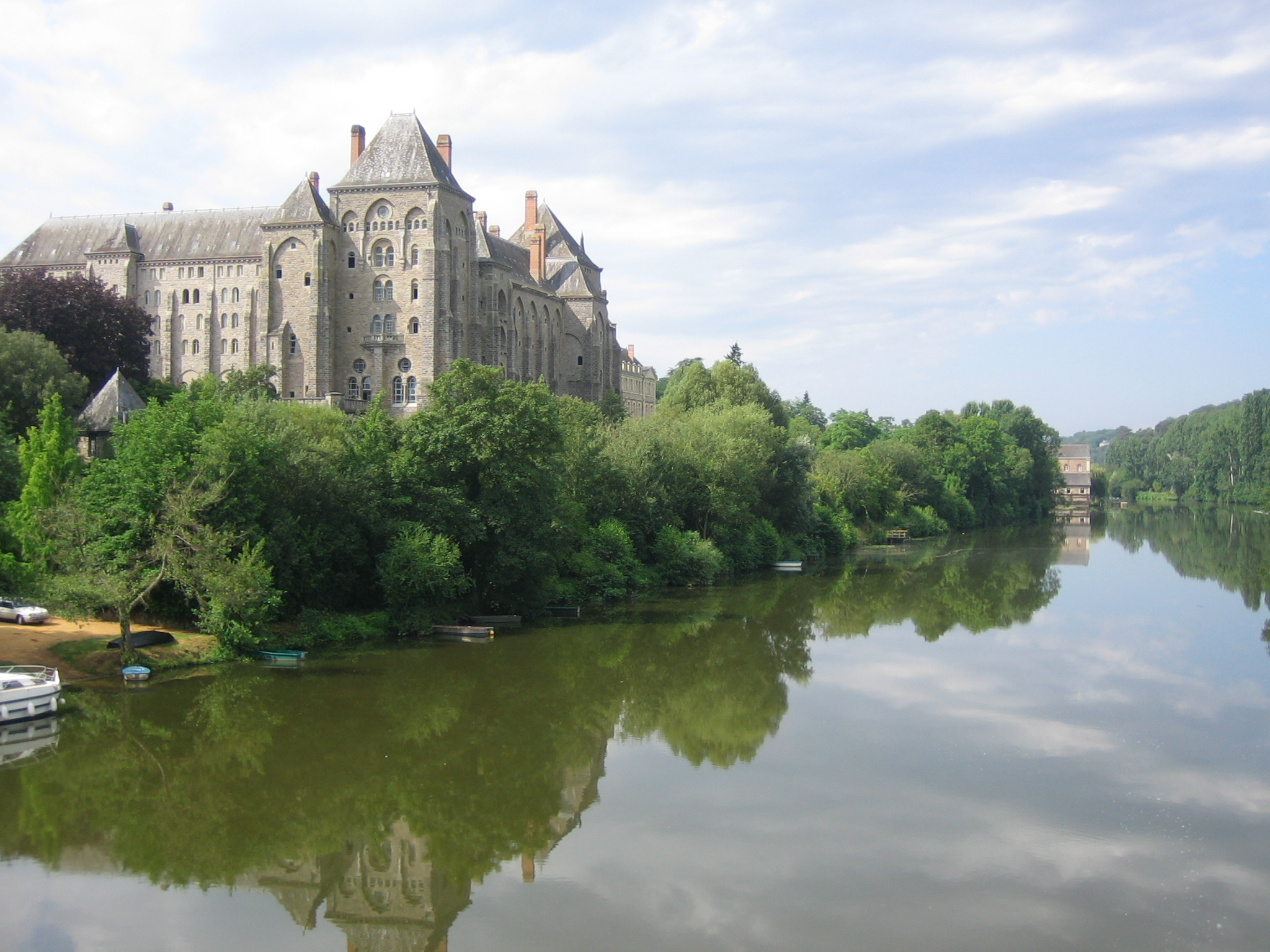
St Peter's Abbey, Solesmes

Lying close to the small town of Sablé-sur-Sarthe and almost entirely agricultural in character, the commune is especially noted as the site of the Benedictine Abbey of St Peter, founded in 1010, suppressed by the National Constituent Assembly in 1791, and re-established by Dom Prosper Guéranger in 1833. A second abbey for women, St Cecilia's, is also located here.

== See also ==
- Communes of the Sarthe department
