= Cécile Bruyère =

French abbess

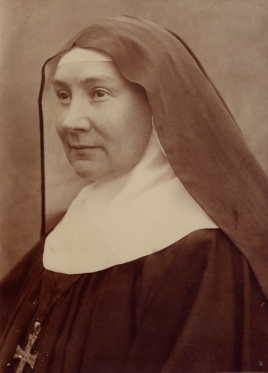

Mère Cécile Bruyère (12 October 1845 – 18 March 1909) was the first abbess of St. Cecilia's Abbey, Solesmes (Abbaye Sainte-Cécile de Solesmes) and a follower of Dom Prosper Guéranger in the revival of Benedictine spirituality in 19th century France.

== Life ==
She was born as Jeanne-Henriette Bruyère (and went by Jenny), the granddaughter of the architect and engineer Louis Bruyère and the architect Jacques-Marie Huvé. Her family lived at Sablé-sur-Sarthe.

She was sent to Dom Prosper Guéranger, founder of Solesmes Abbey and the reviver of the French Benedictine tradition, to be prepared for her first communion, and became his spiritual daughter. In 1866, with Dom Guéranger's support, she founded the first women's house within his French Benedictine Congregation (now the Solesmes Congregation). The new nunnery was dedicated to Saint Cecilia (Sainte Cécile) because of Dom Guéranger's devotion to her. Jenny Bruyère herself as a child had always desired to be called by that name, after her maternal grandmother. She took the name Cécile as her confirmation name in 1858, and kept the same name in religious life.

Although St. Cecilia's was still only a priory, Cécile Bruyère was named abbess of the new foundation at the age of 24 by Pope Pius IX on 20 June 1870. This may have been a gesture of thanks towards Dom Guéranger for his great support to the Pope at the First Vatican Council in favour of the recently proclaimed dogma of Papal infallibility.

Mother Cécile, with the support of Dom Guéranger, wrote the nunnery's constitutions, which were influential beyond her own nunnery. Of especial note are the re-establishment of the office of abbess with its symbols (the ring, the pectoral cross and the crozier), and of the long-forgotten rite of the consecration of virgins.

Her nuns, in accordance with the thought of Dom Guéranger and the Congregation he established, learned Latin and Gregorian chant, which was altogether exceptional at that time. This remains the practice of the abbey and of the Solesmes Congregation.

The French anti-religious laws of the early 20th century forced the whole community into exile in England, to the forerunner of the present St. Cecilia's Abbey, Ryde, on the Isle of Wight, where on 18 March 1909 Mother Cécile died. When the community was at last able to return to Solesmes, in 1921, her body was also transported and re-buried there.

== Works ==
Mother Cécile's spiritual thought and teaching, entirely inherited from Dom Guéranger but presented with the benefit of many years' experience in Benedictine life and meditation, is well summarised in her book La vie spirituelle et l'oraison, d'après la Sainte Ecriture et la tradition monastique, reprinted many times and translated into several languages. In this she explains the primary importance of the liturgy in the religious life in developing the specific grace arising from the sacrament of baptism. In 2019, an English translation of this work is available from an American publisher, Wipf & Stock.

== Sources ==
- La vie spirituelle et l'oraison, ISBN 2-85274-085-0
- Solesmes Abbey website: foundation of St. Cecilia's Abbey (in French)
