= Solesmes Congregation =

Association of Benedictine monasteries

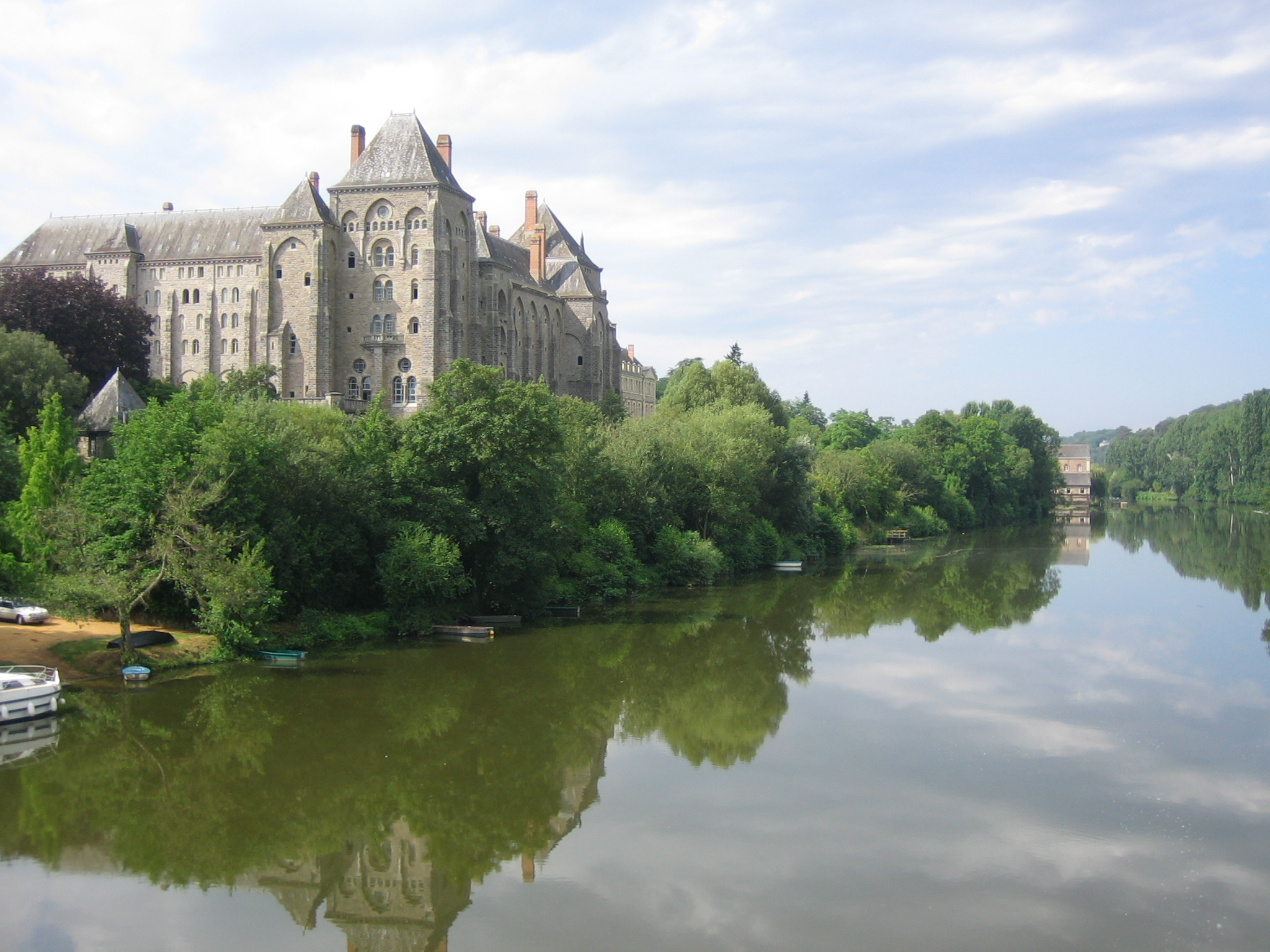
- St. Peter's Abbey, Solesmes
- Abbreviation: O.S.B.
- Formation: c. AD 1837; 189 years ago
- Founder: Pope Gregory XVI
- Type: Catholic religious order
- Superior General: Abbot Geoffrey Kemlin, O.S.B.
- Website: www.solesmes.com

The Solesmes Congregation is an association of monasteries within the Benedictine Confederation headed by the Abbey of Solesmes.

== History ==
The congregation was founded in 1837 by Pope Gregory XVI as the French Benedictine Congregation, with the then newly reopened Solesmes Abbey, founded by Dom Prosper Guéranger, O.S.B., who wished to re-establish France's ancient and rich presence of monastic life, which had been wiped out by the French Revolution. The first foundation of the new congregation in 1853 was Ligugé Abbey, founded by St. Martin of Tours in 361. In course of time other daughterhouses were founded from Solesmes: in 1880 the Abbey of Santo Domingo de Silos in Spain, Glanfeuil in 1892, and Fontenelle in 1893. These four were old monasteries restored. The congregation's first monastery of women was St. Cecilia's Abbey, Solesmes, founded in 1866 by Guéranger and Cécile Bruyère.

Some of the monasteries of the congregation, especially in France, use the pre-conciliar Latin liturgy, and most of them focus on Gregorian chant. One of its abbeys, Santo Domingo de Silos Abbey, became internationally famous when an album its monks recorded in 1973, Chant, became a huge hit when re-released in 1994, peaking at #3 on the U.S. album charts.

== List of houses ==
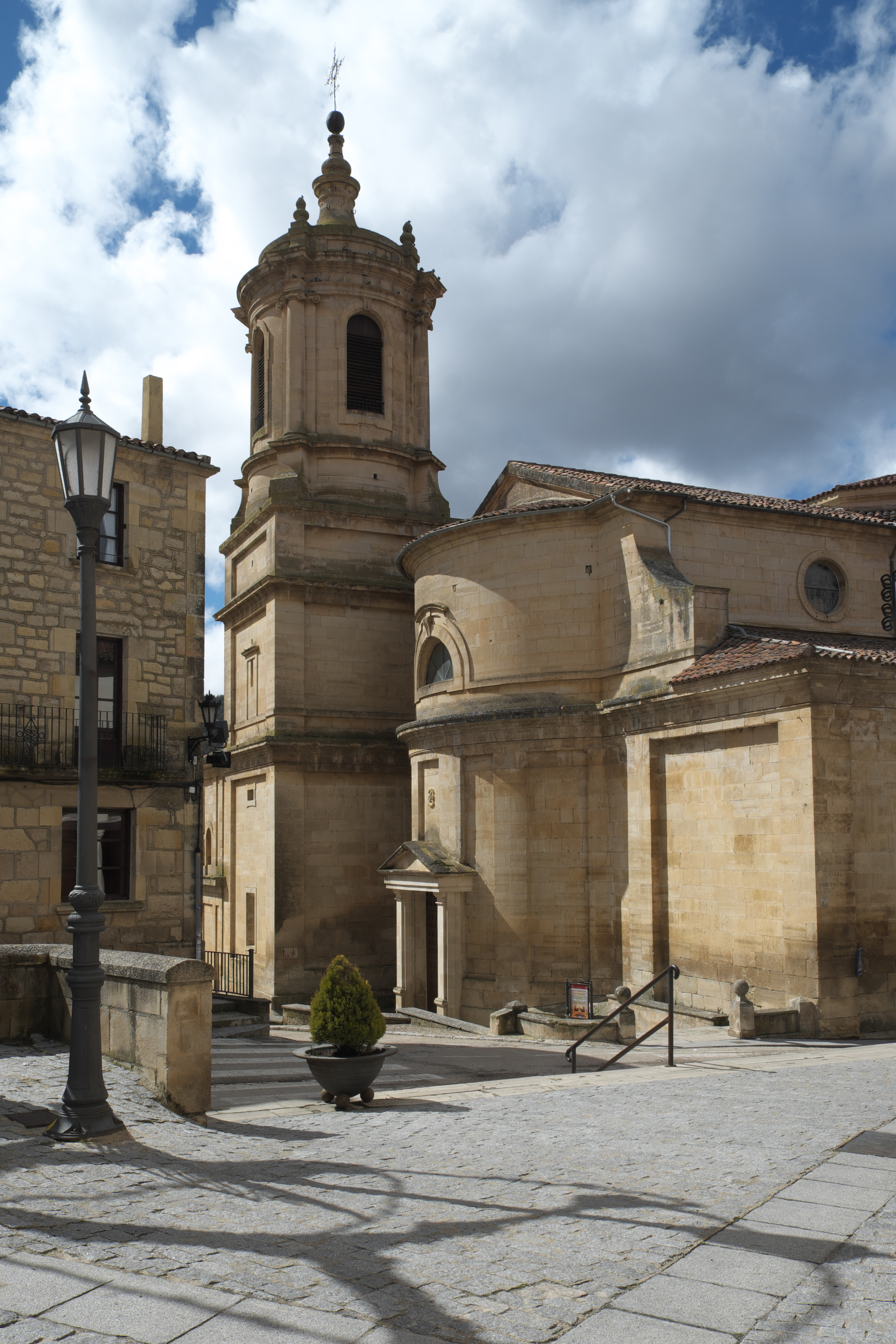
Santo Domingo de Silos Monasterio

(with dates of establishment within the congregation)

=== Monks ===
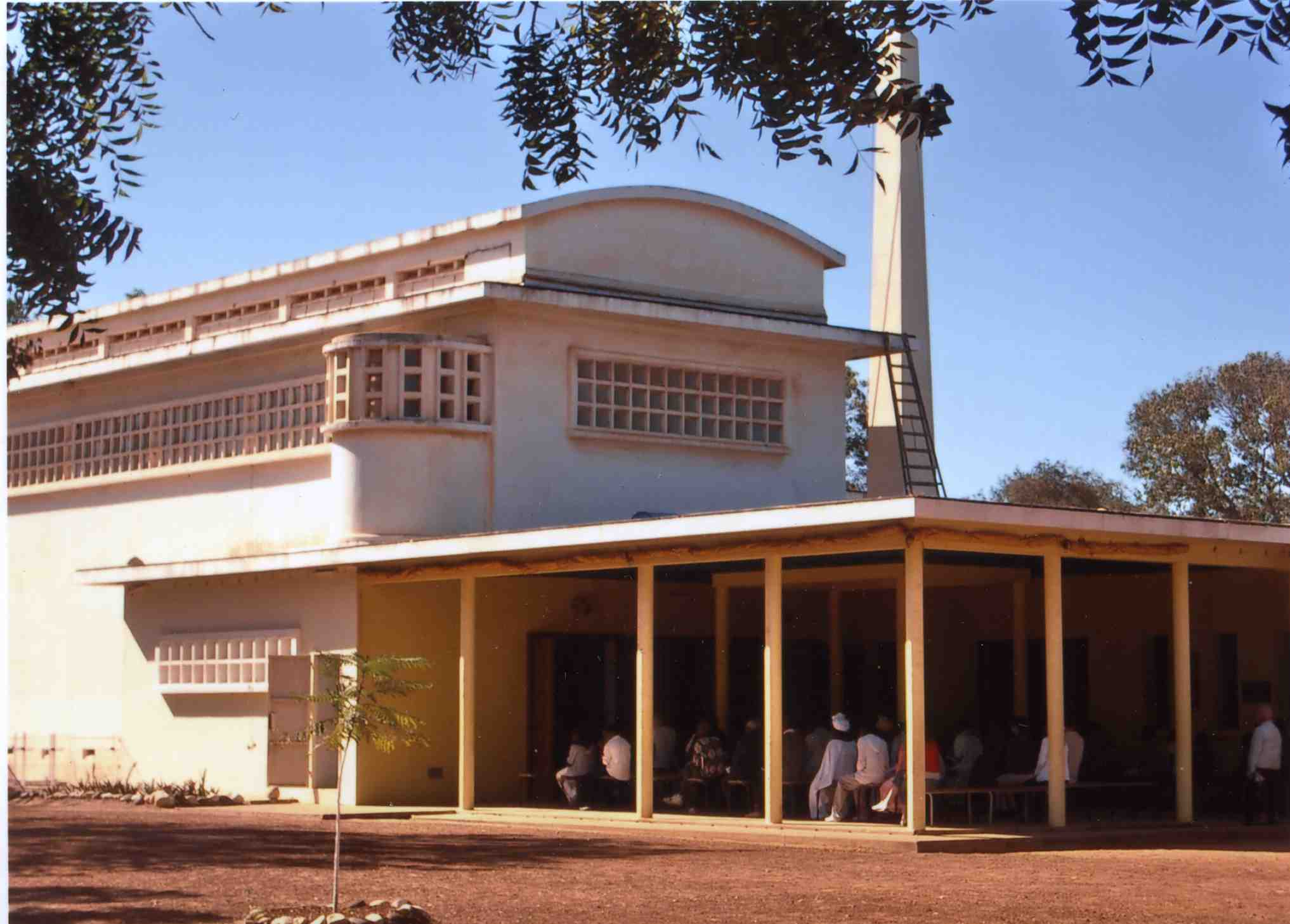
Keur Moussa Abbey, near Thiès, Senegal.

- Solesmes Abbey, France, 1833
- Ligugé Abbey, France, 1853
- Marseilles Priory, now Ganagobie Abbey, France, 1856
- Santo Domingo de Silos Abbey, Spain, 1880
- Wisques Abbey, France, 1889
- Sainte-Marie Abbey, Paris, France, 1893
- St. Wandrille's Abbey, France, 1894
- Clervaux Abbey, Luxembourg, 1890
- Kergonan Abbey, France, 1897
- St Benoît du Lac Abbey, Quebec, Canada, 1912
- Quarr Abbey, England, 1922
- Montserrat Priory, Madrid, Spain, 1939
- Schoelcher Priory, Martinique, 1947
- Fontgombault Abbey, France, 1948
- St. Benedictusberg Abbey, Netherlands, 1951
- Leyre Abbey, Spain, 1954
- Valle de los Caidos Abbey, Spain, 1958
- Keur-Moussa Abbey, Senegal, 1961
- Randol Abbey, France, 1971
- Triors Abbey, France, 1984
- Gaussan Abbey, France, 1994
- Palendriai Priory, Lithuania, 1998
- Clear Creek Abbey, Oklahoma, United States, 1999

=== Nuns ===
- St. Cecilia's Abbey, Solesmes 1866
- Wisques Abbey, 1889
- St. Michael's Abbey, Kergonan, 1898
- Ste Marthe sur le Lac Abbey, Quebec, Canada, 1936
- St Cecilia's Abbey, Ryde, England, 1950
- Keur-Guilaye Priory, Senegal, 1970
- Le Carbet Priory, Martinique, 1977
- Immaculate Heart of Mary Abbey, Vermont, United States, 1981

== Sources ==
- Solesmes Congregation (website of Solesmes Abbey)
