= St. Cecilia's Abbey, Solesmes =

Abbey in Sarthe, France

Coordinates: 47°50′53″N 0°18′21″W

St. Cecilia's Abbey, Solesmes (Abbaye Sainte-Cécile de Solesmes) is a Benedictine convent, founded in 1866 by Dom Prosper Guéranger, the restorer of Benedictine life in France after the destruction of the revolution. It is located in Solesmes, Sarthe, and is the women's counterpart of Solesmes Abbey.

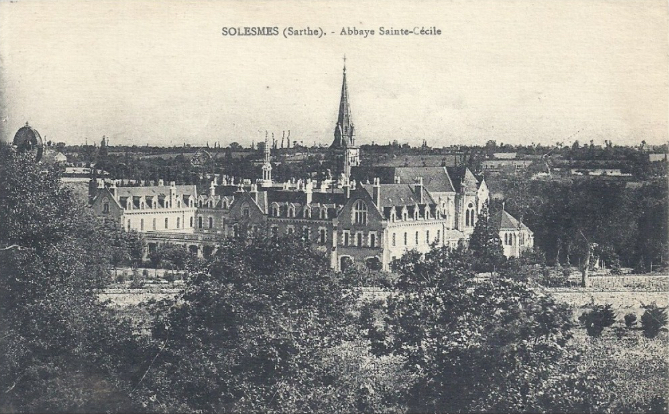
Abbaye Sainte-Cécile de Solesmes

This convent, Dom Prosper's last foundation, was the first religious house for women founded in the Congrégation française de l'ordre de saint Benoît, now the Solesmes Congregation.

== History ==
Unlike men's monasteries, which were completely extinguished after the French Revolution, a number of Benedictine convents were re-established in France during the first decades of the 19th century, combining the life of a Benedictine community with educational functions. There was therefore not the same need for Prosper Guéranger to create a female branch of his new French Benedictine congregation, the Congrégation française de l'ordre de saint Benoît, in the same way as he had revived men's Benedictine houses. The impetus for the foundation of St. Cecilia's in fact came from Dom Guéranger's chance contact with Jenny Bruyère, a girl whom he was asked to teach in preparation for her first communion. As their spiritual relationship developed she gradually revealed her wish to devote her life entirely to God within the spirituality of Solesmes and the Rule of Saint Benedict.

The convent was quickly built, and was dedicated to Saint Cecilia (Sainte Cécile) because of Dom Guéranger's particular devotion to that saint. The foundress, Jenny Bruyère, also took her religious name from the saint, to become Mother Cécile Bruyère, first abbess of St. Cecilia's Abbey, Solesmes.

The 19th century abbey church contains a full-size replica of the monumental effigy of Saint Cecilia in St. Cecilia's Basilica in Rome.

The French anti-religious laws of the early 20th century forced the whole community into exile in England, to the forerunner of the present St Cecilia's Abbey, Ryde, on the Isle of Wight, where on 18 March 1909 Mother Cécile died. When the community was at last able to return to Solesmes, in 1921, her body was also transported and re-buried there.

In 1967, the abbey founded a priory at Keur Guilaye in Senegal.

== Spiritual life ==
Unlike many women's religious houses of the time, the spiritual practice of St. Cecilia's Abbey centered from the beginning on its foundation on the liturgy and on Gregorian chant rather than on the then customary usual methods of prayer. The dynamism of this monastic renewal and the influence of the foundress enabled the women's branch of the Solesmes Congregation to found numerous other daughter-houses, many of them still in existence, in France and in other countries.

The abbey's influence extends beyond its own Congregation, as the constitutions written by Mother Cécile Bruyère, with the support of Dom Guéranger, for her nuns have had an effect on many other Benedictine houses.

== Sources ==
- Solesmes Abbey website: Foundation of St. Cecilia's Abbey (in French)
- Diocese of Le Mans website: St. Cecilia's Abbey (in French)
