= Prosper Guéranger =

French Benedictine abbot (1805–1875)

Servant of God Prosper Guéranger OSB
- Abbot of Solesmes Abbey
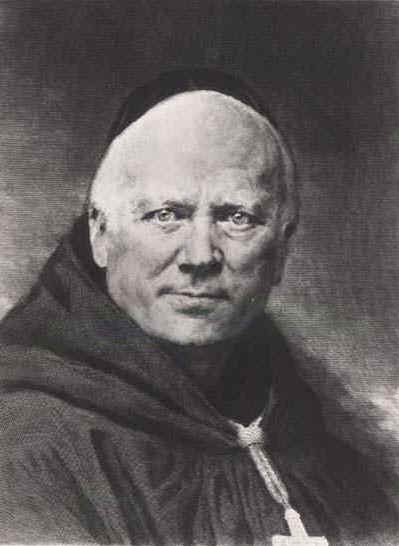
- A painting of Guéranger by Claude-Ferdinand Gaillard (1874)
- Appointed: 14 July 1837
- Term ended: 30 January 1875
- Successor: Louis-Charles Couturier, OSB

Orders
- Ordination: 7 October 1827

Personal details
- Born: 4 April 1805 Sablé-sur-Sarthe, Sarthe, France
- Died: 30 January 1875 (aged 69) Solesmes, Sarthe, France
- Denomination: Roman Catholic
- Coat of arms

Prosper Louis Pascal Guéranger, OSB (pronounced [pʁɔspe ɡeʁɑ̃ʒe]; 4 April 1805 – 30 January 1875) was a French Benedictine priest who served for nearly 40 years as Abbot of Solesmes, where he founded the abbey among the ruins of a former priory. Through the new Abbey of Solesmes, he became the founder of the French Benedictine Congregation, which re-established Benedictine monastic life in France after it had been wiped out by the French Revolution.

Guéranger was the author of The Liturgical Year, a popular commentary which covers every day of the Catholic Church's liturgical year in 15 volumes. He was well regarded by Pope Pius IX and was a proponent of the dogmas of the Immaculate Conception and of papal infallibility. Guéranger is also credited with promoting the adoption of the liturgical books of the Roman Rite throughout France, an important element in the Liturgical Movement, which led to further development of aspects of the Mass of the Roman Rite beyond the form practised in his day. The cause for his beatification was opened in 2005, which has accorded him the title of a Servant of God.

== Life ==
Guéranger was born in Sablé-sur-Sarthe on 4 April 1805 into a working-class family. As a young boy, he frequently read The Genius of Christianity, a work written by François-René de Chateaubriand which defended the Catholic faith against the claims of the Enlightenment, and which had been published shortly before his birth.

As a teenager, Guéranger felt called to serve as a Catholic priest and in 1822 entered the minor seminary at Tours. During this time, he read and embraced the ultramontanist views then held by Hugues Felicité Robert de Lamennais. He also came to study the writings of the Desert Fathers and began to develop a strong interest in the history of the Church and of monastic life.

Ordained a diocesan priest on 7 October 1827, Guéranger was quickly named a canon, a member of the cathedral chapter of Tours. During this period, he was appointed to serve as the administrator of the parish of the Foreign Missions until near the close of 1830. At this point he demonstrated his interest in the liturgy when he began to use the Roman Missal and texts for the Divine Office, unlike many of his colleagues, who still made use of the diocesan editions commonly in use in pre-Revolutionary France.

Guéranger then left Tours and moved to Le Mans, where he began to publish various historical works on the liturgy, such as De la prière pour le Roi (October 1830) and De l'élection et de la nomination des évêques (1831), their subject being inspired by the political and religious situation of the day. Denouncing what he saw as anti-liturgical tendencies in the French Church of his day, his writings drew the praise of the clergy but also the opposition of a vocal faction among the French bishops.

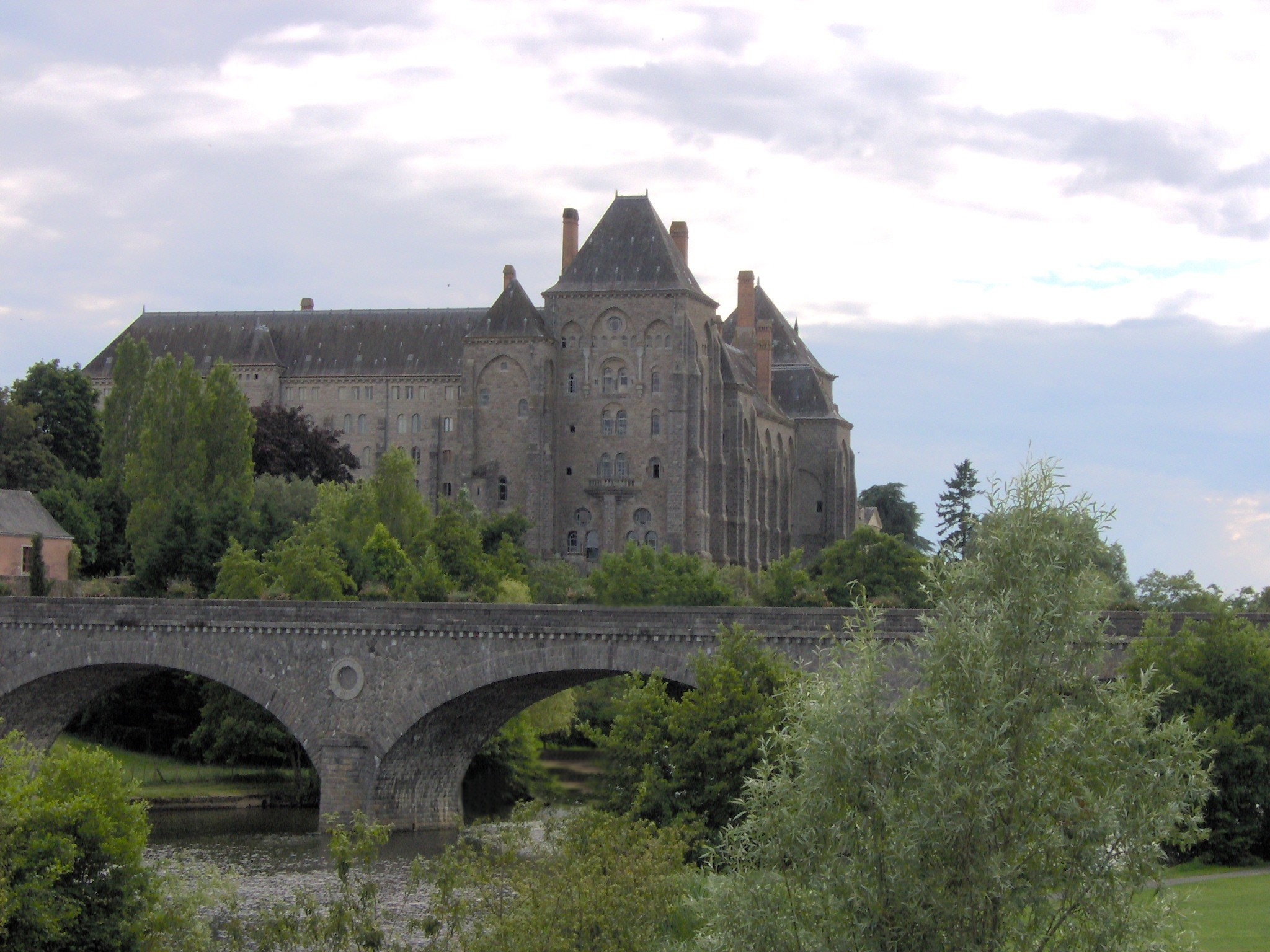
Solesmes abbey

In 1831 the derelict Priory of Solesmes, which was about an hour's journey from Sablé, was put up for sale and Guéranger now saw a means of realizing his desire to re-establish, in this monastery, monastic life under the Rule of St. Benedict. His decision was made in June 1831, and in December 1832, thanks to private donations, the monastery became his property. The Bishop of Le Mans now sanctioned the Constitutions by which the new society was to be organized and fitted subsequently to enter the Benedictine Order.

On 11 July 1833, five priests came together in the restored priory at Solesmes, and on 15 August 1836 publicly declared their intention of consecrating their lives to the re-establishment of the Order of St. Benedict. In a brief issued on 1 September 1837, Pope Gregory XVI, himself a Benedictine, raised the rank of the former Priory of Solesmes to that of an abbey, and constituted it the head of the French Congregation of the Order of St. Benedict. Guéranger was appointed the Abbot of Solesmes (on 31 October) and Superior General of the congregation. Those members of the little community he had formed who had received the monastic habit on 15 August 1836, made their solemn profession under the direction of the new abbot, who had pronounced his own vows at Rome on 26 July 1837.

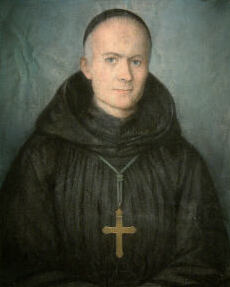
Guéranger in 1840

From then on, Guéranger's life was given up to developing the young monastic community, to procuring for it the necessary material and resources, and to inspiring it with an absolute devotion to the Church and the Pope. Amongst those who came to Solesmes, either to follow the monastic life or to seek self-improvement by means of retreats, Guéranger found many collaborators and valuable steadfast friends. Pitra, afterwards Cardinal, renewed the great literary traditions of the Benedictines of the seventeenth and eighteenth centuries; Bishops Pie of Poitiers and Berthaud of Tulle, Jean-Baptiste Henri Lacordaire, Charles Forbes René de Montalembert and Louis Veuillot, were all interested in the abbot's projects and even shared his labours.

The controversy occasioned by several of Guéranger's writings had the effect of drawing his attention to secondary questions and turning it away from the great enterprises of ecclesiastical science, in which he always manifested a lively concern. The result was a work in which polemics figured prominently, and which now evokes only mediocre interest, and Guéranger's historical and liturgical pursuits suffered in consequence. He devoted himself too largely to personal impressions and neglected detailed and persevering investigation. His quickness of perception and his classical training permitted him to enjoy and to set forth, treat in an interesting way, historical and liturgical subjects which, by nature, were somewhat unattractive. Genuine enthusiasm, a lively imagination, and a style tinged with romanticism have sometimes led him, as he himself realized, to express himself and to judge too vigorously.

Guéranger wished to re-establish more respectful and more filial relations between France and the Holy See, and his entire life was spent in endeavouring to effect a closer union between the two. With this end in view he set himself to combat, wherever he thought he found its traces, the separatist spirit that had, of old, allied itself with Gallicanism and Jansenism. With a strategic skill which deserves special recognition, Dom Guéranger worked on the principle that to suppress what is wrong, the thing must be replaced, and he laboured hard to supplant everywhere whatever reflected the opinion he was fighting. He successfully fought to have the Roman liturgy substituted for the diocesan liturgies. On philosophical ground, he struggled with unwavering hope against Naturalism and Liberalism, which he considered a fatal impediment to the constitution of an unreservedly Christian society. He helped, in a measure, to prepare men's minds for the definition of the papal infallibility, a dogma which reversed the struggle against papal authority fought a century previously by many Gallican and Josephite bishops. On both the occasion of the definition of the Immaculate Conception (1854) and on that of Papal Infallibility (1870), Guéranger contributed written works that served to uphold the Holy See in making these ex cathedra pronouncements.

In 1841 Guéranger began to publish a mystical work by which he hoped to arouse the faithful from their spiritual torpor and to supplant what he deemed the lifeless or erroneous literature that had been produced by the French spiritual writers of the 17th and 18th centuries. L'Année liturgique, of which the author was not to finish the long series of fifteen volumes, is probably the one of all his works that best fulfilled the purpose he had in view. Accommodating himself to the development of the liturgical periods of the year, the author laboured to familiarize the faithful with the official prayer of the Catholic Church by lavishly introducing fragments of the Eastern and Western liturgies, with interpretations and commentaries.

Amid his many labours, Guéranger had the satisfaction of witnessing the spreading of the restored Benedictine Order. Two unsuccessful attempts at foundations in Paris and the former Acey Abbey did not deter him from new efforts in the same line, and, thanks to his zealous perseverance, monasteries were established at Ligugé and Marseille. Moreover, in his last years, he oversaw, in collaboration with the first abbess, Cécile Bruyère, the establishment of a community of women under the Rule of St. Benedict at St. Cecilia's Abbey, Solesmes. This life, fraught with so many trials and filled with such great achievements, drew to a peaceful close at Solesmes.

== Cause for beatification ==
The cause for Servant of God Guéranger's beatification was opened by the Holy See in 2005.

== Sources ==
- FAITH Magazine online: Dom Gueranger, Prophet of Ecclesial Renewal
- Dom Prosper Guéranger Biography on Catholicism.org

Attribution
