= Solesmes Abbey =

Abbey in Sarthe, France

Coordinates: 47°51′8″N 0°18′11″W

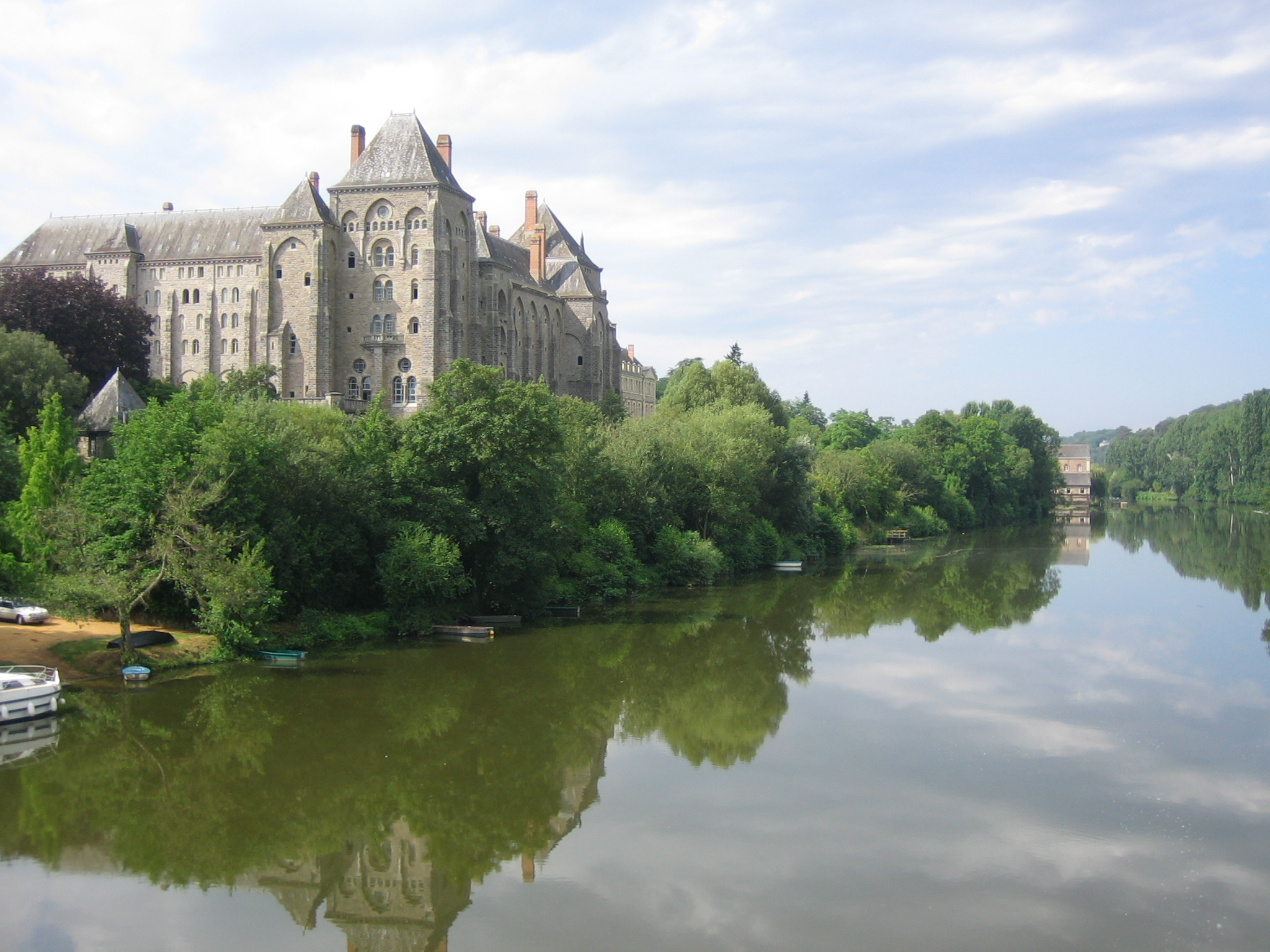
Solesmes Abbey

Solesmes Abbey or St. Peter's Abbey, Solesmes (French: Abbaye Saint-Pierre de Solesmes) is a Benedictine monastery in Solesmes, Sarthe, France, and the source of the restoration of Benedictine monastic life in the country under Dom Prosper Guéranger after the French Revolution. The current abbot is the Right Reverend Dom Abbot Geoffrey Kemlin, O.S.B., elected in 2022.

== Parish ==
Prior to the foundation of Solesmes Abbey, a parish existed at the site. This parish may have been founded at the site as early as the 5th century. Evidence also suggests that the site may first have been built upon in the 6th or 7th century. This original parish was surrounded by a large cemetery. Sarcophagi found at the site suggest that they may go back to the Merovingian period. These sites are still preserved to this day.

== Priory ==
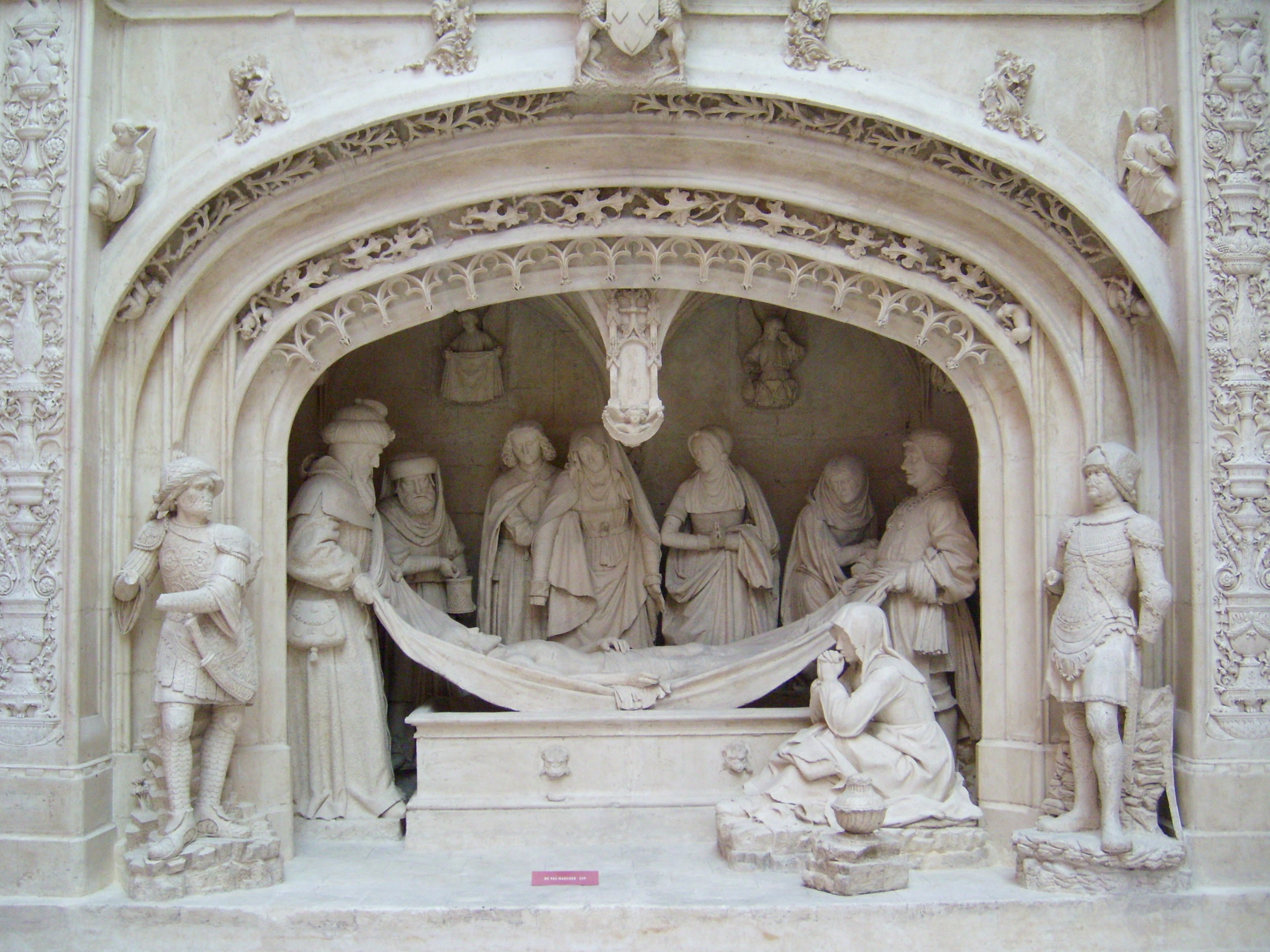
Mise au tombeau du Christ, Solesmes

Solesmes Abbey was founded in 1010 by Geoffrey, Lord of Sablé, who donated the monastery and its farm to the Benedictine monks of the Saint-Pierre de la Couture Abbey, "for the redemption of his soul and those of his parents, or those who went before him and those who come after him". The church was dedicated on 12 October, sometime between 1006 and 1015.

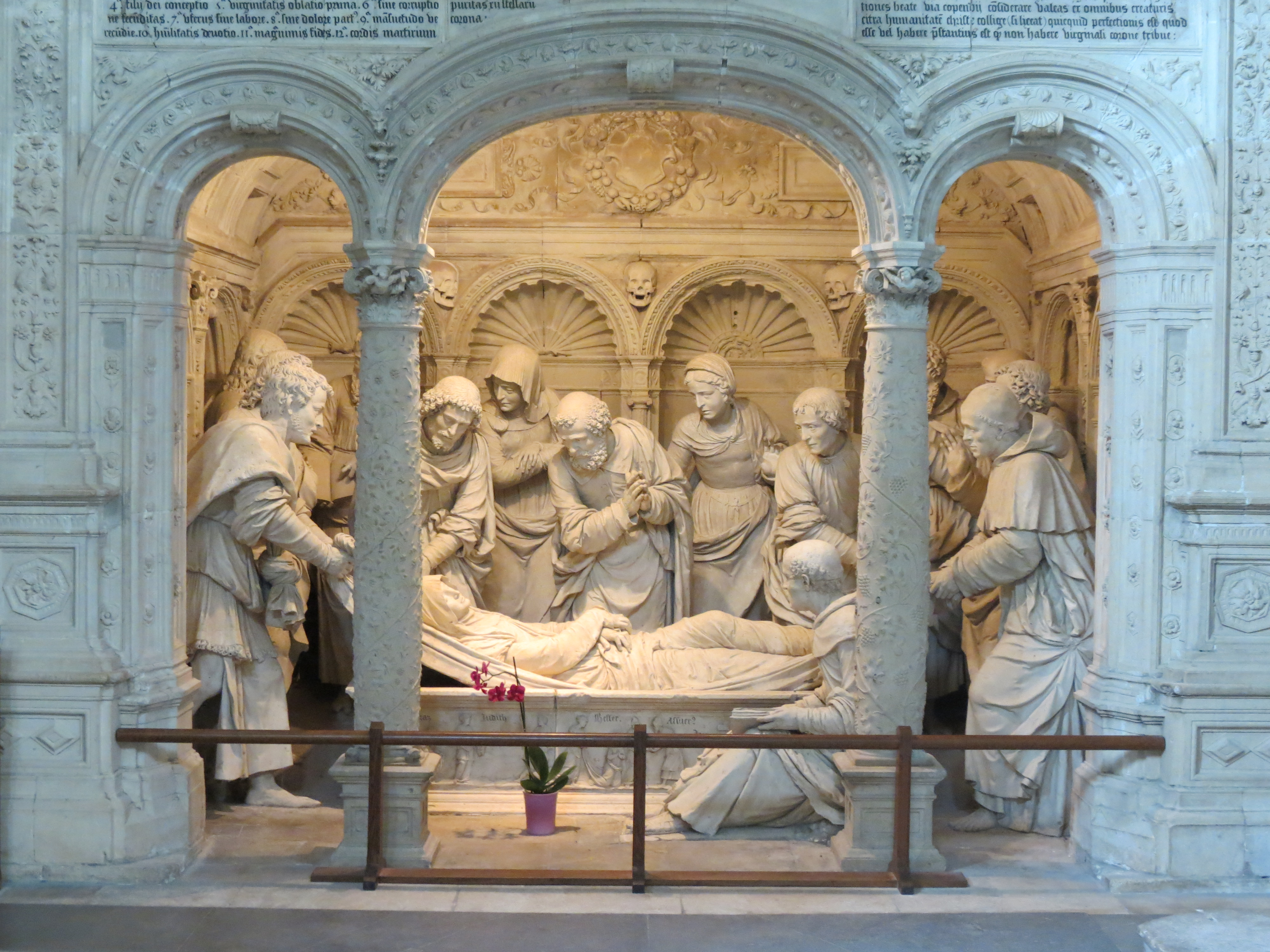
Dormition de la Vierge, Solesmes

In the 12th century, a lord of Sablé returned from the Holy Land in possession of a relic. This relic, being a piece from the crown of thorns was given to the brothers at Solesmes for safekeeping and veneration and drew crowds. The relic is depicted in the center of the monastery's coat of arms.

Solesmes was sacked and burned during the Hundred Years' War but was later restored. The rebuilding of the church started towards the end of the 15th century. Prior Philibert de la Croix changed its plan from the basilica form to a Latin cross. His successor, Jean Bougler (1505–1556), completed the restoration of the church, added the tower, and rebuilt the cloisters, sacristy, and library. Under his direction two groups of statuary, known as the "Saints of Solesmes", were set up in the church. In the 16th century these masterpieces were in danger of being destroyed by the Huguenots and other iconoclasts, but the monks saved them by erecting barricades.

From the 17th century on, Solesmes Abbey underwent a slow decline under a series of commendatory abbots. Such superiors, designated in commendam, received part of the monastery's income without living there; they were sometimes laymen with no authority over internal discipline, while in commendam clerics had very limited authority. However, in 1664, the monastery was aggregated to the Congregation of Saint Maur (the Maurists) and a stricter monastic observance was resumed.

Following the French Revolution, the newly formed National Constituent Assembly prohibited all religious vows on 13 February 1790. At Solesmes one of the seven monks (the sub-prior) broke his vows to become a constitutional priest and soldier of the Republic. At the beginning of 1791, the monks began to leave the monastery, and those who resisted were imprisoned or deported to the Island of Jersey. One of them, Dom Pierre Papion, hid in order to celebrate secret masses across the region. After signing the Concordat of 1801, he became chaplain of the hospice de Sablé. Solesmes, whose occupants had been forced out in March 1791, was then commandeered as the country residence of a certain Henri Lenoir Chantelou and its archives were burned in a "civic" bonfire on 14 July 1794. The church was reopened at the time of the Concordat and the Lenoir de Chantelou family were given statues by Napoleon himself so that those at Mans were not removed.

In 1825, government property administrators sold the monastic buildings and 145 acres with its farms.

== Abbey ==
Solesmes abbey

In 1831 the remaining buildings, which had escaped demolition in the Revolution but were threatened with destruction for want of a buyer, came to the attention of a locally born priest, Prosper Guéranger. Inspired by a vision of a restored monastic life in France, he acquired them for the home of a new Benedictine community. In 1832, it was decided to demolish the buildings, starting with the east wing, which has now disappeared. The Benedictines moved in on 11 July 1833. The new community flourished and in 1837 not only received Papal approval but was elevated to the rank of an abbey and was to become the mother house of an extensive French Benedictine Congregation, now the Solesmes Congregation. This later became a founding member of the Benedictine Confederation.

In 1866 a convent, St. Cecilia's Abbey, Solesmes, was also founded at Solesmes, by Mother Cécile Bruyère (the first abbess) with the support of Dom Guéranger, which was the first house of the nuns of the Solesmes Congregation.

Since its restoration Solesmes has been dissolved by the French Government no fewer than four times. In 1880, 1882, and 1883 the monks were ejected by force but, receiving hospitality in the neighbourhood, succeeded each time in re-entering their abbey. Between 1901 and 1922 the monks were forced into exile in England. They settled on the Isle of Wight and built the present Quarr Abbey. The community survived those trials and those of two World Wars and is still at Solesmes.

As part of its mission of monastic revival the abbey has been the mother house of some twenty five other monastic foundations, including the monastery at Palendriai in Lithuania.

The abbey is noted for its contribution to the advancement of the Roman Catholic liturgy and the revival of Gregorian chant. A documentary film on life at Solesmes was made in 2009 and focuses on the tradition of the chant at the monastery.

The Abbey celebrated a Jubilee Year from 11 October 2010 to 12 October 2010.

== Architecture ==
=== Church ===
The Abbey Church at Solesmes dates back to the 11th century. The church is long, narrow, and composed of two sections: the Nave and the Monk's Choir. The Nave was built between the 11th and 15th centuries and the Monk's Choir was built by Dom Prosper Guéranger in 1865. In the nave, a large stained glass window had to be blocked to install a great organ, which now sits in the back of the nave.

Originally, there were two aisles in the church, but these were destroyed during the Hundred Years' War. A statue of Saint Peter can be found on the right side of the nave. This statue was created in the 15th century and displays Saint Peter wearing pontifical vestments, a papal tiara, and holding two large keys. These keys commemorate Saint Peter as the apostle to whom Jesus gave the "Keys of Heaven".

Within the monks' choir section, there are choir stalls that are for use by the brothers at Solesmes. The Abbey church has sixty-four choir stalls and was built in 1865. However, twenty-four of these stalls date back to the second half of the 16th century. These older stalls were originally located in the nave of the church. On the stalls, icons of Jesus' lineage are depicted. These icons begin with Jesse, the father of David. The lineage is continued until reaching the Virgin Mary carrying the child Jesus.

=== Gardens ===
Solesmes currently holds two well-manicured gardens. The smaller of the two, being the guesthouse terrace gardens surrounds a small house coated in coarse pink plaster. This area, as well as the adjacent slope (informally referred to as "the valley" by members of the congregation) is accessible by retreaters for meditation and reflection. The larger of the two gardens is located within the enclosure. The enclosure is defined by the brothers at Solesmes as:

The area delimited by a wall that includes the monastery buildings and adjoining garden and is reserved for monks. Enclosure helps devote us to searching for God alone by separating us from the hustle and bustle of the outside world.

This area, while generally restricted to members of the congregation at Solesmes, may be visited by guests, with permission. However, such visitors are asked to respect its peace and silence.

=== Saints ===
Located within the transept of the church are "The Saints of Solesmes." These artistic masterpieces, whose creators have been lost to time, are displayed on both the North and South sections of the transept. Their estimated construction period was from c. 1530 – c. 1553 (being the date inscribed on the South colonnade). It is unknown who sculpted these icons, as nearly all of the monastery's archives were destroyed during the French Revolution. In addition, any records of who financed the creation of the Saints of Solesmes was lost with the destruction of the monastery's archives as well. It can be inferred the Saints of Solesmes were donated by wealthy benefactors, as the priory's finances at this time period would not have been able to finance a project of this magnitude.

== Religious life ==
With the Rule of Saint Benedict being followed within the monastery, life was, and still is, one of rigid obedience. With the Rule being established around 530 A.D., the monastery has always been tied to the Order of Saint Benedict. In the year 1084, the French Bishop Hugh of Grenoble established the monastic Carthusians at Chartreuse. However, the Solesmes monastery did not change or sway from its role as a focal point of the Rule of Saint Benedict in France.

Solesmes, being a Benedictine monastery, follows a two-part model of prayer. Opus Dei consists of the Work of God, being Psalms that are recited in common (together with one another) and Lectio Divina being a reflective period of reading Scripture and embracing God's word as a centre to religious life.

At Solesmes, as in any other monastery that abides by the Rule of Saint Benedict, physical labor is an integral part of Benedictine Life. This manual labor is such that it maintains and supports the religious community as a whole.

St. Benedict makes this clear when he says: "veri monachi sunt si labore manuum suarum vivunt sicut et patres nostri et apostoli" or "they are true monks if they live by the labor of their own hands just as our fathers and the apostles [did]." Thus monks must do various kinds of manual labor necessary to support the community. ... Manual labor has the benefit of physically sustaining the community, making the monastic life possible.

— Freeman (2013), Daily Life in Medieval Spirituality pp.12, 81–82; quotation from:, The Rule of St Benedict, Ch 48

Throughout the history of Solesmes, importance has been given to the practice and use of Gregorian chant. Solesmes was one of many monasteries to utilize this form of chant. A concerted effort was made to reform the corrupted variants of the chant in 1899. These traditions are still preserved to this day.

== Solesmes today ==
Monastic Offices at Solesmes are available to the general public. The Abbey Church at Solesmes is open to the public for worship from 9:00 am (9:30 am on Sundays and Feast Days) to 6:15 pm. The monastery again opens for Compline. Exhibitions on the abbey, which includes an exhibition on monastic life led by one of the Brothers is available from 9:00 am to 7:00 pm daily, excluding Officium Divinum times. Access to the monastery's shop is also available at this time.

Solesmes hosts spiritual retreats for men, women, and for large mixed-sex groups. The Rule of Saint Benedict states, "All guests who present themselves are to be welcomed as Christ" (Rule of St Benedict, Ch. 53). The monastery has guesthouses within the monastic enclosure available for men. However, women who wish to participate in a retreat may not reside on the monastery grounds. There are small houses operated by the monastery located in Solesmes village, which is very near the abbey available for rent. There are recommended amounts to donate to the monastery for these accommodations, both for men staying inside the monastery, and for women and families staying in the houses in Solesmes village.

== Modern Abbots ==
Including Guéranger, there have been seven abbots of Solesmes since its refoundation:

1. Prosper Guéranger, 1837 - 1875
2. Louis-Charles Couturier, 1875 - 1890
3. Paul Delatte, 1890 - 1921
4. Germain Cozien, 1921 - 1959
5. Jean Prou, 1959 - 1992
6. Philippe Dupont, 1992 - 2022
7. Geoffroy Kemlin, 2022 - present

== See also ==
- St. Cecilia's Abbey, Solesmes
