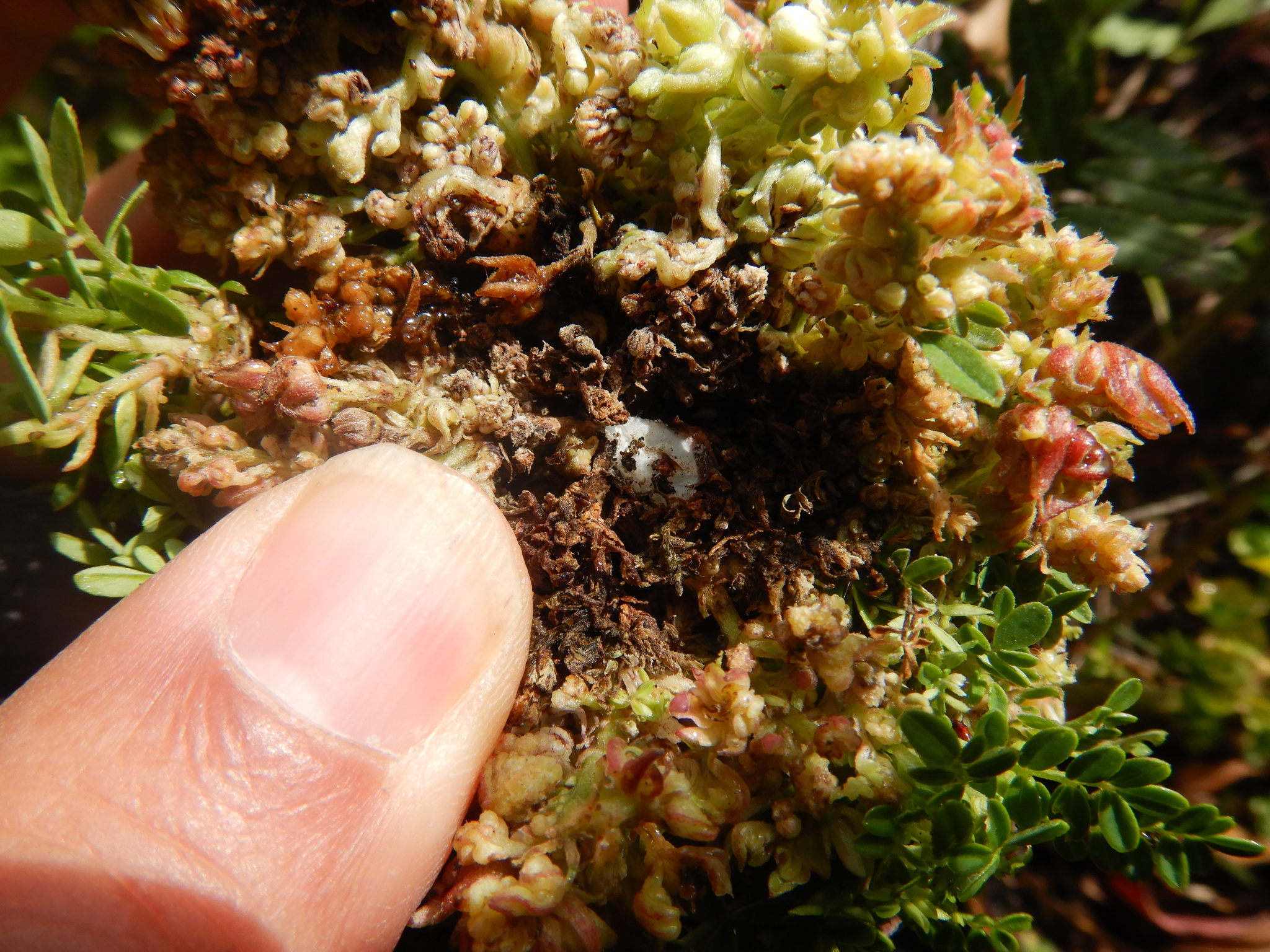
- Witch's broom on a Clianthus plant caused by Aceria clianthi

Scientific classification
- Kingdom: Animalia
- Phylum: Arthropoda
- Subphylum: Chelicerata
- Class: Arachnida
- Family: Eriophyidae
- Genus: Aceria
- Species: A. clianthi

Binomial name
- Aceria clianthi Lamb, 1952

= Aceria clianthi =

Species of mite

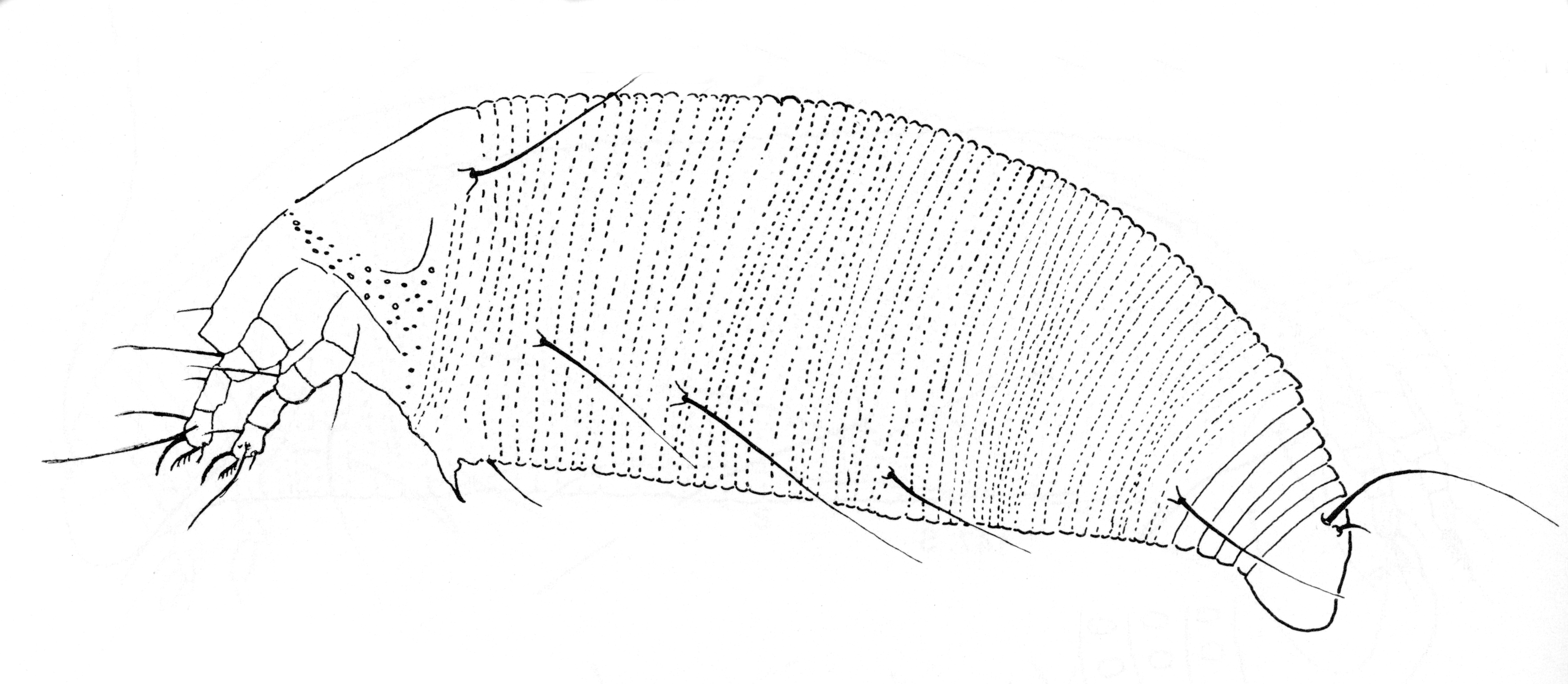
Illustration of Aceria Clianthi

Aceria clianthi is a species of mite belonging to the family Eriophyidae. It is found only in New Zealand. It is notable for being host specific to threatened plants of the genus Clianthus. It is classified by Buckley et al. as "nationally critical" under the New Zealand Threat Classification System. They stated "Aceria clianthi (Eriophyidae), has been recorded only from kakabeak (Clianthus spp.) in cultivation and once on Lotus cornalatus [Lotus corniculatus] (Fabaceae), an introduced plant growing near kakabeak (Martin 2009). It is given the same threat classification as kakabeak (de Lange et al. 2009)." Heenan had earlier stated that "the two species [of Clianthus] are considered to be threatened, with C. maximus having a rank of vulnerable, whereas C. puniceus is critically endangered", but the conservation status of C. maximus was subsequently found to be more serious. These threat classifications for Clianthus apply to plants in the wild, but the species are widely cultivated. Aceria clianthi occurs on both plants in the wild and in cultivation.
