= Apley (disambiguation) =

Apley is a hamlet and civil parish in the West Lindsey district of Lincolnshire, England.

Apley may also refer to:

- Apley Castle, a medieval fortified manor in the village of Hadley, Shropshire, England
- Apley Forge, a village in Shropshire, England
- Apley Hall, an English Gothic Revival house located in Stockton, Shropshire
- Alan Graham Apley (1914-1996), British orthopaedic surgeon and educator
  - Apley grind test, used to evaluate individuals for problems in the meniscus of the knee, devised by Alan Graham Apley

== See also ==
- Appley (disambiguation)
- The Late George Apley, a 1937 novel by John Phillips Marquand
- The Late George Apley (film), a 1947 American film based on the novel
