= Appley =

Appley may refer to the following places in the United Kingdom:

- Appley, a hamlet in the civil parish of Stawley in Somerset
- Appley, Isle of Wight, an area of Ryde
- Appley Bridge, a village in West Lancashire, England
- Appley House, Isle of Wight
- Appley Towers, Isle of Wight

== See also ==
- Apley (disambiguation)
