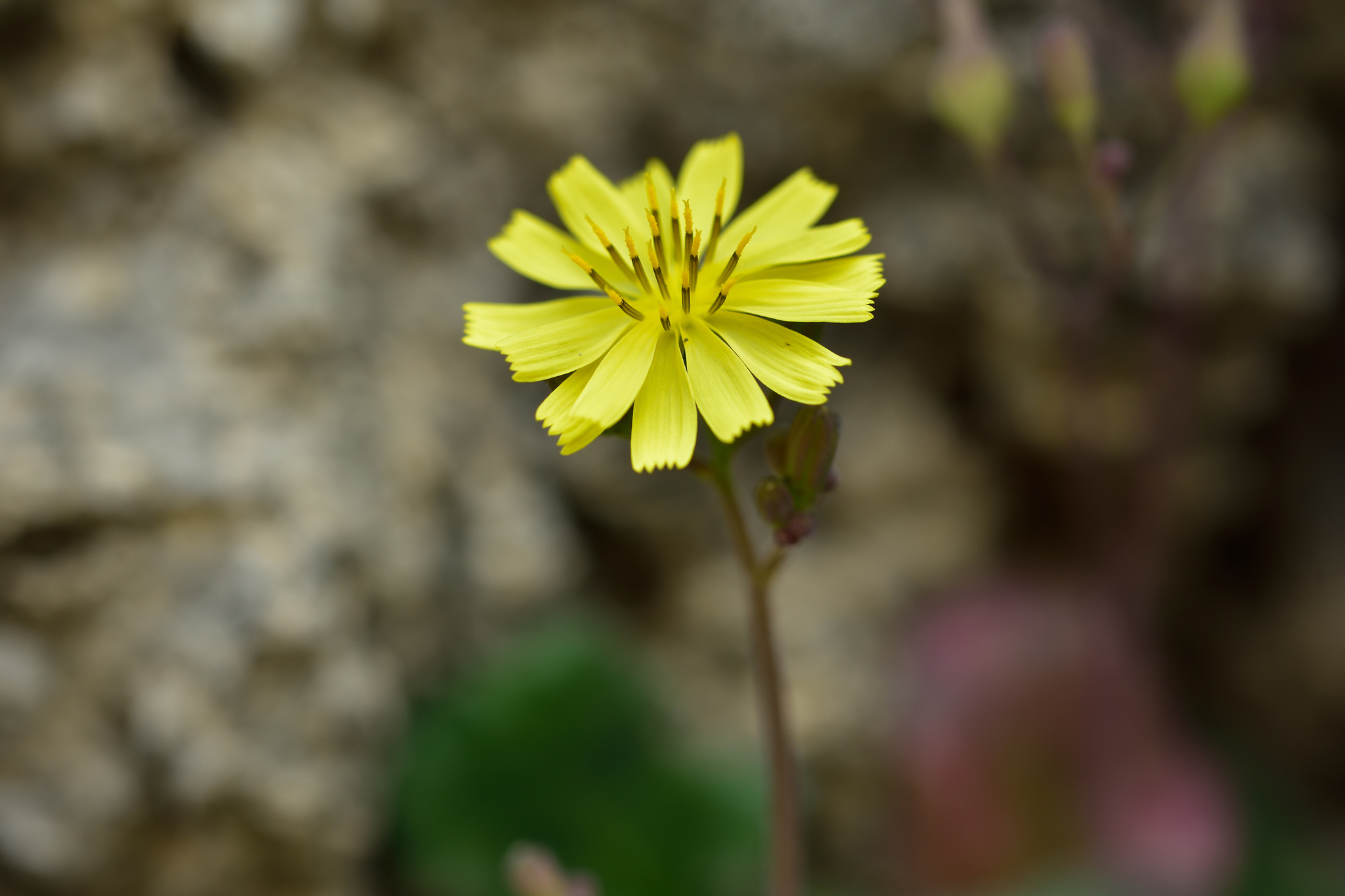

Scientific classification
- Kingdom: Plantae
- Clade: Tracheophytes
- Clade: Angiosperms
- Clade: Eudicots
- Clade: Asterids
- Order: Asterales
- Family: Asteraceae
- Genus: Youngia
- Species: Y. japonica
- Subspecies: Y. j. subsp. formosana

Trinomial name
- Youngia japonica subsp. formosana (Hayata) Kitam.

Synonyms
- Crepis formosana Hayata

= Youngia japonica subsp. formosana =

Taiwanese plants

Youngia japonica subsp. formosana is an endemic subspecies of Youngia japonica in Taiwan. It is often confused with another endemic subspecies of Youngia, Y. japonica subsp. monticola. Collection records of this species dated back to 1906, but its taxonomy rank was not clarified until 2012. It is now known that this species is distributed primarily in the western coastline of Kaohsiung’s Shou-shan Mountain, Chihou Mountain and Liuqiu Island of Pingtung. The species normally grows on coastal coral-reef limestone rocks, and is morphologically distinctive from other subspecies by having a smaller plant, thicker and velvet-like textured leaves, and reddish-brown colored achene. The 2017 Red List of Vascular Plants in Taiwan evaluated the threat level of this species as “Least Concern” (LC).

== Morphological features ==
Rosette-shaped small herb with a plant height about 7 cm. The leaves are linear spoon-shaped or slightly koto-shaped, about 7 cm long and 2 cm wide, with obvious petiole; the lower surface of the leaf is densely covered with thick and short hairs with velvet-like texture; the tip of the leaf is generally round and blunt, and the leaf margin is koto-shaped and pinnatifid, with pinna lobes closer to the blade tip becoming larger in size. The margins of the pinna lobes are irregularly serrated, and the leading edge of the serrations often has a short convex tip. Inflorescence head colored in yellow, composed only of ray flowers, raceme grow on the axis of the inflorescence. The ripe achenes are reddish-brown colored, spindle-shaped to ovoid shape, about 2.3 mm long and 0.7 mm wide, slightly curved and flattened as a whole; multiple longitudinal ridges visible on the surface, truncated or blunt at the bottom, and condensed at the apex. Beak-shaped, and terminal white pappus about 2 mm.

== Distribution and habitats ==
Endemic to Taiwan, locally distributed in the western coastline of Kaohsiung's Shou-shan Mountain, Chihou Mountain and Liuqiu Island of Pingtung. Normally grows on coastal coral-reef limestone rocks, the environment often experiences strong year-long sun exposure.

== Taxonomy ==
=== Early taxonomy ===
This species was originally published as a new species by Bunzo Hayata in 1911, citing the original specimens collected by Takiya Kawakami and Genji Nakahara from Takao (present-day Kaohsiung) in 1906 (the holotype specimen is currently archived at the herbarium of the University of Tokyo). At that time, the specimen was classified in the genus Crepis with the scientific name Crepis formosana, and was described to be morphologically similar to Crepis japonica (now known as Y. japonica japonica, synonym). However, the leaves of this species contain unique velvety texture (source; near C. japonica Benth., from which the present plant differs in having velvety leaves.) The scientific nomenclature was either downgraded to infraspecific taxon in 1933, 1936, 1937 and 1938, or re-classified as Youngia When the 2nd Edition of Flora of Taiwan was published in 1998, the Chief Editors of Asteraceae - Ching-I Peng, Hug-Fang Chung, Hui-Lin Li - adopted the taxonomical viewpoint of Shirou Kitamura in 1937, and treated this species as an endemic subspecies in Taiwan, using the scientific nomenclature of Y. japonica subsp. formosana, and described this species to be commonly distributed in the mountainous areas of altitudes 1500 to 2500 meters. Notably, the description of this species’ geographical distribution in the 2nd Edition of Flora of Taiwan was clearly different from those described by Bunzo Hayata, therefore botanists in Taiwan have for some time considered the Y. japonica subsp. formosana to be an endemic subspecies that is mainly distributed in the mid-altitude mountainous regions of Taiwan.。

=== Rediscovery and further taxonomy ===
Around 2010 or earlier, while on a survey trip in the western coast of Kaohsiung’s Shoushan Mountain, Prof. Yueh-Fong Chen et al. of Providence University discovered morphologically distinctive Youngia plants growing on the coral-reef rocks, seemingly never been officially described before. Later, the research team of Academia Sinica’s Professor Ching-I Peng collected specimens to study, and subsequently completed the molecular phylogenetic analysis of all Youngia plants in Taiwan in 2012, confirming the then-unknown Youngia to be closely related to Y. japonica, possibly a subspecies. The divergence event of the nominated subspecies may trace back to late Pleistocene or even later. The team of Prof. Peng re-examined all holotype specimens of Youngia plants in Taiwan, and discovered that the Y. japonica subsp. formosana (Hayata) Kitam described in the 2nd Edition of Flora of Taiwan is not the same plant as the Crepis formosana Hayata, published by Bunzo Hayata in 1911. The former is an endemic plant from the mid-altitude mountainous regions of Taiwan, with larger plant and smooth leaf textures, while the latter is limited to coastal coral-reef of Southern Taiwan, with smaller plants and velvety leaves. Based the priority principles of naming convention, the name Y. japonica subsp. formosana (Hayata) Kitam. is reserved for the latter plant as described by Hayata in 1911, and the former is renamed to Youngia monticola (Y. japonica subsp. monticola K. Nakam. & C.-I Peng).
