= Appley Towers =

Country house in Ryde, Isle of Wight, UK

Appley Tower
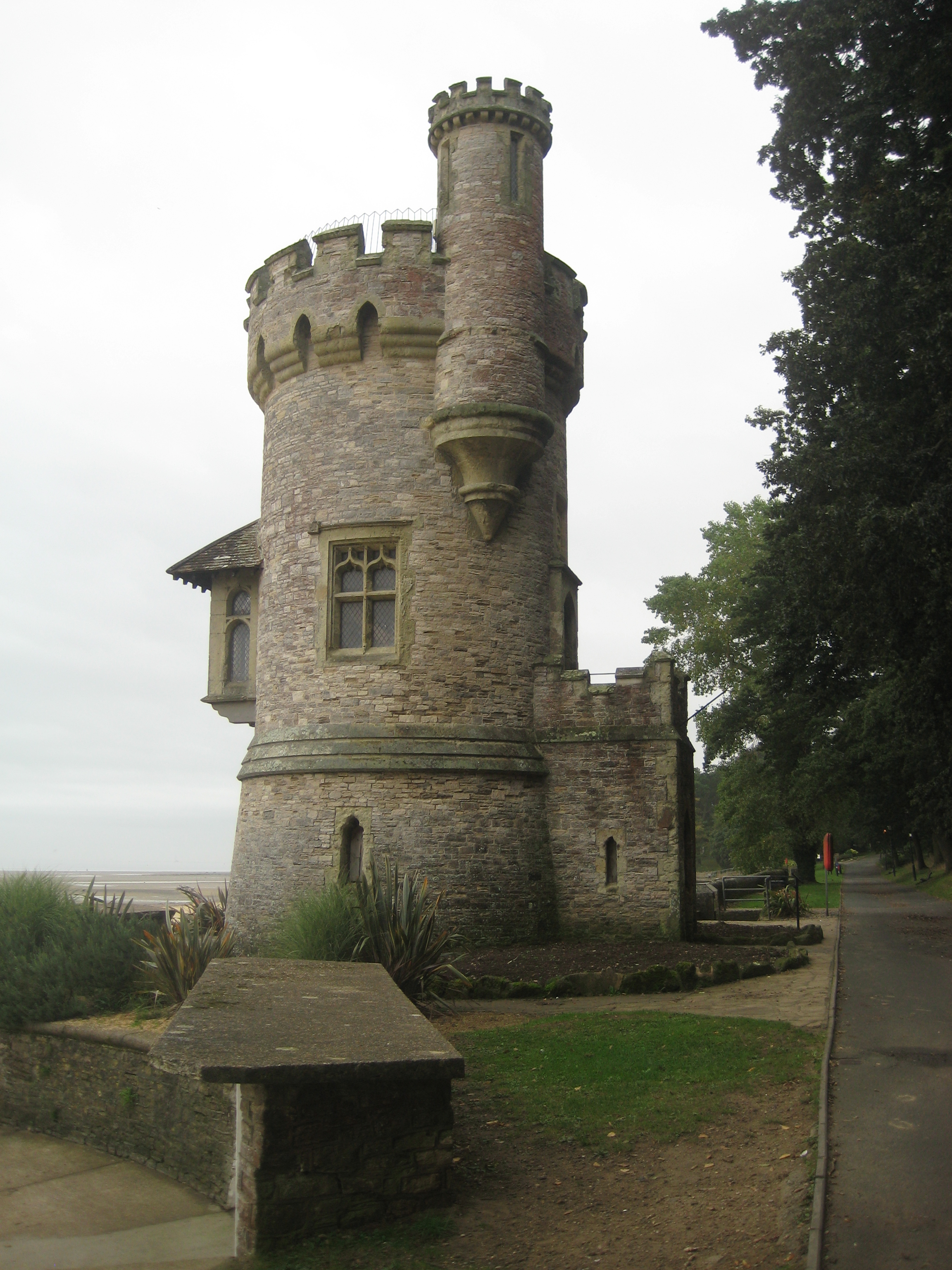

- Location within Isle of Wight

General information
- Architectural style: Tudor Revival, Gothic Revival
- Location: Ryde, Isle of Wight, England
- Coordinates: 50°43′26″N 1°08′38″W

Design and construction
- Architect: Thomas Hellyer (tower folly)
- Main contractor: Isaac Barton (tower folly)

Appley Towers, also at various times called Apley Towers or Appley Towers House was an English country house near Appley House in Appley, Isle of Wight. It was the home of the Hutt family, who bought it in the 1870s, and later of Sir Hedworth Williamson. The house has been demolished, but a number of its estate buildings survive.

== House ==
The house was on an eminence with views of the sea, protected by a sea wall. It was Tudor Revival and Gothic Revival in style. There was a clock tower at the east end. After Sir William Hutt bought it in about 1870, he had the house, gardens and estate extensively remodelled.

== Other buildings ==
In about 1875 Hutt had Appley Tower, a folly, built just above the beach in the form of a castle tower. The tower is circular, with battlements, a turret and an external stair. It has Gothic Revival tracery windows, and an oriel window facing the sea. It survives and is a local landmark.

The estate had a farm with stables and a turreted water tower. These buildings also survive, with the stables divided into three bungalows.

Another surviving building is a 19th-century lodge on Appley Road, built in a Jacobethan and Dutch Revival style.

The estate had a conservatory that measured 63 by 23 feet (19.2 m × 7.0 m). Near it was an aviary that housed rare species of parrots. There was also an orangery. The kitchen gardens and forcing houses were on the opposite side of the road.

A pier existed on the estate by the early 1870s. In 1873 it was replaced by a new 100 foot pier. By the end of 1911 the pier had undergone demolition although silting up of that area had rendered it unusable before that point.

== Grounds ==
The grounds, described in 1878 in the Journal of Horticulture, had a collection of trees including Acacias longifolia, armata and concinna, Aralia papyrifera, Araucaria brasiliensis, Breadfruit (Artocarpus incisa), Dracaena indivisa, Erythrina crista-galli, Eucalyptus globulus (from seeds received from Nice and Algiers) and peach-shaped-leafed Eucalyptus.

There were shrubs including Azaleas, Aucubas, Boronia serrulata, Bouvardias, Cantua dependens, Clianthus puniceus and magnifica, Correa × harrisii, Fuchsias, Grevillea rosmarinifolia, Hydrangeas, Nerium oleander and Rhododendrons.

There were ferns including Alsophila excelsa and Dicksonia antarctica.

Other plants included Abutilon "Boule de Neige", Abutilon vexillarium, Cassia corymbosa, Desfontainea spinosa, Dasylirions, Eriostemons, Habrothamnus elegans, Lapagerias, Phormium tenax, Rhynchospermum jasminoides and Youngia medio-picta.

== Sources ==
- Cowan, B (1878). "Appley Towers". Journal of Horticulture and Practical Gardening. 35 (Public domain ed.): 349–.
- Elford, June; Gascoigne, Steve (2004). Isle of Wight Gem of the Solent. Sandown: Coach House Publications. pp. 11–. ISBN 978-1-899392-33-9.
- Jenkinson, Henry Irwin (1876). Jenkinson's practical guide to the Isle of Wight (Public domain ed.). London: Edward Stanford. pp. 10–.
- Lloyd, David Wharton; Pevsner, Nikolaus (2006). The Isle of Wight. Buildings of England (revised ed.). New Haven, CT: Yale University Press. ISBN 978-0-300-10733-3.
