= Lobster claw (disambiguation) =

A lobster claw is one of the two large claws of any marine crustacean in the family Nephropidae.

Such lobster claws are eaten as food.

Certain plants with flowers resembling such claws in color and shape are species of:

- Heliconia, also called toucan beak, wild plantain, or false bird-of-paradise
- Clianthus, also called kaka beak (kōwhai ngutukākā in Māori), parrot's beak, parrot's bill, or glory pea
