= C. maximus =

C. maximus may refer to:

- Cetorhinus maximus, the basking shark, the second largest living shark species
- Clianthus maximus, the "kaka beak", a shrub native to New Zealand

== See also ==
- Maximus (disambiguation)
