= Youngia nilgiriensis =

Scientific classification
- Kingdom: Plantae
- Clade: Tracheophytes
- Clade: Angiosperms
- Clade: Eudicots
- Clade: Asterids
- Order: Asterales
- Family: Asteraceae
- Genus: Youngia
- Species: Y. nilgiriensis

Binomial name
- Youngia nilgiriensis Babc.

Species of flowering plant

Youngia nilgiriensis is an endangered perennial herb. It is endemic to the Sispara area of the Kundah range of the Nilgiri Hills, Tamil Nadu, South India characterised by vast stretches of grasslands interrupted by numerous sholas at an elevation of around 2,060 metres (6,760 ft). It is listed as an endangered species in the Red Data Book on Indian Plants.

The plant is 30–47 centimetres (12–19 in) high. Radical leaves are 10–16 cm (3.9–6.3 in) × 13–30 mm (0.51–1.18 in), oblanceolate, Iyrate-pinnatifid, acute, upper surface puberulous, lower surface glabrous; petiole long; cauline leaves: lower ones similar to radical leaves or acuminate; upper ones sessile, lanceolate, acuminate-caudate.

- Flowers are yellow. Heads are 2–4 together, about 13-flowered.
- Peduncle is 15 mm (0.59 in) long, glabrous. Involucre 8–9 mm (0.31–0.35 in) long, glabrous, dark green.
- Corolla is 9–10 mm (0.35–0.39 in) long; ligule 2 mm broad, dentate, 1.0–1.5 mm long; tube 2 mm long, acuminate.
- Anthers are 2 mm long; appendages 0.25 mm long, acuminate; filament 1 mm long.
- Achenes is 5 mm long, sub-compressed, apex pale and strongly attenuate, base scarcely attenuate, ribs 12–14, unequal, brown.
- Pappus is 5 mm long, 2–3 serrate, ash-grey.
