= Moturemu Island =

Island in New Zealand

Native name: Moturemu
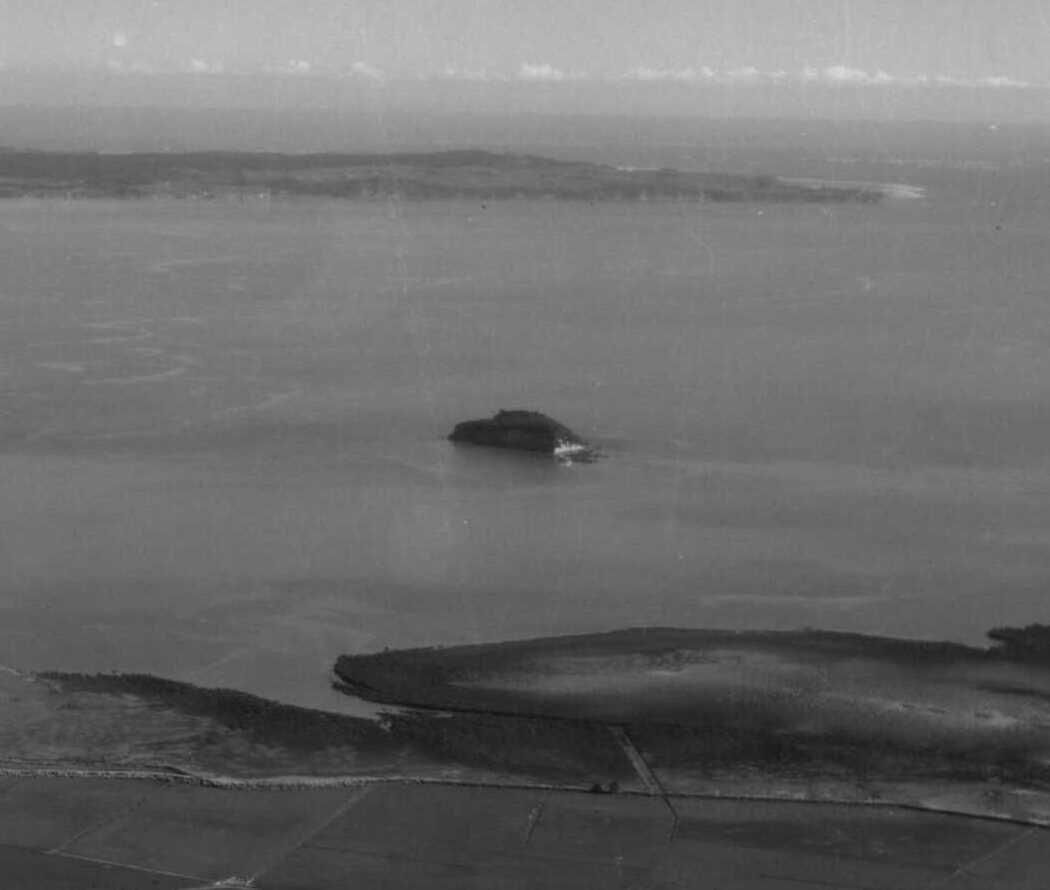
- Aerial view of Moturemu Island in 1980
- Interactive map of Moturemu Island

Geography
- Location: Auckland
- Coordinates: 36.42222°S 174.39333°E
- Adjacent to: Kaipara Harbour
- Area: 54,000 m^{2} (580,000 sq ft)
- Length: 590 m (1940 ft)
- Width: 230 m (750 ft)
- Highest elevation: 46 m (151 ft)

Administration
- New Zealand
- Region: Auckland
- Local government area: Rodney
- Subdivision: Kumeū Subdivision

Moturemu Island is an island located in the Kaipara Harbour in the Auckland Region, New Zealand, southwest of Tauhoa and southeast of the Okahukura Peninsula. The island has a long history of occupation by Tāmaki Māori, and is an important site for Ngāti Whātua o Kaipara, who since 2013 have owned the island.

== Geography ==
Moturemu Island is located in the eastern Kaipara Harbour, west of the mouth of the Hōteo River. The island is covered in scrub and located 2 km (1.2 mi) off Karaka Point. It reaches a height of 46 m (151 ft) above sea level and is approximately 5 ha (12 acres). The Tauhoa River, a tidal channel of the harbour, flows to the northwest of the island, between Moturemu Island and the Okahukura Peninsula. The island is formed from Waitemata Sandstone.

== Biodiversity ==
The island is primarily forested by pōhutukawa and karaka trees. Moturemu Island is the only known location where wild Clianthus puniceus (kōwhai ngutukākā or kakabeak) plants are known to grow.

== History ==
Ngā Iwi (an early Tāmaki Māori group) constructed pā on Moturemu Island. The island was attacked by Kāwharu during Te Raupatu Tīhore (the stripping conquest). The island is an important site for Ngāti Whātua o Kaipara, due to its extensive history of occupation.

In 1880, the island was sold to surveyor and ethnologist Stephenson Percy Smith, who used Moturemu island as a place for camping. In 1886, he gifted the island as wedding present for his daughter-in-law, Rachel Smith. Large fires in the early 20th century replaced much of the vegetation with mānuka scrub, and the island became a nesting site for introduced common starlings. By the 1950s, pōhutukawa trees had begun to emerge through the mānuka scrub.

In 1951, Rachel Smith gifted the island to the New Zealand Government, who created the Moturemu Island Scenic Reserve in 1978. In 2013 as a part of a Waitangi Tribunal settlement, the island was returned to Ngāti Whātua o Kaipara.
