= Apley grind test =

Test assessing the meniscus of the knee

The Apley grind test or Apley test is used to evaluate individuals for problems in the meniscus of the knee. The Apley grind test has a reported sensitivity of 97% and a specificity of 87%.

== Description ==
In order to perform the test, the patient lies prone (face-down) on an examination table and flexes their knee to a ninety degree angle. The examiner then places his or her own knee across the posterior aspect of the patient's thigh. The tibia is then compressed onto the knee joint while being externally rotated. If this maneuver produces pain, this constitutes a "positive Apley test" and damage to the meniscus is likely. Lateral rotation tests for medial implications (meniscal during compression and ligamentous when distracting the tibia) and medial rotation tests for lateral implications again (meniscal during compression and ligamentous when distracting the tibia). Greater than 90 degrees of knee flexion will impinge more of the posterior horn, 90 degrees of knee flexion the medial meniscus and the closer to knee extension the further the anterior horn is being tested (< 90 degrees of knee flexion).

== History and etymology ==
The Apley test is named for Alan Graham Apley (1914–1996), a British orthopedic surgeon.
