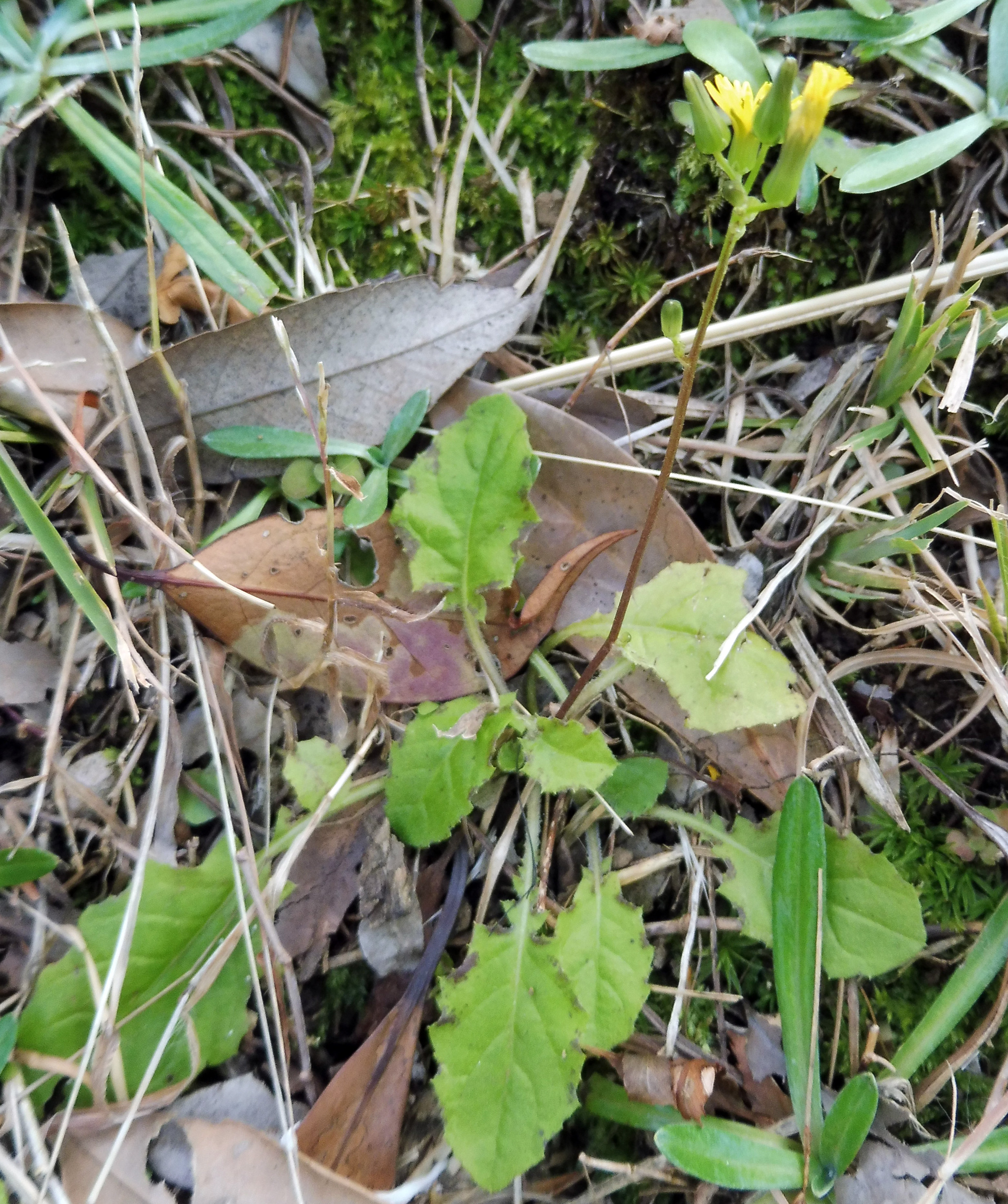
- A small wild specimen of Y. japonica in Japan

Scientific classification
- Kingdom: Plantae
- Clade: Embryophytes
- Clade: Tracheophytes
- Clade: Spermatophytes
- Clade: Angiosperms
- Clade: Eudicots
- Clade: Asterids
- Order: Asterales
- Family: Asteraceae
- Genus: Youngia
- Species: Y. japonica

Binomial name
- Youngia japonica (L.) DC.

= Youngia japonica =

Species of flowering plant

Youngia japonica, commonly called Oriental false hawksbeard, is a species of flowering plant in the family Asteraceae. Native to eastern Asia, it is now found as a weed nearly worldwide.

== Genomics ==
A chromosome-level genome assembly of Youngia japonica was published in 2026. The genome is approximately 1.14 Gb in size, with the assembled sequences anchored onto 8 pseudo-chromosomes. The assembly has a BUSCO completeness of 95.4%, and 35,827 protein-coding genes were predicted.

== Description ==
It is an annual that produces yellow flowers. In tropical areas, it can bloom year round, while in temperate areas it blooms in late spring and early summer. Plants are variable in height, ranging from 10 to 150 cm (4 to 59 in) depending on growing conditions. Stems are usually solitary and erect. Basal leaves are large and pinnately divided. Its fruits are wind dispersed.

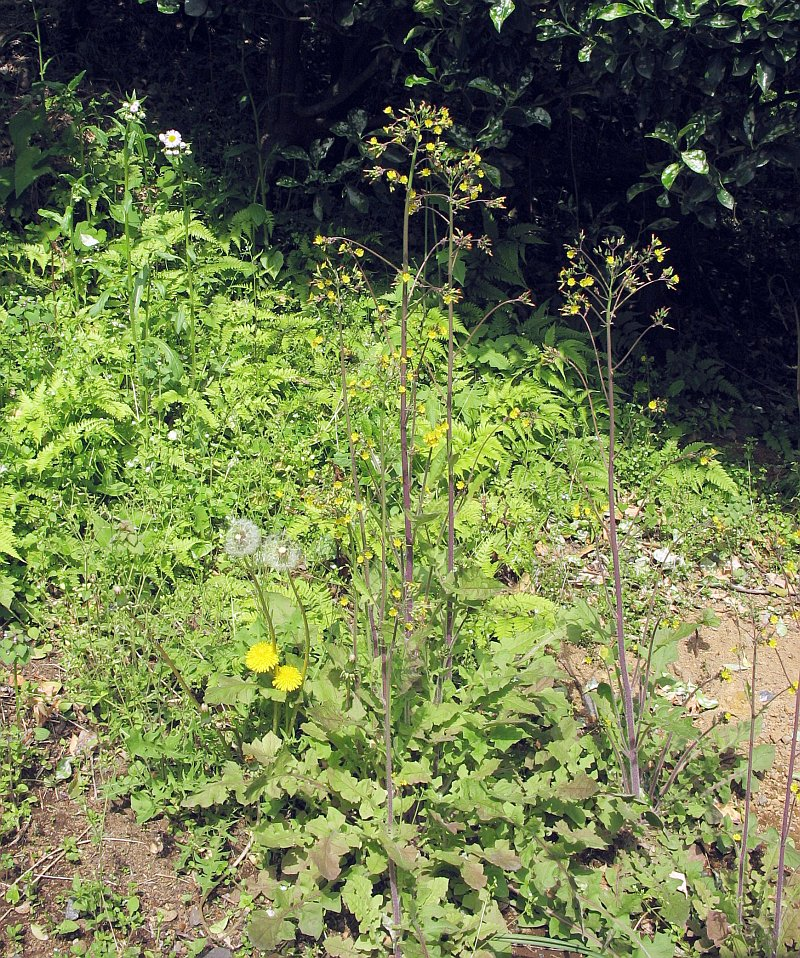
Youngia japonica grows tall under favorable conditions

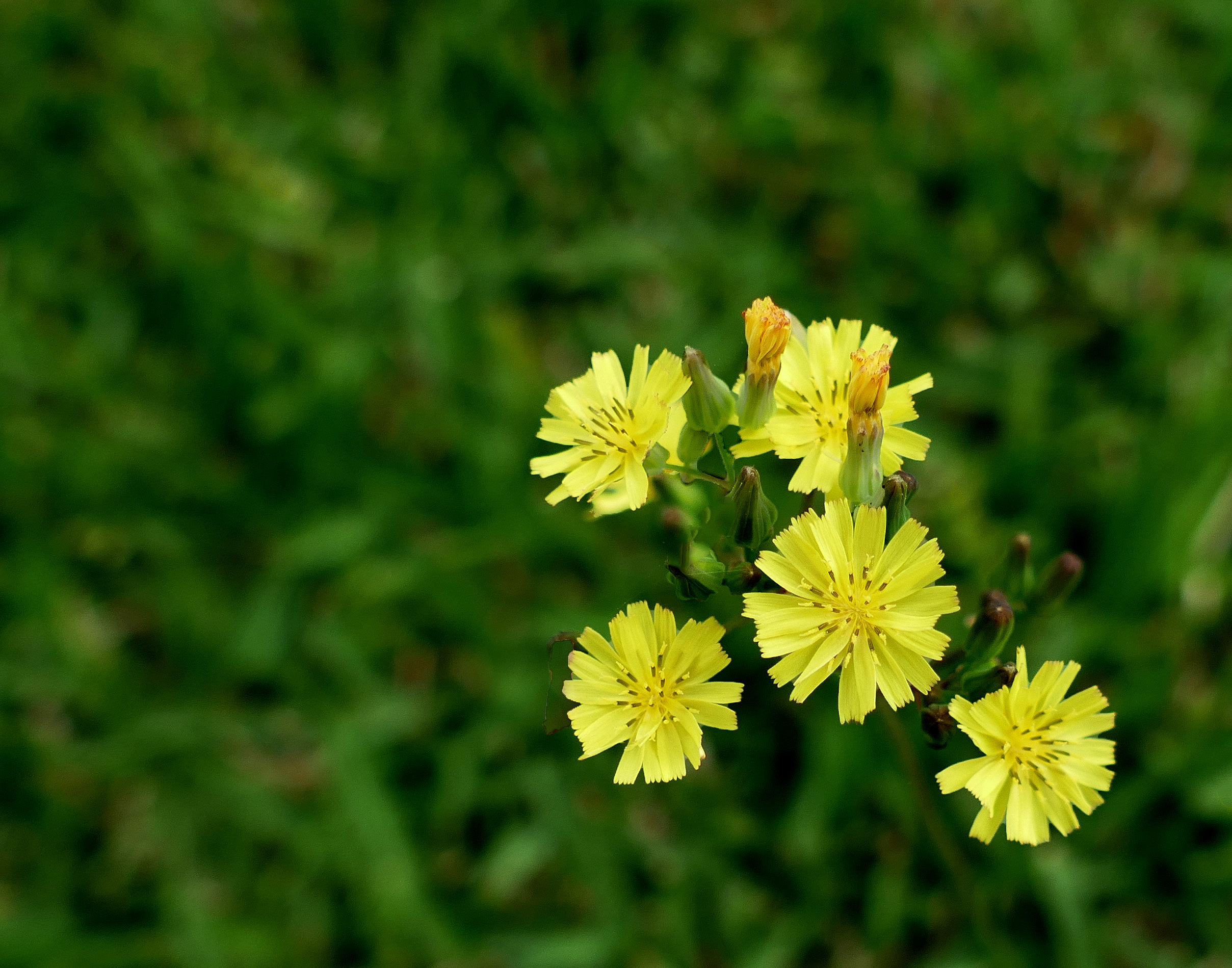
A Youngia japonica in bloom

== Distribution and habitat ==
Youngia japonica is native to eastern Asia in China and Japan. However, it has been spread far from its initial range, and is now found as a non-native species nearly worldwide. It is present in Africa, Australia, Europe, North America, and South America. In the United States, it is spreading rapidly, although it is largely restricted to areas in the Southeast. It grows well in response to human disturbance, and is found in areas such as roadsides, cultivated fields and in lawns. In China, it is found in a variety of natural and disturbed habitats. It is known to penetrate into intact natural communities as an invasive species in the United States.

== Taxonomy ==
Three subspecies are recognized. They are:

- Youngia japonica subsp. elstonii - With many stem leaves. Not known to be weedy.
- Youngia japonica subsp. japonica - With few to no stem leaves. A weed found nearly worldwide.
- Youngia japonica subsp. longiflora - Has larger flowers. Not known to be weedy. This is considered the most distinct subspecies.

It has been reported to form intergeneric hybrids with Lapsanastrum humile in Japan.
