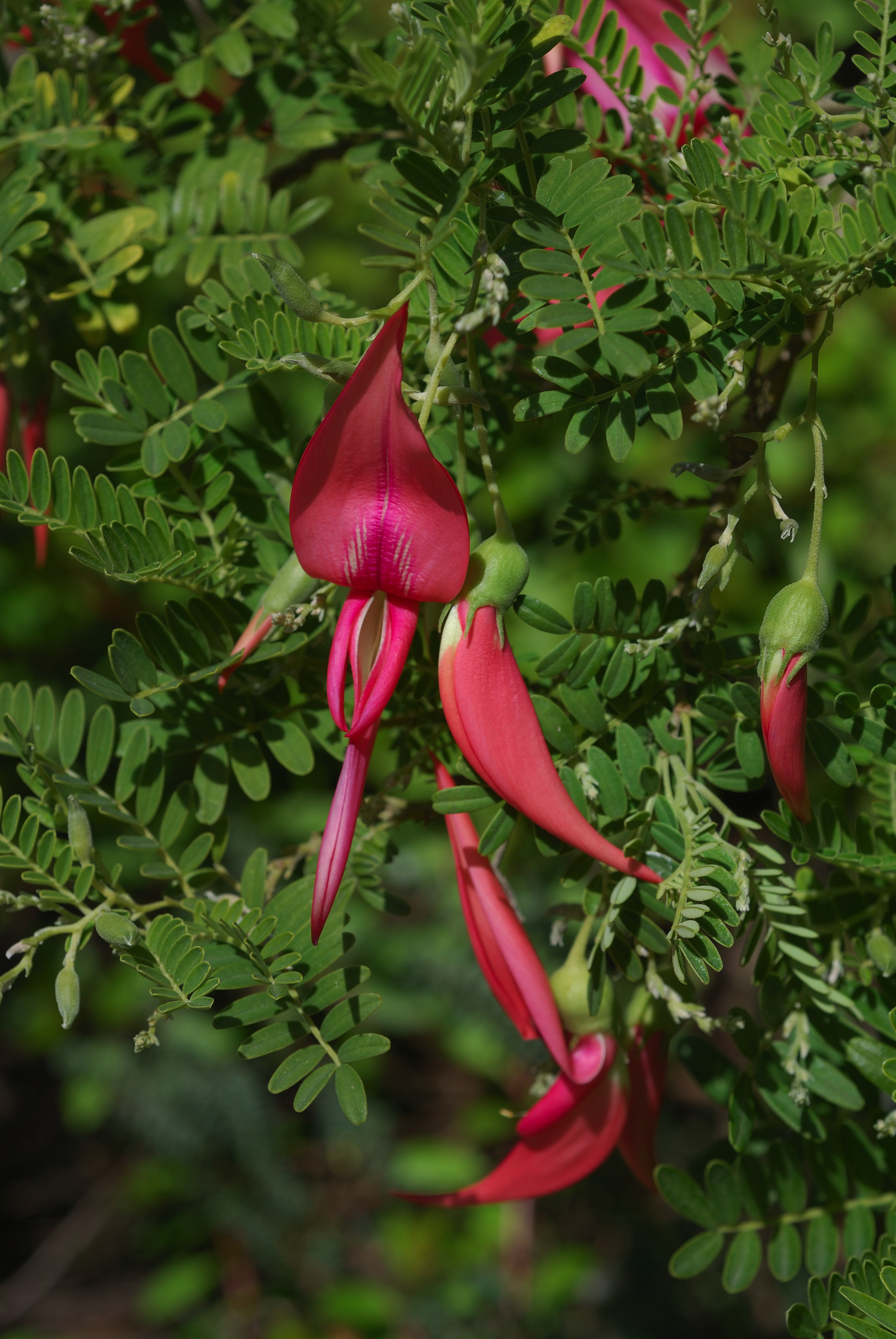
- Kakabeak leaves and flowers

Scientific classification
- Kingdom: Plantae
- Clade: Tracheophytes
- Clade: Angiosperms
- Clade: Eudicots
- Clade: Rosids
- Order: Fabales
- Family: Fabaceae
- Subfamily: Faboideae
- Clade: Inverted repeat-lacking clade
- Tribe: Galegeae
- Subtribe: Astragalinae
- Genus: Clianthus; Sol. ex Lindl. (1834 publ. 1835)

Type species
- Clianthus puniceus (G. Don) Sol. ex Lindl.

Species
- Clianthus magnificus (Van Houtte) C.Dickens (syn. Clianthus maximus Colenso); Clianthus puniceus (G.Don) Sol. ex Lindl.

Synonyms
- Donia G.Don & D.Don (1832), nom. illeg.; Eremocharis R.Br. (1849)

= Clianthus =

Kakabeak

Genus of legumes

Clianthus, commonly known as kaka beak (kōwhai ngutukākā in Māori), is a genus of flowering plants in the legume family Fabaceae, comprising two species of shrubs endemic to the North Island of New Zealand. They have striking clusters of red flowers which resemble the beak of the kākā, a New Zealand parrot. The plants are also known as parrot's beak, parrot's bill and lobster claw – all references to the distinctive flowers. There is also a variety with white to creamy coloured flowers called: "Albus", and a variety with rosy pink flowers called: "Roseus".

== Description and taxonomy ==
Kakabeak grows to around two metres high, with spreading branches producing leaf stalks up to 15 cm long bearing several pairs of small leaflets. They usually flower from spring through to early summer, but can flower twice a year or even year round.

Joseph Banks and Daniel Solander collected specimens of Clianthus in 1769 and C. puniceus was described in 1835. William Colenso identified two species of Clianthus as early as 1847 and described C. maximus in 1885. However Thomas Kirk reduced C. maximus to a variety of C. puniceus in 1899. Peter Heenan reinstated C. maximus as a separate species in 2000.

Clianthus forms a clade with the genus Carmichaelia, New Zealand broom. Together they form a larger clade with the Australian genus Swainsona and the New Zealand Montigena (scree pea). Sturt's desert pea, Swainsona formosa, has some similarities to kakabeak and was initially placed in the genus Clianthus. The fourth genus of New Zealand native legumes is Sophora, represented by eight species of kowhai. The floral emblem of South Australia, Swainsona formosa, formerly Clianthus dampieri, is similar.

== History ==
Clianthus was traditionally cultivated by the Ngāi Tai ki Tāmaki people. The plants were used for nitrogen fixation of the kūmara plantations on Motukaraka Island, and the flowers for elaborate garlands for high-ranking women.

Kakabeak featured on New Zealand's definitive stamps from 1960 to 1969, initially on the pre-decimal 2d stamp, and then on its replacement 2c stamp from 1967.

The two species are the critically endangered Clianthus puniceus which is now known in the wild only on Moturemu Island in the Kaipara Harbour, and the endangered Clianthus maximus. In a 2005 survey, only 153 plants of C. maximus were found (down from over 1000 in 1996), mainly in the East Cape region. C. maximus is widely grown as a garden plant in New Zealand, but the cultivated lines are descended from only a few plants and are not genetically diverse. C. puniceus is cultivated and has given rise to award-winning cultivars.

== Gallery ==
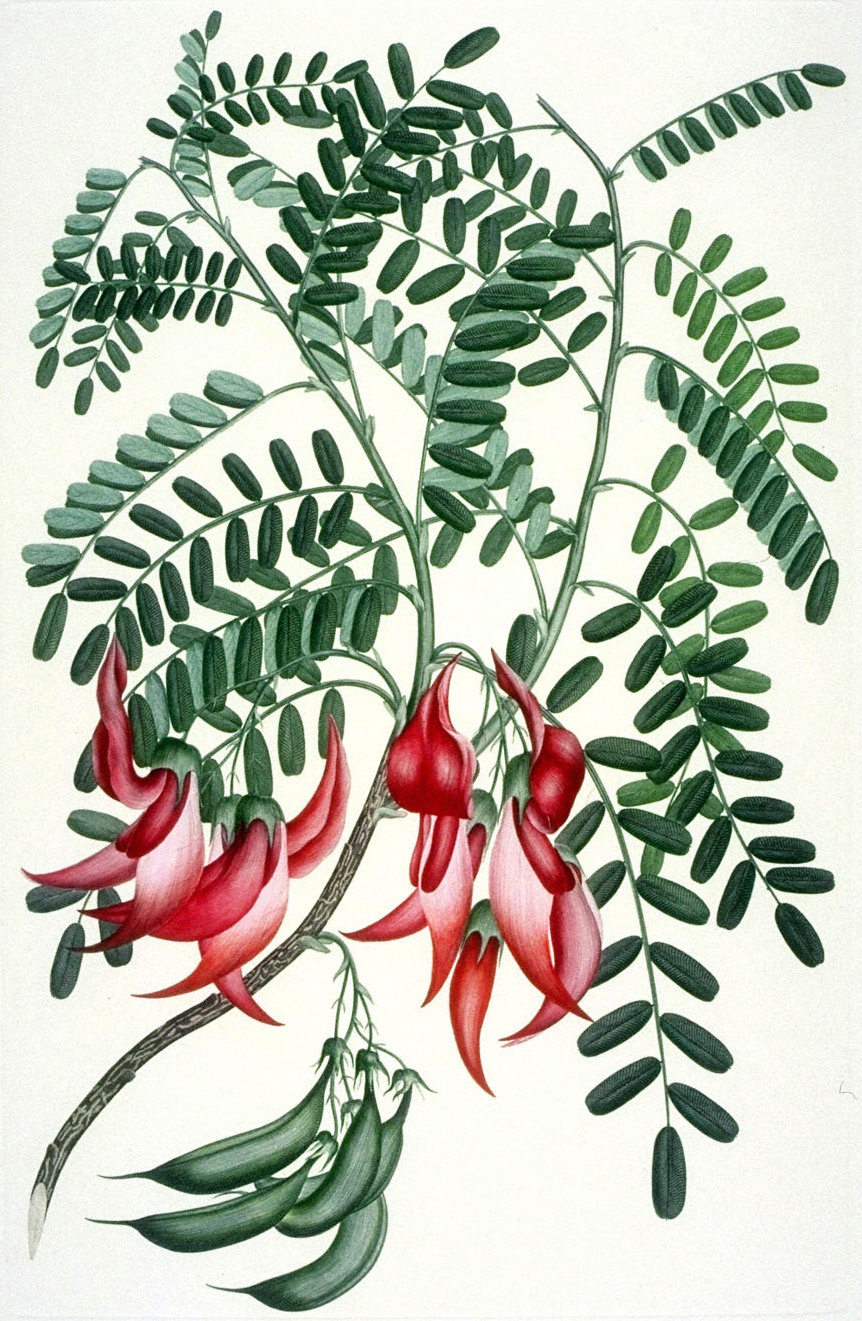
Botanical illustration from Cook's first voyage

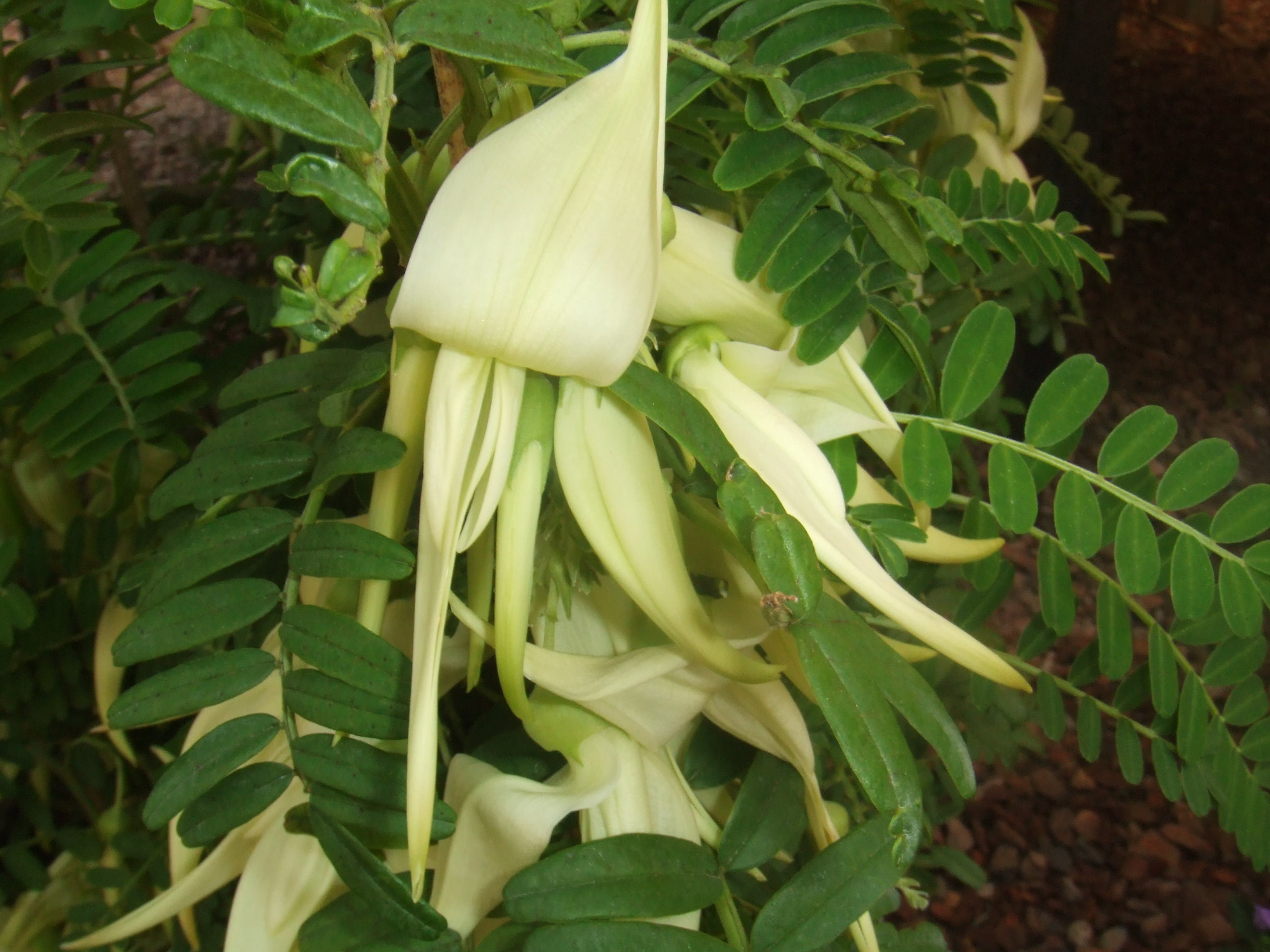
Variety with white flowers known as "Albus".
