= Alan Graham Apley =

British orthopaedic surgeon

Alan Graham Apley FRCS (10 November 1914, London – 20 December 1996) was a British orthopaedic surgeon and educator known for his textbook, Apley's System of Orthopaedics and Fractures, and for the Apley grind test in meniscal injury.

== Biography ==
Alan Apley was born in London in 1914, the youngest son of Polish Jewish immigrants. He studied medicine at University College Hospital, qualifying MBBS in 1938. He became a Fellow of the Royal College of Surgeons in 1941.

He served in the Army Medical Corps in Burma during the Second World War. After completing his training, he became a consultant at the Rowley Bristow Orthopaedic Hospital, Pyrford, where he started his FRCS course in 1948. The "Pyrford Postgraduate Course", which became known as the "Apley Course", continued twice yearly for many years, with over 5,000 trainees attending them. Satellite courses were also set up in New York City and Toronto, also running for over 15 years. Notes from this course were turned into a textbook, Apley's System of Orthopaedics and Fractures, which was first published in 1959, and is now in its ninth edition. He designed the first purpose-built emergency department in the south of England at St Peter's Hospital, Chertsey. He became director of orthopaedics at St Thomas' Hospital in 1972, and was elected to the council of the Royal College of Surgeons in 1973.

He was Honorary Treasurer of the British Orthopaedic Association from 1972 to 1977, and received an Honorary Fellowship in 1985. He became editor of The Journal of Bone and Joint Surgery in 1984. He delivered the Bradshaw Lecture at the Royal College of Surgeons in 1984 and was awarded the Honorary Medal of the Royal College of Surgeons.

He died in 1996. A trauma care/orthopaedics ward at St Thomas' has been named after him.

== See also ==
- Apley grind test
