= Apley Forge =

Village in Shropshire, England

Coordinates: 52.582°N 2.437°W

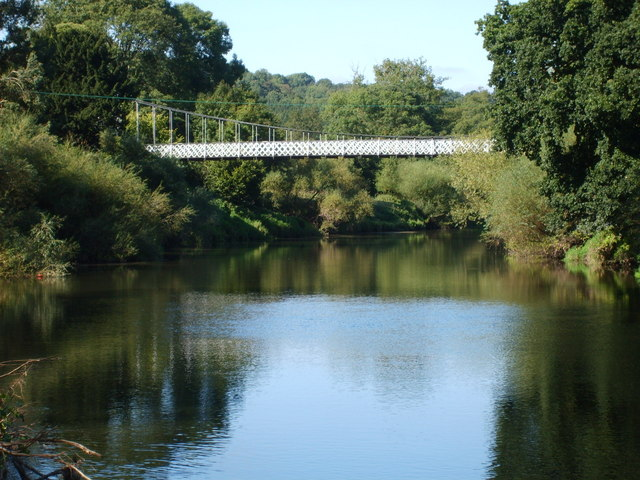
- Apley Suspension Bridge

- Location within Shropshire
- OS grid reference: SO703983
- Civil parish: Astley Abbotts
- Unitary authority: Shropshire
- Ceremonial county: Shropshire
- Region: West Midlands
- Country: England
- Sovereign state: United Kingdom
- Post town: BRIDGNORTH
- Postcode district: WV16
- Dialling code: 01952
- Police: West Mercia
- Fire: Shropshire
- Ambulance: West Midlands
- UK Parliament: Ludlow

Apley Forge is a village in Shropshire, England, north of the town of Bridgnorth.
