= Appley House =

English country house

Coordinates: 50°43′43″N 1°08′44″W

General information
- Town or city: Appley, Isle of Wight
- Country: England

Appley House (also: St Cecilia's Abbey) is an English country house and abbey in Appley Rise, Ryde, Isle of Wight.

== Geography ==
It is located at the extremity of Ryde, Isle of Wight. It is much and deservedly admired for the singular beauty of its situation. The wood, which grows close down to the sea-shore, is a noble object from the house, and presents an agreeable retreat from the heat of summer.

== History ==
It stands on the site of a house which was formerly occupied by a notorious smuggler named Boyce (d. 1740), who for a long series of years had been engaged in the illicit trade in the "back of the island," but having sufficiently increased his savings, he purchased Appley, and retired there, seemingly far removed from his former connections and avocations. Boyce even aspired to a seat in the legislature, smuggling not then being looked upon as a very heinous offence. It is located near Appley Towers, the seat of the William Hutt family who bought it in the 1870s. Appley was for many years the mansion house of the Hutt family. One of the proprietors of this estate was Governor of the Colony of Western Australia. The gallant Captain John Hutt, who so greatly distinguished himself, and fell in command of the Queen, in Lord Howe's glorious victory, on 1 June 1794, was also of this family. It was also the residence of James Hyde, Esq. "

It is now St Cecilia's Abbey.
