= Appley, Isle of Wight =

Coordinates: 50.725°N 01.145°W

Appley
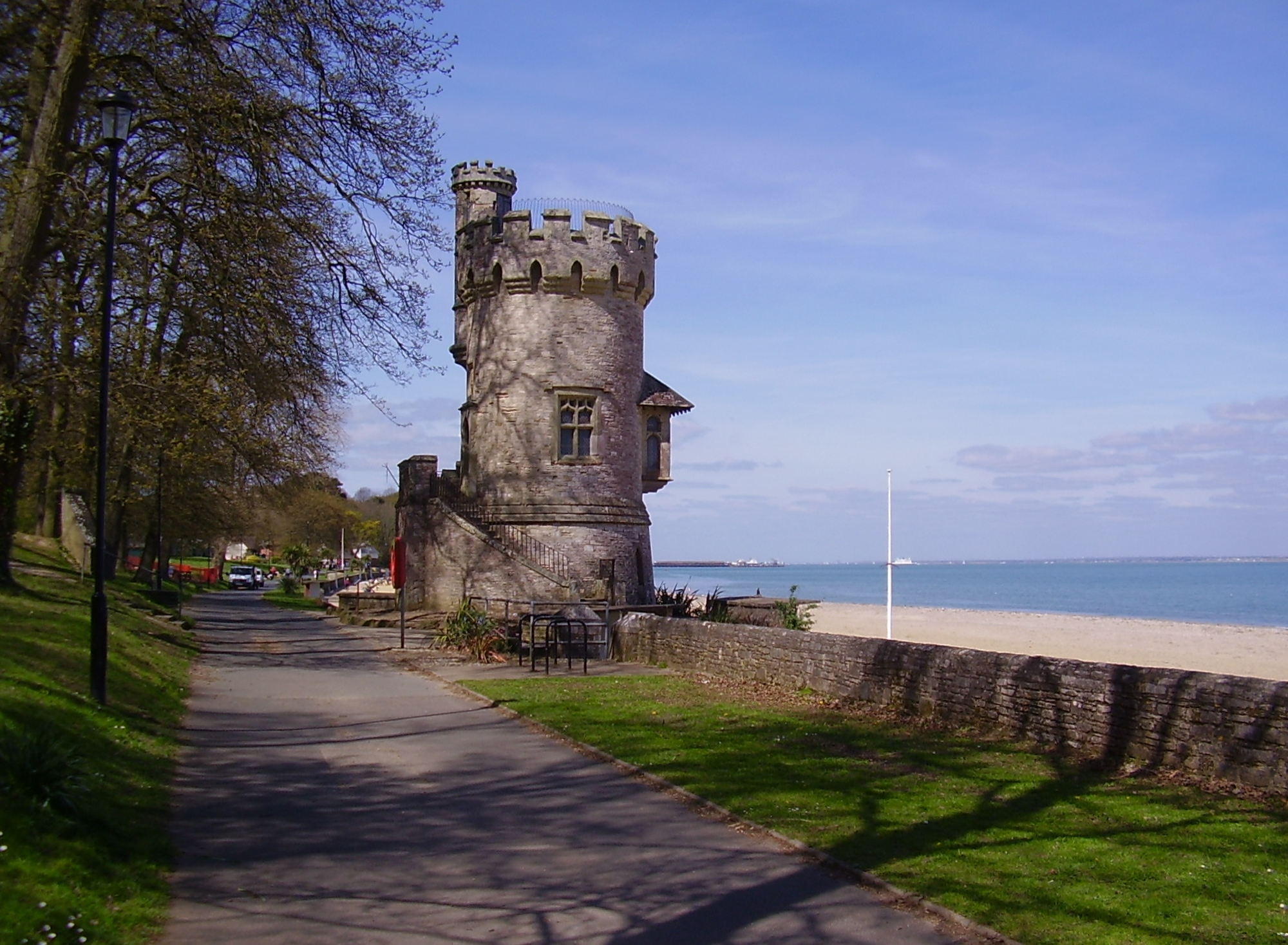
- Appley Tower.

- Location within the Isle of Wight
- OS grid reference: SZ6092
- Shire county: Isle of Wight
- Region: South East
- Country: England
- Sovereign state: United Kingdom
- Police: Hampshire and Isle of Wight
- Fire: Hampshire and Isle of Wight
- Ambulance: Isle of Wight

Appley is an area of Ryde on the Isle of Wight. Until the early 1960s, it was largely based on the former English country house of Appley Towers (seat of the Hutt family, and later of Sir Hedworth Williamson) and neighbouring Appley Farm.

The area's character changed with the construction of the Appley housing estate – a development of mainly detached houses and bungalows, built on either side of the B3330 Ryde to St Helens road. The names of the roads on the estate relate mostly either to proximity of the sea (Marina, Solent) or refer to Cumbrian lakes (Grasmere, Derwent). The area to the north of the Appley housing estate is now a public park, with the Solent beyond.

== Name ==
The name means 'the wood or clearing where apple trees grow', from Old English æppel and lēah.

1219: Appeley

1769: Great and Little Appley

1781: Appley

== Appley Tower ==
The stone-built tower by the sea wall dates from the days this land was the property of the Hutt family, as does the parkland itself, the latter being laid out to a design by Humphry Repton in 1798. In 2008, Appley Park became the first open space on the Isle of Wight to be awarded a Green Flag. The large villa just off the B3330 road, known previously as "Little Appley" at one time accommodated a school, as shown by the remaining sports field which adjoins it. This field is the home of archery club Wight Bowmen. The former school building now operates as a hotel and restaurant under the name Appley Manor. Appley House was the residence of Mr. Clayton.

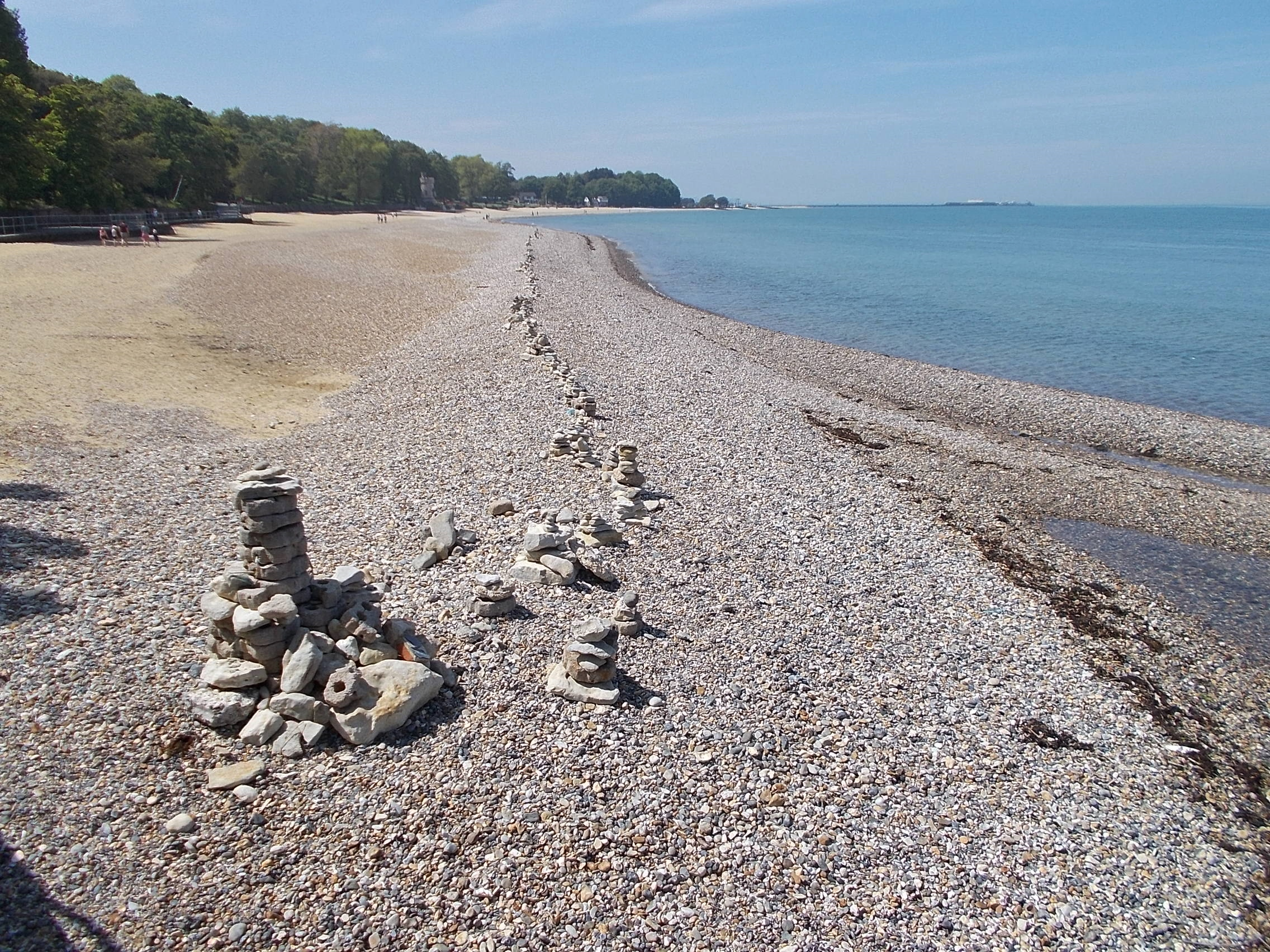
Appley beach

== See also ==
- St Cecilia's Abbey, Ryde
