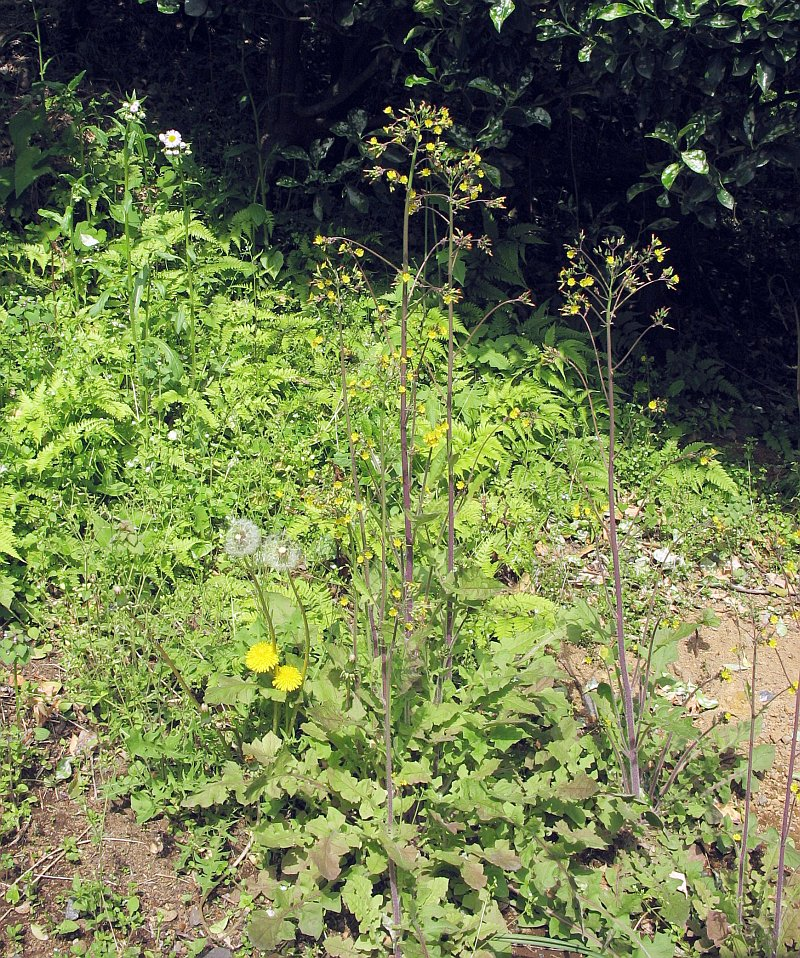
- Youngia japonica

Scientific classification
- Kingdom: Plantae
- Clade: Tracheophytes
- Clade: Angiosperms
- Clade: Eudicots
- Clade: Asterids
- Order: Asterales
- Family: Asteraceae
- Subfamily: Cichorioideae
- Tribe: Cichorieae
- Subtribe: Crepidinae
- Genus: Youngia; Cass.

Type species
- Youngia lyrata Cass.

Synonyms
- Crepis sect. Youngia (Cass.) Benth.; Hieraciodes Möhring ex Kuntze

= Youngia =

Genus of flowering plants

Youngia is a genus of Asian plants in the tribe Cichorieae within the family Asteraceae. There are several weedy species in the genus as well as the endangered Youngia nilgiriensis from Sispara in southern India, and Youngia japonica, which is also known as Japanese hawkweed.

Youngia was first described in 1831 by H. Cassini, and the genus was later united with Crepis. Taxonomic and cytogenetic studies by E. B. Babcock and G. Ledyard Stebbins led to the reclassification of the genus in the 1930s.

Species

- Youngia alashanica
- Youngia americana
- Youngia bifurcata
- Youngia blinii
- Youngia cineripappa
- Youngia erythrocarpa
- Youngia fusca
- Youngia fuscipappa
- Youngia hastiformis
- Youngia henryi
- Youngia heterophylla
- Youngia japonica
- Youngia kangdingensis
- Youngia lanata
- Youngia longiflora
- Youngia longipes
- Youngia mairei
- Youngia nansiensis
- Youngia napifolia
- Youngia nilgiriensis
- Youngia nujiangensis
- Youngia paleacea
- Youngia pilifera
- Youngia pratti
- Youngia pseudosenecio
- Youngia racemifera
- Youngia rosthornii
- Youngia rubida
- Youngia scaposa
- Youngia setigera
- Youngia silhetensis
- Youngia stebbinsiana
- Youngia taiwaniana
- Youngia terminalis
- Youngia wilsonii
- Youngia yilingii
