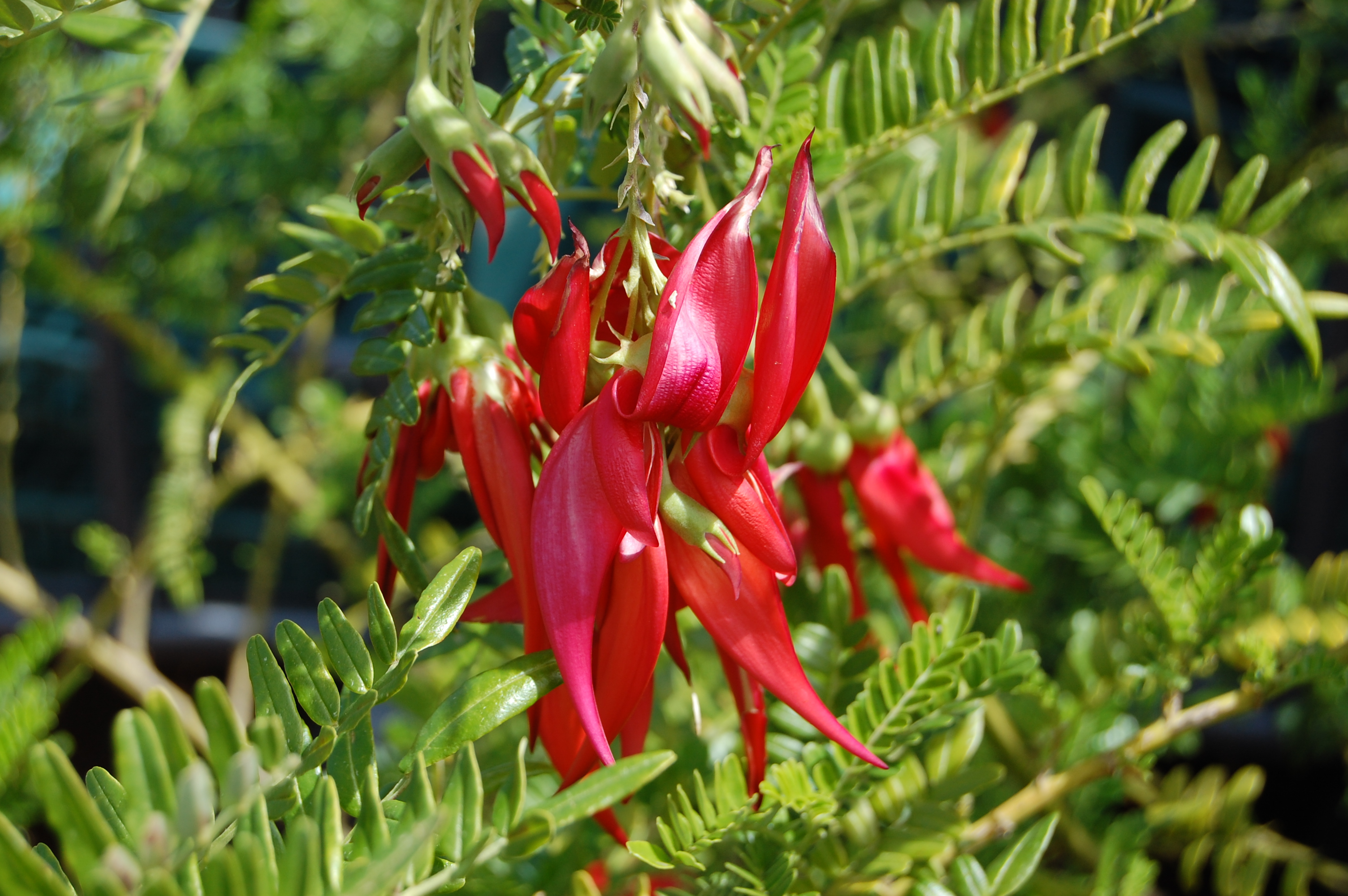

Conservation status
- Critically Endangered (IUCN 3.1)

Scientific classification
- Kingdom: Plantae
- Clade: Tracheophytes
- Clade: Angiosperms
- Clade: Eudicots
- Clade: Rosids
- Order: Fabales
- Family: Fabaceae
- Subfamily: Faboideae
- Genus: Clianthus
- Species: C. magnificus

Binomial name
- Clianthus magnificus (Van Houtte) C.Dickens

Synonyms
- Clianthus puniceus var. magnificus Van Houtte; Clianthus maximus Colenso; Clianthus puniceus var. maximus (Colenso) Kirk

= Clianthus magnificus =

Species of legume

Clianthus magnificus, commonly known as kaka beak (kōwhai ngutu-kākā in Māori), is a woody legume shrub native to New Zealand's North Island. It is one of two species of Clianthus (kaka beak) and both have striking clusters of red flowers which resemble the beak of the kaka, a New Zealand parrot.

The species is endangered in the wild, with only 153 trees found in a 2005 survey (down from over 1000 in 1996), in the East Coast and northern Hawkes Bay regions. In 2023, the plant was voted New Zealand's favourite plant of the year in a competition run by the New Zealand Plant Conservation Network.

== Description ==
C. magnificus is a small woody shrub which grows to 1.5–6 metres high. It has glossy green leaves and dark scarlet flowers which appear between August and December. The flowers hang in clusters of 15–20 blooms. The leaves are fern-like, with 15–30 pairs of evenly spaced glossy dark green leaflets. The stems are a soft wood and are easily broken. A single parent plant can cover a larger area, as its long, trailing stems can form new plants when they reach the soil. It is short-lived, lasting only 15–20 years.

It produces a green pea-like pod that will split when ripe to release its small and hard seeds, which are wind dispersed. The seeds are long-lived, and may still be viable after 30 years. They germinate in response to light gaps, enabling the plant to survive in semi-open environments.

As C. magnificus is a member of the pea family, it can perform nitrogen fixation.

== Taxonomy ==
It was first described as Clianthus puniceus var. magnificus Van Houtte by Louis van Houtte in 1854. It was elevated to the separate species Clianthus magnificus (Van Houtte) C.Dickens by Charles Dickens in 1856.

== In cultivation ==
Prior to the 1990s, C. magnificus was rarely cultivated, most stock available for cultivation being C. puniceus (then C. puniceus var. puniceus). C. magnificus is now widely available in garden shops in New Zealand.

== Conservation status ==
C. magnificus has been classed as Nationally Critical since 2009. There are only 153 confirmed trees in the wild, and their sites in the East Coast and northern Hawkes Bay regions are threatened by a range of factors (including browsing animals, disease, fire, and erosion).
