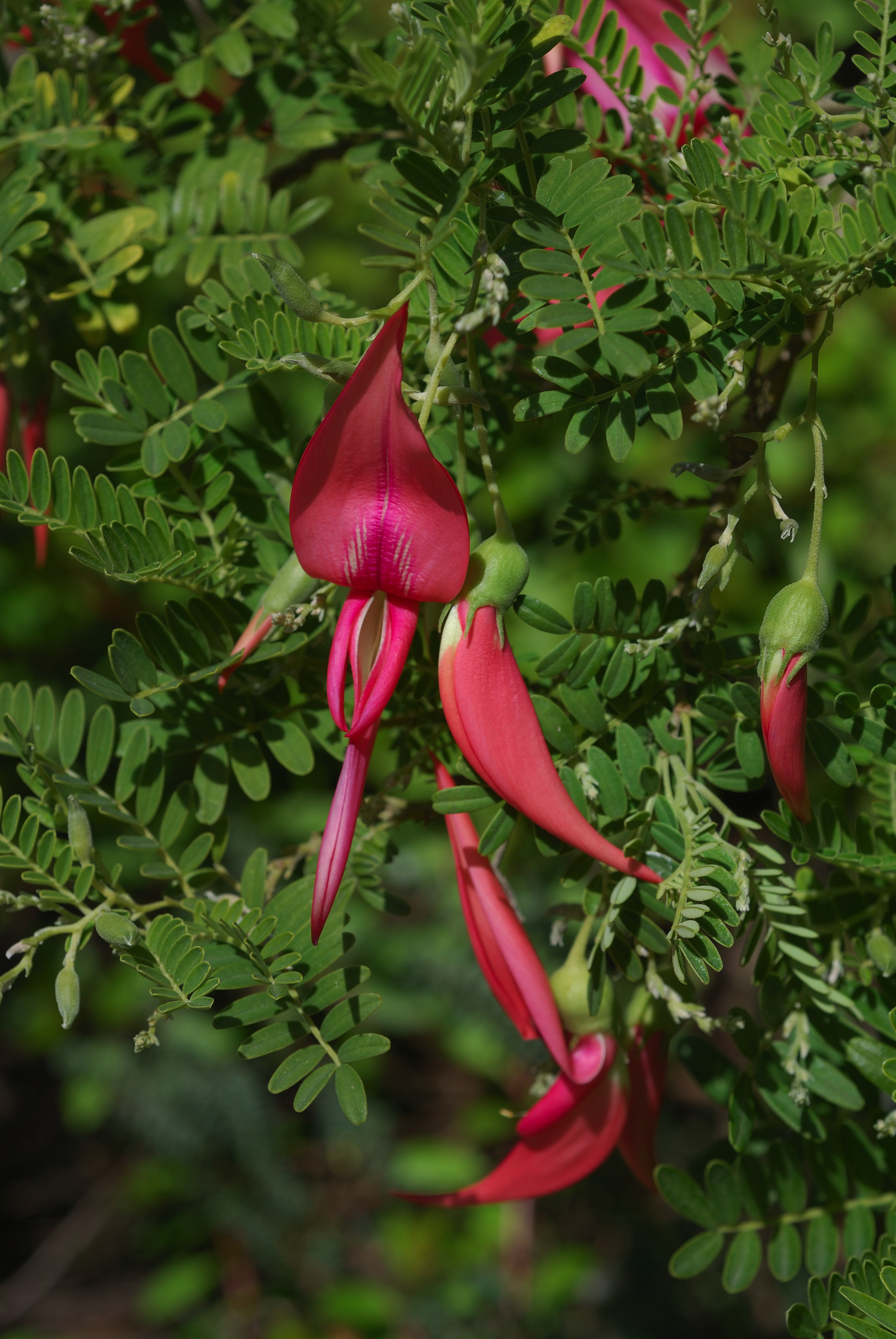

Conservation status
- Extinct in the Wild (IUCN 3.1)

- Nationally Critical (NZ TCS)

Scientific classification
- Kingdom: Plantae
- Clade: Tracheophytes
- Clade: Angiosperms
- Clade: Eudicots
- Clade: Rosids
- Order: Fabales
- Family: Fabaceae
- Subfamily: Faboideae
- Genus: Clianthus
- Species: C. puniceus

Binomial name
- Clianthus puniceus (G.Don) Sol. ex Lindl.
- It was endemic to the North Island of New Zealand, but is now extinct in the wild

Synonyms
- Donia punicea G.Don

= Clianthus puniceus =

Species of legume

Clianthus puniceus, also known as kaka beak or Kōwhai Ngutu-kākā in Māori, is a species of flowering plant in the genus Clianthus of the legume family Fabaceae that was endemic to New Zealand's North Island but has become extinct in the wild.

== Description ==
=== Vegetative characteristics ===
Clianthus puniceus is an evergreen shrub which can grow up to 3 meters tall, but generally grows to around 2 m (6 ft 7 in) with spreading branches producing leaf stalks up to 15 cm (6 in) long bearing 10–15 pairs of oblong leaflets. The leaves of are matte, due to its cuticle having a dense reticulum of buttressed ridges on the adaxial surface.

=== Generative characteristics ===
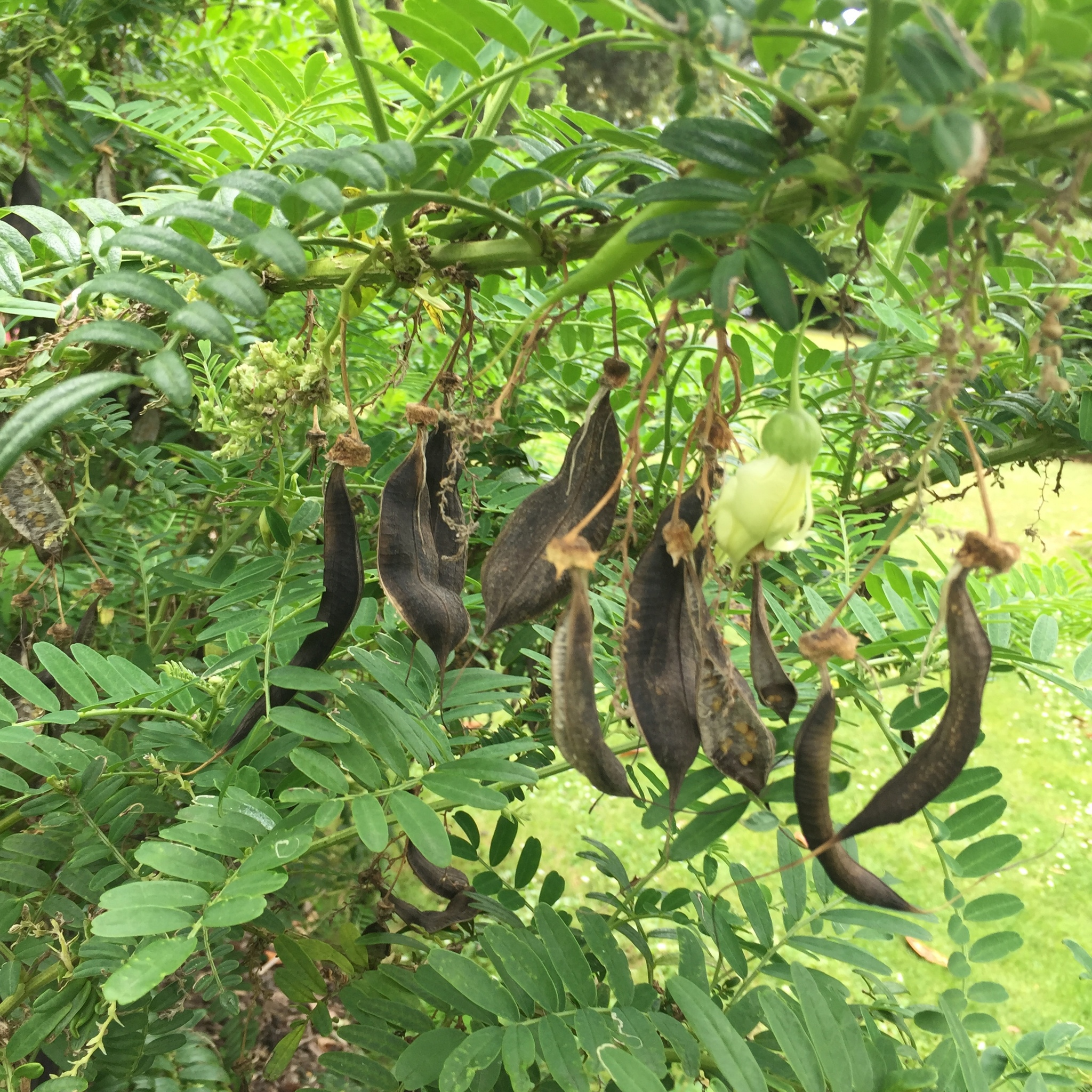
Clianthus puniceus plant with fruits

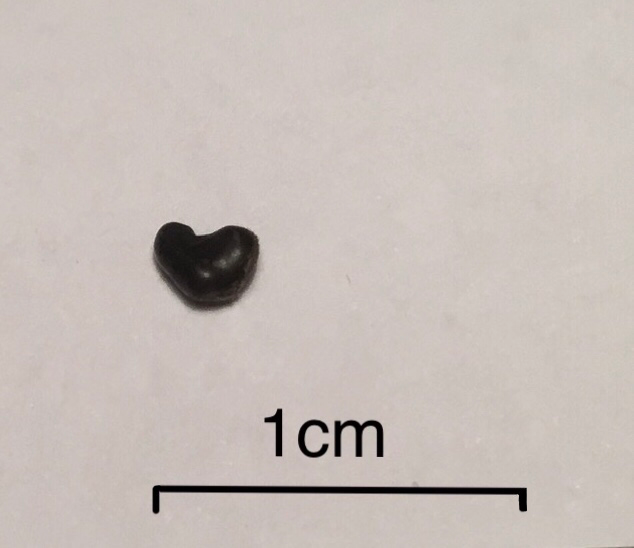
The heart-shaped seed of Clianthus puniceus

The axillary, pendent, racemose inflorescence bears red, white, cream, or pink, 6–8 cm long flowers that resemble beaks of the Kākā. The calyx is 5-toothed. The corolla consists of an upright petal, two lateral wing petals, and a downward keel petal. Clianthus puniceus are perfect flowers with a superior ovary and 10 stamens. The smooth, pendent, coriaceous, 5–9 cm long, and 0.8–2.2 cm wide fruits are formed from a single carpel and have three distinctive tissue layers: the endocarp, mesocarp, and exocarp. The fruit has a distinctive, very thick, up to 36-layered mesocarp and distinctive, 0.86 mm long fibres that are aligned with the longitudinal axis of the fruit.

=== Cytology ===
The chromosome count is 2n = 32.

== Taxonomy ==
It was first described as Donia punicea G.Don by George Don in 1832. It was moved to the genus Clianthus Sol. ex Lindl. as Clianthus puniceus (G.Don) Sol. ex Lindl. by John Lindley in 1835 based on previous work by Daniel Solander.

=== Etymology ===
The specific epithet puniceus refers to the reddish-purple colour of the flowers.

== Reproduction ==
It usually flowers from spring through to early summer, but can flower twice a year or even year round, and the amount of flowering vary each year.

The species has a cuticle that covers its stigma from early bud until flower for protection, and inhibits pollination when intact. Pollination can only occur with the rupture of the cuticle, which occurs naturally at flower senescence. However, it does rupture frequently prior to senescence. The cuticle is beneficial as it protects against as self-pollination and increases the changes of cross- pollination. However, even though a cross-pollination system is present, the observed small gene pool suggests that self-pollination occurs most often and is prevalent. This inbreeding could cause issues regarding localized bottlenecks as it's occurring in small populations.

When the time comes for self-pollination, the anthers dehisce, and the pollen naturally moves towards the stigma at the top of the keel. This gravitation is due to the pendulous nature of the flower.

It has been found that C. puniceus is mainly bird-pollinated. Even though the flowers don't have much scent for attraction, they contain nectar which attracts many birds such as tūī, korimako, and kākā.

=== Seed dispersal and dormancy ===
The seeds of C. puniceus are kidney-shaped with a mean weight of 0.016 g. Their hard seed coats protect the seeds as they are initially dispersed by gravity, either falling from the pods or still strongly attached to the pods by a mat of dense white hairs. Both the seeds and the pods will float in water, where secondary dispersal can occur. Wind also may disperse the seed, helped in part due to the pod's fiat, sail-like shape when dry.

Indirect evidence suggests that seeds can remain viable in soil for at least 29 years, but this evidence in inconclusive.

In natural populations, seedlings were primarily on steep banks or cliffs directly beneath established vegetation. Although gravity-driven dispersal could theorectically distribute seeds into unoccupied habitats, seedlings mortality remained high.

C. puniceus has been in decline over the past century; however, this is not attributed to the absence of viable seed, as seed production in the wild can be quite high.

== Distribution and habitat ==
Populations of Clianthus puniceus in the wild are rare and are only composed of a few plants. They can be found on cliffs, bluffs, or margins of bodies of water.

== Pests and parasites ==
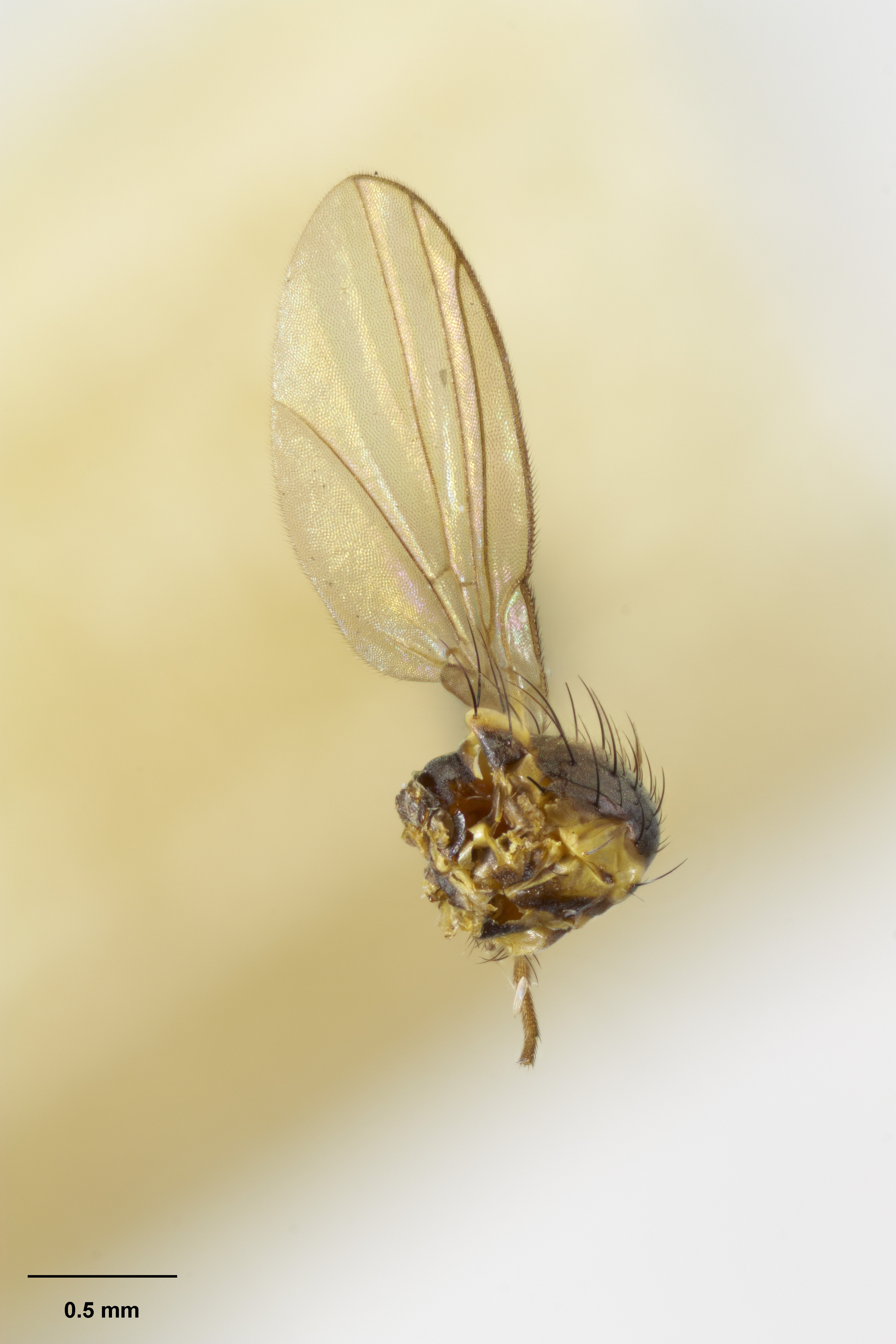
Liriomyza clianthi

C. puniceus plays host to the endemic leaf mining fly Liriomyza clianth.

Secondly, C. puniceus is also a host to Epiphyas postvittana, which is also known as the light brown apple moth. It is native to Australia and was distributed to New Zealand in the 1800s. The moth has the ability to damage the host, and have a negative environmental impact outside of its native area.

== Conservation ==
The distribution of the species in the wild was limited to North Island of New Zealand, but the species is currently listed as extinct in the wild by the IUCN. The last wild plants were extirpated around 2015, and no specimens were found in subsequent surveys. Causes of extinction in the wild included general loss of habitat, competition for space and establishment, as well as introduced herbivores who feed on them. The specific effect of humans on the population of C. puniceus should also be noted. Through seed collection, destruction of habitat, as well as introduction of invasive species, humans have contributed to the decline of the population. However, not all contributions are recognized as negative as lots of cultivation, propagation, and building of new habitats by humans have helped the survival of the species so far. It is cultivated in numerous ex-situ collections in botanic gardens, and until the 1990s, it used to be common in cultivation in private gardens. Most of the plants sold by nurseries as Clianthus puniceus are misidentified and belong to the species Clianthus magnificus. Genuine Clianthus puniceus plants are rarely seen in cultivation or for sale.

== Cultivation ==
Clianthus puniceus is widely cultivated today, and is interestingly one of the "first endemic plants to be grown in cultivation both in New Zealand and overseas". Due to the plant's striking flowers and form, seeds were sent from the gardens of Europeans in New Zealand overseas and to various parts of the world including California and England. Today, the plant is still cultivated in various parts of Europe.

Even though in New Zealand C.puniceus was previously widely grown as a garden plant, it has generally been replaced by the more robust Clianthus maximus. However, it is cultivated in the UK, where it has given rise to several cultivars. Both the species and the cultivar 'Roseus' have gained the Royal Horticultural Society's Award of Garden Merit (confirmed 2017).
