= Philip Anderson (abbot) =

American benedictine abbot

Right Reverend Father Philip Anderson OSB
- Benedictine Abbot of Clear Creek Abbey
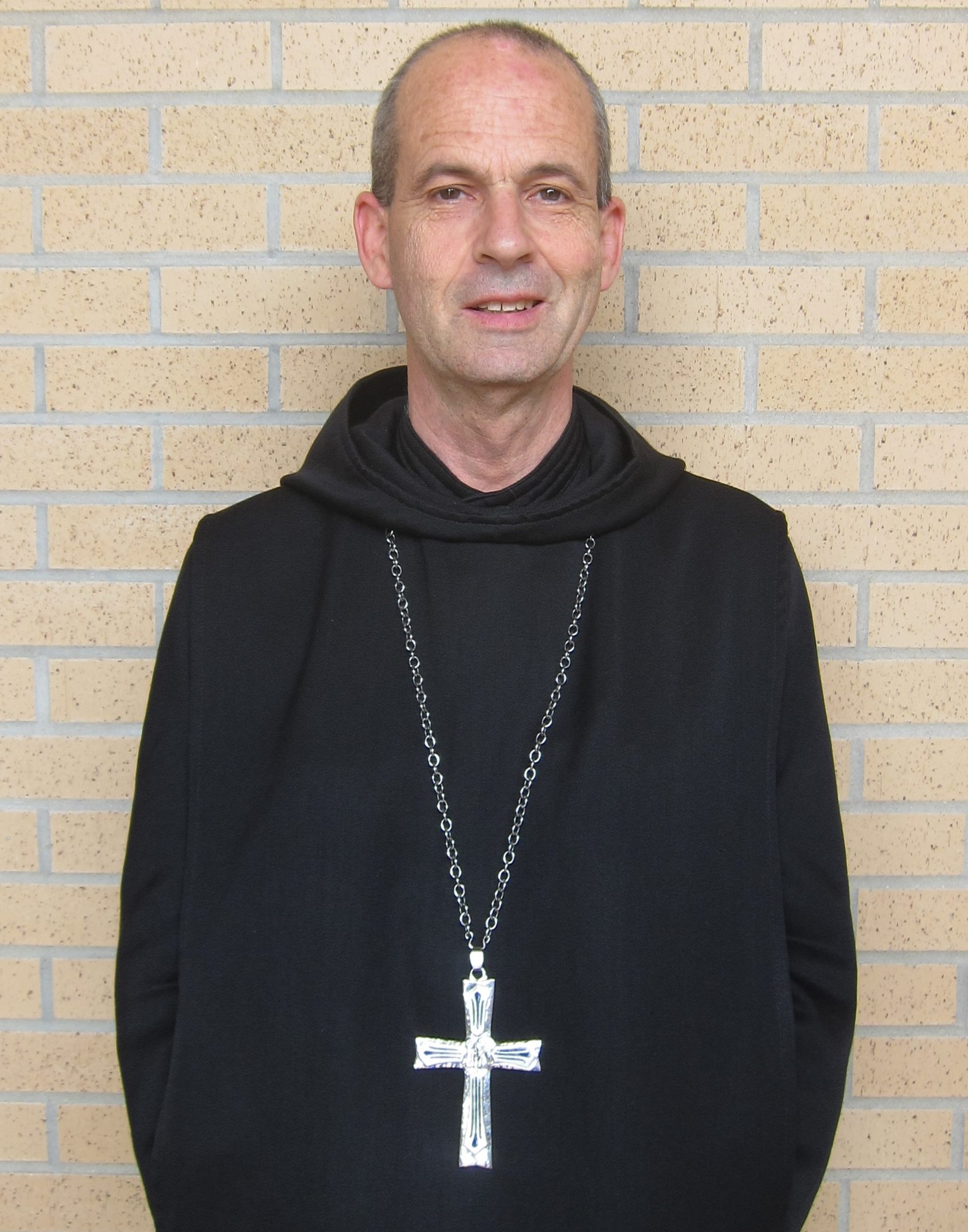
- Philip Anderson OSB
- Previous posts: Prior, Triors Abbey

Orders
- Ordination: 1984 (42 years) Fontgombault Abbey
- Rank: Abbot

Personal details
- Born: 1953 (age 72–73)
- Denomination: Catholic Church
- Motto: Nihil Amori Christi (Latin for 'Nothing to the Love of Christ')

Philip Anderson OSB (born in 1953), is an American Benedictine monk and current abbot of the monastery of Our Lady of Clear Creek Abbey, in Hulbert, Oklahoma. Born and raised in a Unitarian family, he converted to Catholicism during his university years and later pursued a monastic life. After serving in monasteries in France, Anderson helped establish Clear Creek Abbey in Oklahoma, which is known for its adherence to traditional monastic life and liturgy, including the 1962 Roman Missal and Gregorian chant.

== Early life and conversion ==
Born in 1953, Anderson's early life was spent in Prairie Village, Kansas, a suburb of Kansas City. For his higher education, he attended the University of Kansas, where he was part of an innovative undergraduate course known as the Pearson Integrated Humanities Program from 1971 to 1973. This program was instrumental in leading a wave of students, including Anderson, towards conversion to the Catholic Church.

== Monastic vocation ==
Following his academic pursuits, Anderson served a two-year enlistment in the United States Marines Corps from 1973 to 1975. Subsequently, he joined a contemplative Benedictine monastery in France, Notre Dame de Fontgombault Abbey, along with other graduates of the Pearson program at the University of Kansas.

Upon completion of his monastic formation and receiving ordination to the priesthood in 1984, Father Anderson, along with a group of others, was sent to establish a new monastery in southern France, Notre Dame de Triors. Here, he held several roles including prior, novice master, and lecturer of moral theology, and also contributed to the daily running of the monastery, including overseeing the chicken coop and vegetable garden.

== Return to the United States ==
In 1999, upon the invitation of Bishop Edward Slattery, Father Anderson and twelve other monks were sent back to the United States to establish the Clear Creek Monastery in the Diocese of Tulsa, Oklahoma. This monastery has since flourished into a vibrant community of over seventy monks.

On February 10, 2010, the feast of Saint Scholastica, the monastery was elevated to the status of an abbey. The next day, the feast of Our Lady of Lourdes, Father Philip Anderson was named the first abbot of Our Lady of Clear Creek Abbey. The abbatial blessing took place on April 10, 2010, from Bishop Edward Slattery. Anderson took as his abbatial motto Nihil Amori Christi, Latin for 'Nothing to the Love of Christ', taken from the fourth chapter of the Rule of Saint Benedict.

In February 2025, Anderson celebrated his 15th anniversary as abbot of the thriving community of monks, while the abbey celebrated the Silver Jubilee of its founding.
