= Hulbert, Oklahoma =

Town in Oklahoma, US

Hulbert, Oklahoma ᎦᏚᏏ (Cherokee)
- Town
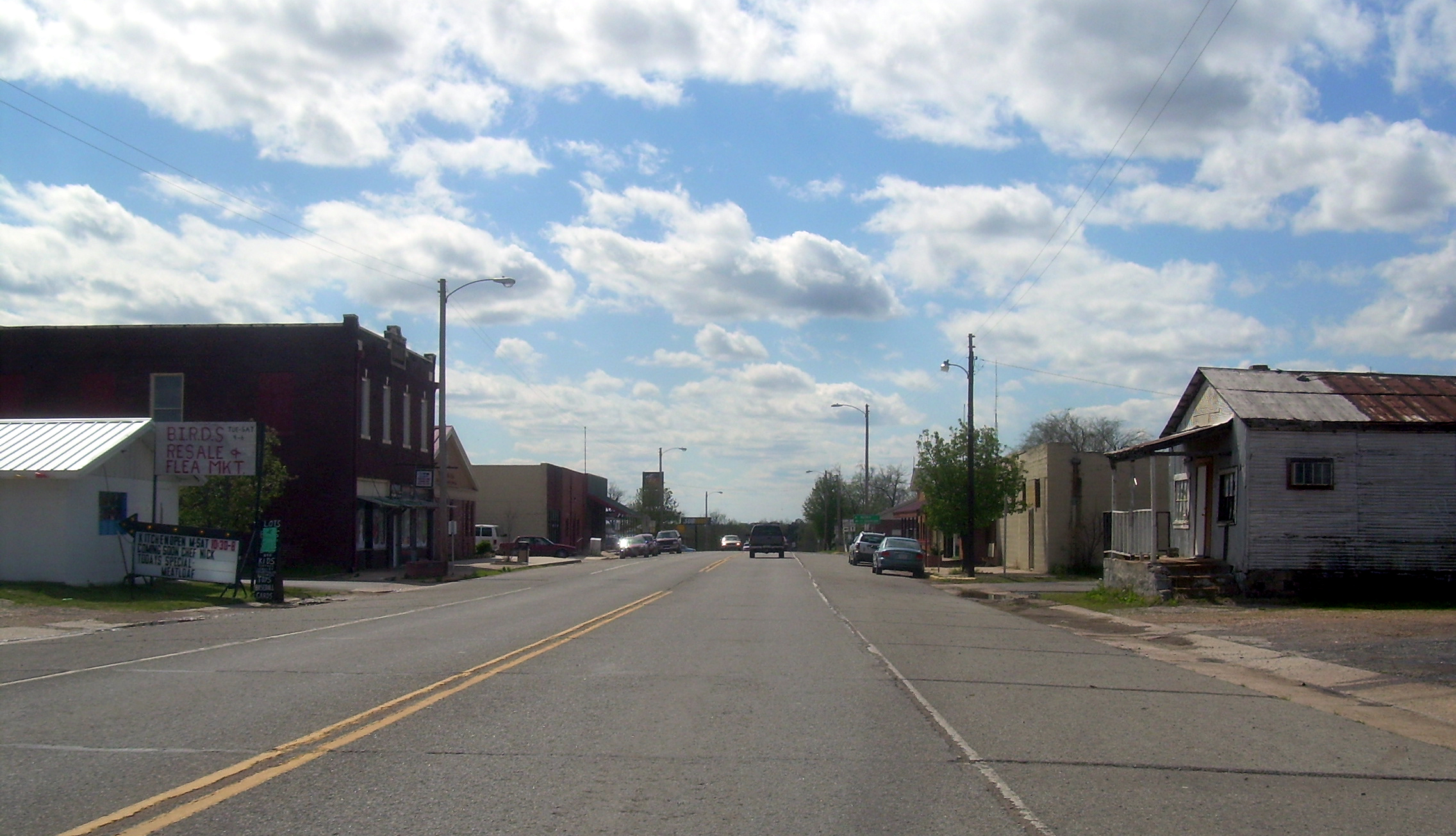
- Downtown Hulbert

- Location within Cherokee County and the state of Oklahoma
- Coordinates: 35°55′53″N 95°08′43″W
- Country: United States
- State: Oklahoma
- County: Cherokee
- Established: 1965

Government
  - Mayor: Kenneth Fore
  - Trustee: Amanda Hakes
  - Trustee: Tristan Brave
  - Treasurer/ Clerk: Seth Welch

Area
  - Total: 1.12 sq mi (2.90 km^{2})
  - Land: 1.12 sq mi (2.90 km^{2})
  - Water: 0 sq mi (0.00 km^{2})
- Elevation: 620 ft (190 m)

Population (2020)
  - Total: 483
  - Density: 431.5/sq mi (166.59/km^{2})
- Time zone: UTC-6 (Central (CST))
  - Summer (DST): UTC-5 (CDT)
- ZIP code: 74441
- Area codes: 539/918
- FIPS code: 40-36400
- GNIS feature ID: 2412779
- Website: townofhulbertok.gov

Hulbert (Cherokee: ᎦᏚᏏ, romanized: Gadusi) is a town in Cherokee County, Oklahoma, United States, named after Ben H. Hulbert, a prominent Cherokee man. The population was 483 at the 2020 census, previously it was 590 in 2010. Our Lady of the Annunciation of Clear Creek Monastery is a Benedictine monastery located in Hulbert. The Clear Creek Monastery, recently elevated to the status of an abbey, is a foundation abbey of France's Notre Dame de Fontgombault, which is itself a foundation abbey of Saint Pierre de Solesmes, also in France.

== History ==
The Hulbert Store and Grist Mill was built in 1890 were built between the towns of Wagoner and Tahlequah in 1890. According to local legend, a white trapper from Kentucky named Benjamin Hulbert married a Cherokee woman and built a store on her allotted land. A settlement formed around it. The community moved to its present location after the turn of the 20th Century to be closer to the nearest railroad. A post office opened there May 4, 1903. The town of Hulbert incorporated on January 18, 1965. It became a city in 1996.

== Geography ==
Hulbert is located in western Cherokee County. Oklahoma State Highway 51 passes through the town, leading east 10 miles (16 km) to Tahlequah, the county seat, and west 14 miles (23 km) to Wagoner. Fort Gibson Lake on the Neosho River is 7 miles (11 km) to the west on Highway 51.

According to the United States Census Bureau, the town has a total area of 1.0 square mile (2.7 km^{2}), all land.

== Demographics ==
Historical population
Census	Pop.	Note	%±
1970	505		—
1980	633		25.3%
1990	499		−21.2%
2000	543		8.8%
2010	590		8.7%
2020	483		−18.1%
U.S. Decennial Census

=== 2020 census ===
As of the 2020 census, Hulbert had a population of 483. The median age was 35.8 years. 26.1% of residents were under the age of 18 and 15.9% of residents were 65 years of age or older. For every 100 females there were 89.4 males, and for every 100 females age 18 and over there were 89.9 males age 18 and over.

0.0% of residents lived in urban areas, while 100.0% lived in rural areas.

There were 193 households in Hulbert, of which 39.4% had children under the age of 18 living in them. Of all households, 28.0% were married-couple households, 22.8% were households with a male householder and no spouse or partner present, and 46.1% were households with a female householder and no spouse or partner present. About 33.2% of all households were made up of individuals and 16.0% had someone living alone who was 65 years of age or older.

There were 246 housing units, of which 21.5% were vacant. The homeowner vacancy rate was 9.0% and the rental vacancy rate was 10.4%.

Racial composition as of the 2020 census
Race	Number	Percent
White	168	34.8%
Black or African American	0	0.0%
American Indian and Alaska Native	189	39.1%
Asian	1	0.2%
Native Hawaiian and Other Pacific Islander	0	0.0%
Some other race	10	2.1%
Two or more races	115	23.8%
Hispanic or Latino (of any race)	28	5.8%

=== 2000 census ===
As of the census of 2000, there were 543 people, 214 households, and 148 families residing in the town. The population density was 572.1 inhabitants per square mile (220.9/km^{2}). There were 245 housing units at an average density of 258.1 units per square mile (99.7 units/km^{2}). The racial makeup of the town was 44.94% White, 47.15% Native American, and 7.92% from two or more races. Hispanic or Latino of any race were 0.18% of the population.

There were 214 households, out of which 36.9% had children under the age of 18 living with them, 42.1% were married couples living together, 20.6% had a female householder with no husband present, and 30.4% were non-families. 26.6% of all households were made up of individuals, and 12.6% had someone living alone who was 65 years of age or older. The average household size was 2.54 and the average family size was 3.01.

In the town, the population was spread out, with 29.8% under the age of 18, 12.3% from 18 to 24, 26.9% from 25 to 44, 19.5% from 45 to 64, and 11.4% who were 65 years of age or older. The median age was 29 years. For every 100 females, there were 82.2 males. For every 100 females age 18 and over, there were 83.2 males.

The median income for a household in the town was $19,886, and the median income for a family was $24,063. Males had a median income of $23,333 versus $19,107 for females. The per capita income for the town was $9,508. About 23.7% of families and 26.5% of the population were below the poverty line, including 28.7% of those under age 18 and 34.4% of those age 65 or over.

== Community ==
NeoHealth—Northeastern Oklahoma Community Health Centers is headquartered in Hulbert and operates five clinics: Hulbert Health Center in Hulbert, Tahlequah Health Center, Tahlequah Extended Care Clinic, and NeoHealth OB/GYN Associates in Tahlequah, Westville Family Medical Center, Salina Family Medical Center in Salina, and NeoHealth Muskogee. NeoHealth also opened a pharmacy in Hulbert in April 2012.

Lake Region Electric Cooperative (LREC) provides electricity to most of Cherokee and surrounding counties.
