= IHP =

IHP may refer to:

- Indicated horsepower
- Innovations for High Performance Microelectronics, a German institute and part of the Gottfried Wilhelm Leibniz Scientific Community
- Institut Henri Poincaré, a mathematics research institute in Paris, France
- Integrated Humanities Program
- International Hydrological Programme
