= Randol =

Randol or Randoll may refer to:

== People ==
=== Given name ===
- Randoll Coate (1909–2005), British diplomat and maze designer
- Randol Fawkes (1924–2000), Bahamian politician
- E. Randol Schoenberg (born 1966), American lawyer

=== Surname ===
- Alanson Merwin Randol (1837–1887), American Civil War officer
- George Randol (1895–1973), American film actor and director

== Places ==
- Randol Township, Cape Girardeau County, Missouri, USA
- Randol Abbey, a Benedicting monastery near Saint-Saturnin, France
