= Philip Anderson =

Philip Anderson or Phillip Anderson may refer to:

== People ==
- Philip W. Anderson (1923–2020), American physicist and Nobel laureate
- Philip W. Anderson (film editor) (1915–1980), American film editor
- Phil Anderson (footballer) (born 1948), Northern Irish footballer, see List of Bury F.C. players (1–24 appearances)
- Philip Anderson (abbot) (born 1953), American Benedictine abbot
- Phil Anderson (cyclist) (born 1958), Australian racing cyclist
- Phillip Anderson (pole vaulter), co-winner of the 1944 NCAA DI outdoor pole vault championship

== Fictional characters ==
- Philip Anderson (Sherlock), character in British television series

== See also ==
- Philip Andersen (born 1980), Danish race car driver
- Anderson (surname)
