= Gaussan Abbey =

Benedictine monastery in Aude, France

Coordinates: 43°8′6″N 2°50′33″E

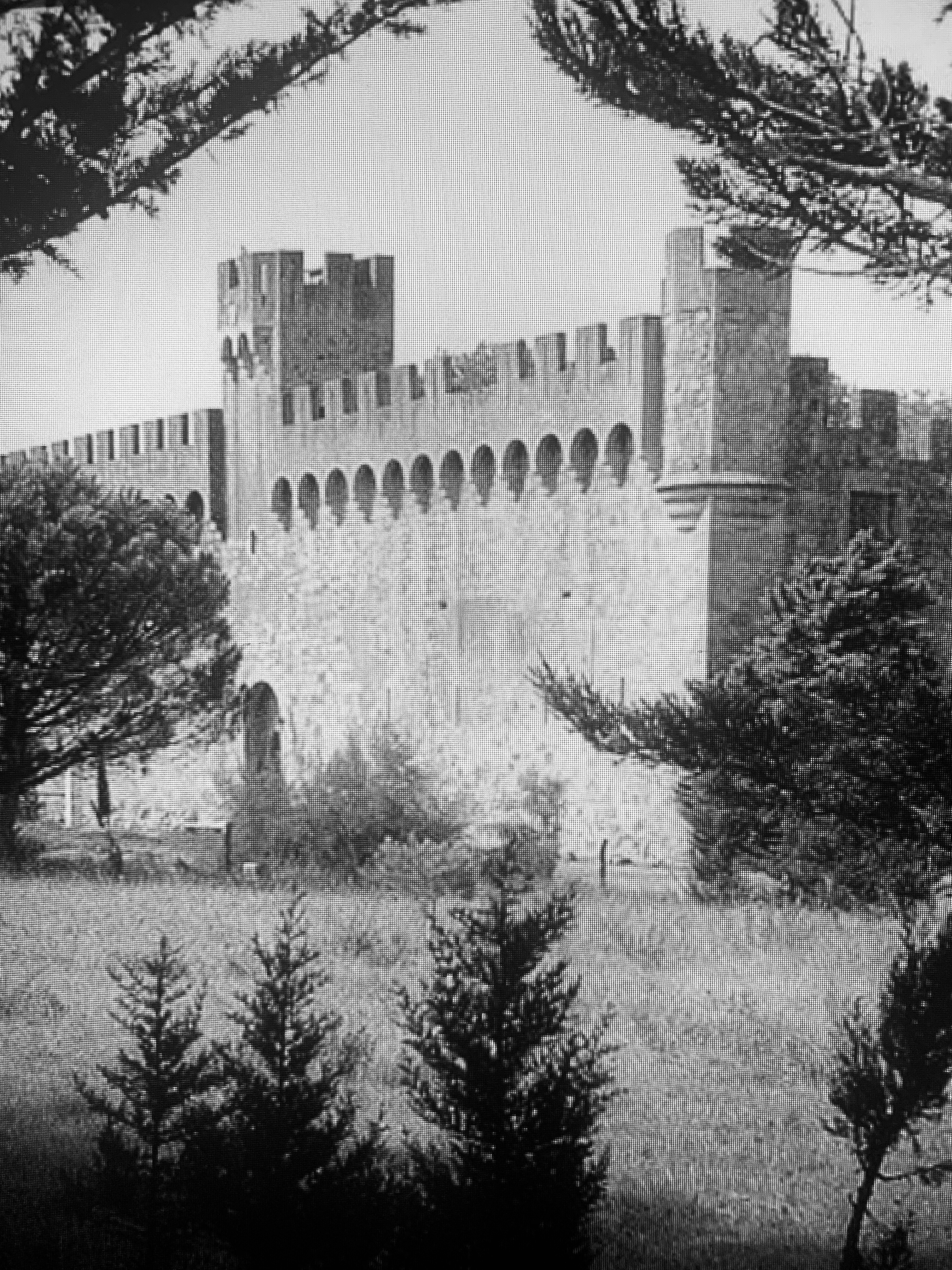
Gaussan Abbey

Gaussan Abbey (French: Abbaye Notre-Dame de Gaussan) is a Benedictine monastery situated at Bizanet in the Aude, France.

== Cistercians ==
The site was originally established in the 12th century by the Cistercians as a grange of the nearby Fontfroide Abbey. Fontfroide was dissolved and its buildings and assets, including the grange at Gaussan, were sold off in 1791 during the French Revolution.

== Private ownership ==
During the later 19th and 20th centuries the buildings were refurbished by the proprietor, Charles Lambert de Sainte-Croix, who also developed the land for viticulture

== Benedictines ==
The property was later acquired by the Benedictines and in 1994 a monastery was founded here as a priory of Fontgombault Abbey.

It became an abbey in 2004.

It is part of the Solesmes Congregation of the Benedictine Confederation and as such focusses on Gregorian chant and the Tridentine Mass.

The monks also produce wine.

== Sources ==
- Bizanet Village website: page on Gaussan Abbey
