= Charles Lambert de Sainte-Croix =

French journalist and politician

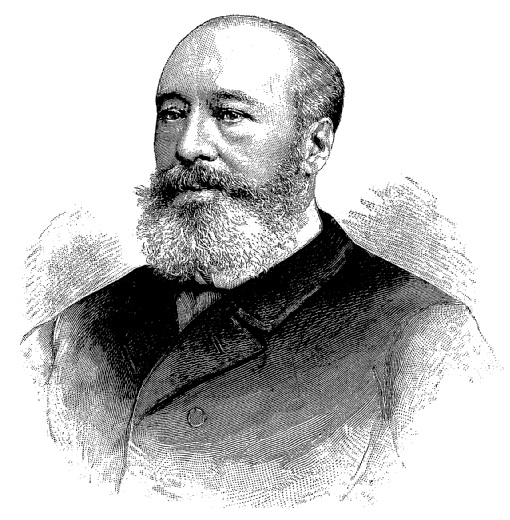
- Lambert de Sainte-Croix from L'Univers illustré, 9 November 1889

Deputy for Aude
- In office 8 February 1871 – 31 December 1875

Senator of Aude
- In office 30 January 1876 – 24 January 1885

Deputy for Landes
- In office 4 October 1885 – 14 February 1886

Personal details
- Born: Charles-Louis-Marie Lambert de Sainte-Croix; 12 November 1827 Paris, France
- Died: 27 October 1889 (aged 61) Paris, France
- Occupation: Lawyer, journalist, politician

Charles Lambert de Sainte-Croix (12 November 1827 – 27 October 1889) was a French journalist and politician who was a national deputy and then an Orléanist senator during the French Third Republic. He was also a successful winemaker.

== Journalist ==
Charles-Louis-Marie Lambert de Sainte-Croix (Note: His family home was in the Rue Sainte-Croix de la Bretonnerie, which gave rise to rumours that he had added "Sainte-Croix" to his name without having the right to that indication of good family, but in fact the name was legitimate.) was born in Paris on 12 November 1827, son of an advocate. He studied Law in Paris, and became vice-president of the Conférence Molé, where he opposed the imperial regime. He contributed to the Courrier du dimanche and then the Journal de Paris with money, writings and speech, and through this gained some reputation as being a liberal. During the elections of 1863 the men putting up posters for Adolphe Thiers came to the newspaper office and said the police were bothering them. Lambert, wearing full evening dress and gloves, took a batch of posters and a bucket of glue and covered the arcades of the Rue de Rivoli with the posters. In 1869, Lambert ran unsuccessfully for election as deputy for Aube. During the Siege of Paris (1870–71) he served in the National Guard.

== Politician ==
On 8 February 1871 Lambert de Sainte-Croix was elected representative of Aube in the National Assembly. He sat with the center right, and was one of the most active in the Orléanist party. He was on the list of candidates to be made a life senator by the Assembly, but was not chosen. However, on 30 January 1876 he was elected Senator of Aude. In the late 1870s, Lambert flirted with the Bonapartistes, before returning to the Orléanist fold.

Lambert played a key role as head of the royalist party's propaganda organization in organizing the 1885 elections. He was not reelected on 6 January 1885. He was elected on 4 October 1885 as deputy for Landes on the conservative list. However, the Landes election was declared invalid and he had to run again on 14 February 1886, and this time narrowly failed. He lost influence with Orleanist leadership after 1886, becoming increasingly suspicious, rigid and ineffective. His nominal subordinate Eugène Degeille took on most of his functions.

== Winemaker ==
Gaussan Abbey had been made public property in 1791 and sold during the French Revolution. Lambert de Sainte-Croix inherited the property in a period when the Aude wine industry was prospering, and transformed the domain into a vineyard and the old grange into a neo-medieval castle. He profited during the phylloxera crisis, which reached the region in 1878 at a time when the approach of grafting vines onto American rootstock was already well known. During the 1880s the price of wine more than quadrupled.

Charles Lambert died in Paris on 27 October 1889.

== Sources ==
- Irvine, William D. (1989), The Boulanger Affair Reconsidered: Royalism, Boulangism, and the Origins of the Radical Right in France, Oxford University Press, ISBN 978-0-19-505334-0
- Le château de Gaussan (in French), PNRNM
- Robert, Adolphe; Cougny, Gaston (1889–1891), "LAMBERT DE SAINTE-CROIX (CHARLES-LOUIS-MARIE)", in Edgar Bourloton (ed.), Dictionnaire des Parlementaires français (1789-1889) (in French)
