= List of senators of Aude =

Location of Aude in France

Following is a list of senators of Aude, people who have represented the department of Aude in the Senate of France.

== Third Republic ==
Senators for Aude under the French Third Republic were:

- Charles Lambert de Sainte-Croix (1876-1885)
- Pierre-Louis Beraldi (1876-1885)
- Théophile Marcou (1885-1893)
- Émile Lades-Gout (1885-1893)
- Eugène Mir (1894-1921)
- Jules Rivals (1894) – election invalidated
- Armand Gauthier (1894-1926)
- Auguste Barbaza (1904-1912)
- Étienne Dujardin-Beaumetz (1912-1913)
- Maurice Sarraut (1913-1932)
- Jean Durand (1921-1936)
- Albert Sarraut (1926-1940)
- Clément Raynaud (1932-1940)
- Jacques Guilhem (1937-1940)

== Fourth Republic ==
Senators for Aude under the French Fourth Republic were:

- Baptiste Roudel (1946–1948)
- Émile Roux (1948–1959)
- Antoine Courrière (1946–1959)

== Fifth Republic ==
Senators for Aude under the French Fifth Republic:

Period	Name	Group or party	Notes
1959–1974	Antoine Courrière	Groupe socialiste	Died in office 20 September 1974
1959–1967	Georges Guille	Groupe socialiste	Resigned 3 April 1967 when elected deputy
1967–1968	Jules Fil	Groupe socialiste	Died in office 23 September 1968
1968–1980	Marcel Souquet	Groupe socialiste	Replaced Jules Fil on 24 September 1968
1974–1981	Raymond Courrière	Socialist Party (France) (PS)	Resigned 22 July 1981 to join cabinet
1980–present	Roland Courteau	Socialist Party (France) (PS)	
1981–1986	Pierre Bastié	Socialist Party (France) (PS)	Replaced Raymond Courrière on 24 July 1981; Resigned 16 July 1986
1986–2006	Raymond Courrière	Socialist Party (France) (PS)	Died in office 1 August 2006
2006–2014	Marcel Rainaud	Socialist Party (France) (PS)	Replaced Raymond Courrière on 12 August 2006
2014–present	Gisèle Jourda	Socialist Party (France) (PS)	Elected September 2014

== Sources ==
- Liste des anciens sénateurs de la IIIème République par circonscription (in French), Sénat de France
- Liste des anciens sénateurs de la IVème République par circonscription (in French), Sénat de France
- Liste des anciens sénateurs de la Vème République par circonscription (in French), Sénat de France
- Liste par département - Aude (in French), Sénat de France
