= Integrated Humanities Program =

Program at the University of Kansas

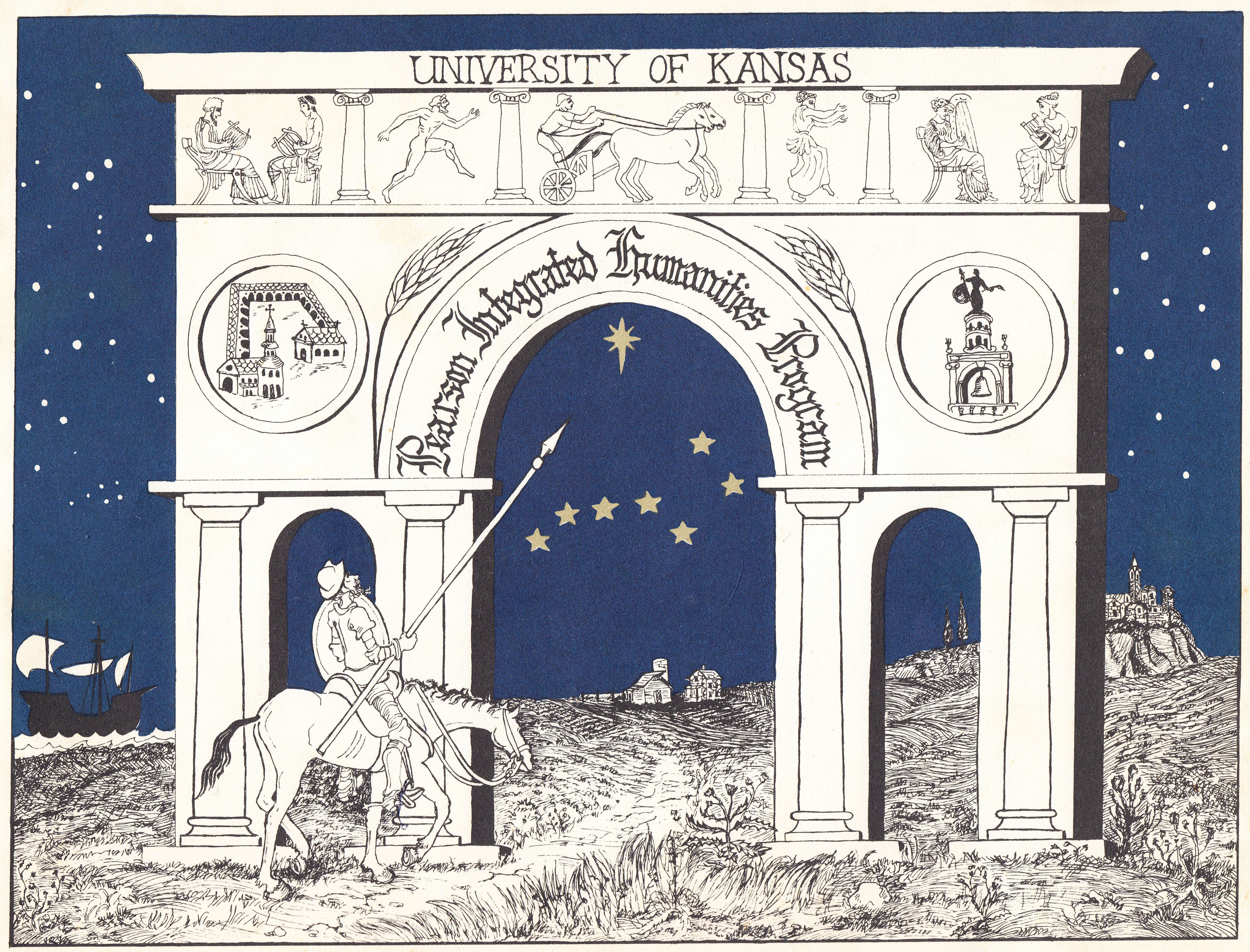
- Pearson Integrated Humanities Program Booklet Cover
- Former names: Pearson Integrated Humanities Program
- Motto: Nascantur in Admiratione
- Motto in English: Let Them Be Born in Wonder
- Active: 1970–1979
- Parent institution: University of Kansas
- Director: Dennis Quinn
- Academic staff: Dennis Quinn, John Senior, Frank Nelick

The Integrated Humanities Program (IHP), also known as the Pearson Integrated Humanities Program, was an undergraduate program at the University of Kansas during the 1970s. The program taught a curriculum based on the Great Books. It was led by three members of the faculty: Dr. Dennis Quinn, Dr. John Senior, and Dr. Frank Nelick.

== Academics and activities ==
In the words of Dennis Quinn, the program sought to "teach the Great Books, the classics, from the Greeks up through the Romans and through the Middle Ages and the Renaissance into the modern times.” In addition to studying the great books, the students also got together for poetry memorization, singing folk songs, formal waltzing lessons, and stargazing, an activity the founders thought to be one of the greatest sources of wonder.

According to Micah Meadowcroft, writing for National Affairs, IHP was "short-lived but enormously influential". Several alumni went on to found Cair Paravel Latin School in Topeka.

== Catholic conversions and disbandment ==
After numerous conversions on the part of students to Catholicism and the subsequent publishing of an article on the part of the Kansas City Times newspaper depicting a Darwinian evolution of a hippie gradually becoming a Catholic monk, the university administration set up an investigation of the program to determine whether or not the three faculty were proselytizing. Ultimately, the program was disbanded following the investigations, despite the investigation group having issued a statement saying "In the face of charges of religious indoctrination and proselytizing, the Committee has found no evidence that the professors of the program have engaged in such activities in the classroom."

== Notable alumni ==
A number of Catholic leaders in America were formed in the program such as Dr. David Whalen, professor and former provost of Hillsdale College, Bishop James Conley of the Diocese of Lincoln, Nebraska (who converted to Catholicism with Dr. Senior as his godfather), Archbishop Paul Coakley of the Archdiocese of Oklahoma City, Oklahoma, and Dom Philip Anderson, abbot of Our Lady Of The Annunciation of Clear Creek Abbey. A number of the founding monks of Clear Creek were students of John Senior and his legacy is remembered there on various occasions, a number of his works are available in their bookstore.

Dr. Robert Carlson, one of the three founders of Wyoming Catholic College, its first academic dean, and the author of its philosophical vision statement, also is an alumnus of the program. The curriculum and instruction at St. Gregory the Great Academy and St. Martin's Academy are based upon on Senior's principles.
