= St Benedict Patron of Europe Association =

St Benedict Patron of Europe Association (Latin: Associatio Sancti Benedicti Patroni Europae, ASBPE) is a Catholic International association of the faithful in the Benedictine spirituality.

The association was founded by abbots and bishops from various European countries, including Abbot President Sighard Kleiner O. Cist. and Dom Jean Roy, Abbot of Notre-Dame de Fontgombault, Bishop Jean Rupp of Monaco and Bishop François Charrière of Fribourg in Switzerland. It was founded in 1967 after Paul VI in his Apostolic Letter Pacis Nuntius (1964) proclaimed Benedict of Nursia as the Patron of Europe. The aims of the association were further confirmed in John Paul II’s Apostolic Letter Sanctorum Altrix (1980) on relevance of the Rule of Saint Benedict, calling attention to a new evangelisation. On 11 July 1988 the Pontifical Council for the Laity established ASBPE as an international association of the faithful of Pontifical Right.

The abbot of Fontgombault, Antoine Forgeot, was the secretary general of the Association as of 1989.

In September 1991, the association held its 23rd International Congress at the Cistercian Abbey of Hauterive in Switzerland. The conference was scheduled to be chaired by Hans Hermann Groër, then archbishop of Vienna, and Amédée Grab, then auxiliary bishop of Geneva. Speakers were set to include Kurt Furgler, former president of the Swiss Confederation and Thomas Goppel, a Bavarian state minister.

In September 1997, the association held a congress in Canterbury on the theme of Benedictine discretion.

The association celebrated its 50th anniversary in 2017 at Praglia Abbey in Italy, where it received greetings from Robert Sarah, then prefect of the Congregation for Divine Worship and the Discipline of the Sacraments.

The main purpose of the Association is to promote and encourage a range of values and traditions, connected with the Association's view of a "truly Christian Europe". This includes promoting the Church's liturgy, Gregorian chant and protecting traditional crafts. The Association draws its inspiration from their understanding of the influence of the Rule of Saint Benedict of Nursia, in terms of shaping a Christian spirit on Europe. An abbot of a Benedictine or Cistercian abbey is the spiritual advisor of the ASBPE. The association organises yearly international congresses open to all, and in addition an annual pilgrimage to a monastery. The national groups organise days of study and prayer. The association has members also in North America.

The ASBPE seat is Triors Abbey, where the abbot, Dom Hervé Courau, is the Association's general secretary as of 2025.

== See also ==
- The Benedict Option

== Publications ==
- Saint Benoît, maître pour l'Europe [St. Benedict, a Teacher for Europe] (in French). Poitiers: ASBPE Éditeur. 1979.
- Mots d'ordre pour la nouvelle évangélisation [Watchwords for the new evangelization] (in French). Poitiers: P. Oudin. 1993. ISBN 2-901460-03-8.
- Proceedings of recent Congresses, from 2009 to 2016 (limited edition in 2017)
