= The Benedict Option =

2017 book by Rod Dreher

- First edition
- Author: Rod Dreher
- Language: English
- Publisher: Sentinel
- Publication date: 2017
- Publication place: United States
- Media type: Print
- Pages: 304
- ISBN: 978-0-735-21330-2

The Benedict Option: A Strategy for Christians in a Post-Christian Nation is a 2017 book by writer and conservative commentator Rod Dreher on Christianity and Western culture. Drawing very loosely on the writings of early Christian monk Benedict of Nursia and the philosophy of Alasdair MacIntyre, Dreher argues for the formation of virtuous Christian communities in response to an increasingly secular culture. The book produced discussion and debate in Christian and secular circles over the issues of cultural engagement and the direction of Christian communities. Although Alasdair MacIntyre was claimed as an inspiration for the movement, MacIntyre has criticized its proposal of retreating from broader society.

== Themes ==
The Benedict Option's title is taken from a quote by Alasdair MacIntyre in his book After Virtue in which he writes, "If the tradition of the virtues was able to survive the horrors of the last dark ages, we are not entirely without hope ... We are waiting not for a Godot, but for another—doubtless very different—St. Benedict." Dreher's idea of a "Benedict option" involves finding the communities in which virtuous life can flourish, since Dreher argues that the existing culture has already forsaken the virtues. These communities are not necessarily physical in nature and do not necessitate migration to Christian centers of life, but do involve institutions such as churches, schools, and other organizations.

The book's front jacket reads:

Today, a new post-Christian barbarism reigns. Many believers are blind to it, and their churches are too weak to resist. Politics offers little help in this spiritual crisis. What is needed is the Benedict Option, a strategy that draws on the authority of Scripture and the wisdom of the ancient church. The goal: to embrace exile from the mainstream culture and construct a resilient counterculture.

== Criticism ==
Answering a question after delivering a keynote address at University of Notre Dame in 2017, Alasdair MacIntyre, who according to Dreher inspired the Benedict Option, responded critically to the latter. MacIntyre characterized the 'Benedict Option' as a politically conservative movement, while describing himself as neither conservative nor liberal. He said:

The so-called 'Benedict Option' movement, insofar as it is inspired by anything to do with me is inspired by one sentence only, and people who have put it forward have apparently read nothing but that one sentence.

Explaining what he meant by that one sentence, MacIntyre stressed that it was only inadvertently that St. Benedict had founded a new social order. This new social order was largely independent of the feudal order because of a symbiotic relationship that developed between monasteries, which provided schooling and liturgy, and local communities, which provided novices, without which the order of monks would die out:

This is not a withdrawal from society into isolation of a certain sort; this is actually the creation of a new set of social institutions that then proceed to evolve [...] So, when I said we need a new St. Benedict, I was suggesting we need a new kind of engagement with the social order, not any kind of withdrawal from it.

In 2020 the American Academy of Religion's Southeast Region hosted a panel on the book in which four different scholars presented critiques of and alternatives to Dreher's "Benedict Option."

== See also ==
- New Monasticism, another Christian movement which similarly draws on After Virtue and the Christian monastic tradition
- Postliberalism
- St Benedict Patron of Europe Association
- A Canticle for Leibowitz
