= Rod Dreher =

American journalist (born 1967)

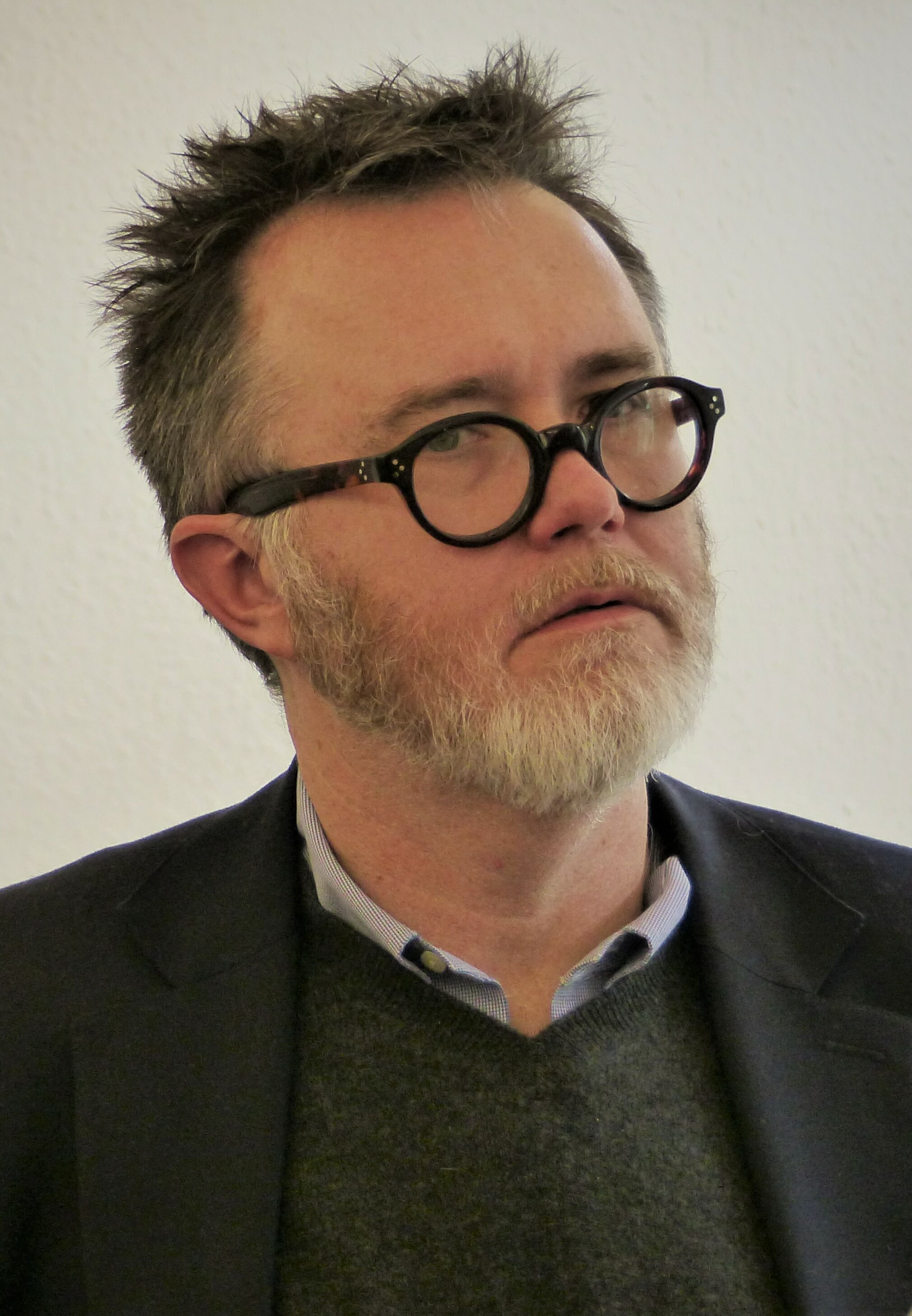
- Dreher in 2018
- Born: Ray Oliver Dreher Jr. February 14, 1967 (age 59); Baton Rouge, Louisiana, U.S.
- Education: Louisiana State University (BA)
- Occupations: Columnist, writer
- Notable work: The Benedict Option (2017)
- Spouse: Julie Harris (m. 1997; div. 2022)

Ray Oliver Dreher Jr. (Note: Pronounced /ˈdriːər/.) (born February 14, 1967), known as Rod Dreher, is an American conservative writer and editor. He was a columnist with The American Conservative for 12 years, ending in March 2023, and remains an editor-at-large there. He is also the author of several books, including How Dante Can Save Your Life, The Benedict Option, and Live Not by Lies. He has written about religion, politics, film, and culture in National Review and National Review Online, The Weekly Standard, The Wall Street Journal, and other publications.

Dreher was a film reviewer for the South Florida Sun-Sentinel and chief film critic for the New York Post. His commentaries have been broadcast on NPR's All Things Considered, and he has appeared on CNN, Fox News, MSNBC, Court TV, and other television networks.

== Early life and education ==
Dreher was born on February 14, 1967, in Baton Rouge, Louisiana. He was named after his father, Ray Oliver Dreher, a local landowner, parish sanitation official, and member of the Ku Klux Klan.

Dreher was raised in the small town of St. Francisville, the parish seat of West Feliciana Parish north of Baton Rouge. He attended the Louisiana School for Math, Science and the Arts in Natchitoches, where he was part of the school's first graduating class in 1985. In 1989 he graduated with a Bachelor of Arts in journalism from Louisiana State University.

== Career ==
Dreher began his career as a television critic for The Washington Times and later worked as chief film critic for the New York Post and editor for National Review. In 2002, Dreher wrote an essay that explored a subcategory of American conservatism he defined as "granola conservatism", whose adherents he called "crunchy cons". He defined these people as traditionalist conservatives who believe in environmental conservation, frugal living, and the preservation of traditional family values, but are also skeptical about aspects of free-market capitalism. He portrayed "crunchy cons" as generally religious (typically traditionalist Roman Catholics, conservative Protestants, or Eastern Orthodox). Four years later, Dreher published a book expanding on the themes of this manifesto, Crunchy Cons: How Birkenstocked Burkeans, Gun-Loving Organic Gardeners, Evangelical Free-Range Farmers, Hip Homeschooling Mamas, Right-Wing Nature Lovers, and Their Diverse Tribe of Countercultural Conservatives Plan to Save America (or At Least the Republican Party).

From 2006, Dreher maintained a Beliefnet blog called "Crunchy Con"; the blog was renamed "Rod Dreher" in 2010, with a shift in focus from political to cultural topics. During this time, Dreher worked as an editorial writer and columnist for The Dallas Morning News, which he left in 2009 to become the publications director for the John Templeton Foundation. On August 20, 2011, Dreher announced on Twitter that he was leaving the Templeton Foundation to return to full-time writing. In 2013, Dreher published The Little Way of Ruthie Leming, a book about his childhood in Louisiana and his sister's battle with cancer. In 2015, Dreher published How Dante Can Save Your Life, a memoir about how reading Dante's Divine Comedy helped him after his sister's death. Dreher began writing a blog for the American Conservative in 2008; in 2017, the blog received on average more than a million page views per month.

In March 2023, funding for Dreher's blog at The American Conservative was withdrawn. According to Vanity Fair, the departure was prompted by a withdrawal of support for Dreher by philanthropist Howard Ahmanson Jr., who single-handedly funded Dreher's salary at the website in an unusual arrangement that also allowed Dreher to publish without an editor. Ahmanson had become dissatisfied with the tone of Dreher's posts, calling them "too weird", citing as the prime example a post where Dreher reminisced about a Black elementary-school classmate of his who had an unusual-looking uncircumcised penis that Dreher described as a "primitive root wiener". Dreher said he intended to continue blogging and might also contribute to The American Conservative with editorial oversight.

=== The Benedict Option ===
From 2015 to 2021 Dreher wrote about what he calls the "Benedict Option", the idea that Christians who want to preserve their faith should segregate themselves to some degree from "post-Obergefell" society, which he sees as drifting further away from "traditional Christian values" (particularly those regarding sex, marriage, and gender). Dreher says that Christians should try to form intentional communities, such as the Bruderhof Communities or the School for Conversion. The phrase "Benedict Option" was inspired by Alasdair MacIntyre's 1981 book After Virtue and refers to the sixth-century monk Benedict of Nursia. Dreher's book on the subject, The Benedict Option, was published by Sentinel in 2017.

Reviews of The Benedict Option ranged from laudatory to highly critical. David Brooks of The New York Times called it "the most discussed and most important religious book of the decade" while also expressing concern that "by retreating to neat homogeneous monocultures, most separatists will end up [...] fostering narrowness, prejudice and moral arrogance." Rowan Williams, the former Archbishop of Canterbury, wrote that the prominence the book gives to "same-sex relations", as opposed to "poverty, racism and war", "reinforces the common perception that the only ethical issues that interest traditional Christians are those involving sexual matters." Nonetheless, Williams suggested, "The book is worth reading because it poses some helpfully tough questions to a socially liberal majority, as well as to believers of a more traditional colour." Russell D. Moore, the editor-in-chief of Christianity Today, called Dreher's book "brilliant, prophetic, and wise". Alan Levinovitz, a religious scholar at James Madison University, called it "spiritual pornography" the soul of which "is not love of God; it is bitter loathing of those who do not share it." Supreme Court Justice Samuel Alito cited The Benedict Option in a court ruling in favor of the freedom of hiring by two religious schools on July 8, 2020.

Various conferences and symposia have discussed the Benedict Option as an idea, as have theologians and commentators. The Reformed philosophical theologian James K. A. Smith, for instance, has written a number of critical responses to the idea, including one in which he argues that the world Dreher laments the loss of "tends to be white. And what seems to be lost is a certain default power and privilege." Dreher has repeatedly called these charges "motivated reasoning". The writer Elizabeth Bruenig has argued that Dreher's strategy of "withdrawing from conventional politics is difficult to parse with Christ's command that we love our neighbors". The Christian literary scholar Alan Jacobs has responded to these and other criticisms of The Benedict Option. The writer Leah Libresco has published a guide to the practical aspects of building "BenOp communities".

Dreher's experience as a 2021 fellow at Hungary's Danube Institute and his observation of Viktor Orbán's government persuaded him that Christian conservatives could still win and wield substantial political power. "Orbán was so unafraid, so unapologetic about using his political power to push back on the liberal élites in business and media and culture", Dreher told The New Yorker's Andrew Marantz in 2022. "It was so inspiring: this is what a vigorous conservative government can do if it's serious about stemming this horrible global tide of wokeness." Dreher also argued that the U.S. Republican Party needs "a leader with Orbán's vision—someone who can build on what Trumpism accomplished, without the egomania and inattention to policy, and who is not afraid to step on the liberals' toes."

== Political views ==
=== Views on sexuality, sexual assault, and gender ===
Dreher holds to what he calls biblical Christian teaching on sexuality and gender, including on the sinfulness of same-sex sexual relations and the naturalness of male–female difference. Some writers have praised Dreher's insights into the nature of the social changes caused by the sexual revolution; others have argued that Dreher has not sufficiently grappled with the problem of how conservative Christians should live alongside gay people, and have criticized the language Dreher has used to describe them. Dreher has published numerous articles expressing alarm at the growing visibility of transgender people in American society, which he sees as part of a "technology-driven revolution in our view of personhood." The Guardian has called Dreher "a man who appears to view fomenting transgender panic more as a vocation than a job."

In September 2018, during Brett Kavanaugh's U.S. Supreme Court confirmation hearing, Dreher sided with those conservatives who minimized the importance of an alleged sexual assault by Kavanaugh when he was 17. He tweeted: "I do not understand why the loutish drunken behavior of a 17 year old high school boy has anything to tell us about the character of a 53 year old judge."

=== Views on race and immigration ===
In a 2014 blog post titled "Tips for Not Getting Shot by Cops," Dreher wrote that Michael Brown was shot by police in part because Brown was a "lawbreaker" who "hung out with lawbreakers", although "None of this means that Wilson was justified in using deadly force against Brown" and "it doesn't mean that there aren't big problems with policing in Ferguson."

Dreher is a critic of large-scale immigration to the U.S. and Europe; he has defended the concept of Western civilization and condemned identity politics associated with race. In 2001, Dreher published an article mocking the funeral celebrations of the African-American singer Aaliyah, and subsequently reported receiving threatening phone calls from people with "black accents". He later expressed regret for his comments on the funeral. In 2018, Dreher compared African immigration to Europe to a "barbarian invasion". After the Christchurch mosque shootings of March 2019, Dreher strongly condemned the shooter's actions and aspects of his ideology, but also said the shooter had "legitimate, realistic concerns" about "declining numbers of ethnic Europeans" in Western countries; as a result of these comments, multiple scholars criticized the University of Wollongong's Ramsay Center for Western Civilization for inviting Dreher as a speaker. Dreher has said that his concerns about immigration stem from sympathy for the less well-off, whom he argues are most adversely affected by it, and by a desire to preserve Western cultural traditions.

In 2018, Dreher attracted criticism for his qualified defense of Donald Trump's comments about "shithole countries" (he defended the content of the comments while criticizing their vulgarity), and in particular for his suggestion that readers would object to section 8 housing being built in their neighborhoods because "you don't want the destructive culture of the poor imported into your neighborhood." In response to those remarks, Sarah Jones of The New Republic said Dreher had a "race problem." Her article also referred to Dreher's comments on Jean Raspail's 1973 novel The Camp of the Saints. Dreher strongly criticized the novel's use of derogatory language to describe non-Westerners and called the book bad, both aesthetically and morally, but he also referred to the "valuable" and "prophetic" lessons that can be drawn from it, including from Raspail's argument, which Dreher presents as potentially correct, that "the only way to defend Western civilization from these invaders [non-Western immigrants] is to be willing to shed their blood." He also drew parallels between the migrant crisis the book describes and contemporary immigration to Europe and the United States. Dreher replied to Jones by calling her a "social justice warrior" and "propagandist." Dreher's comments on section 8 housing were defended by the columnist Damon Linker, who wrote: "Every time a wealthy liberal enclave takes a NIMBY position on affordable housing, it shows he [Dreher] has a point about the need for greater honesty on these issues".

=== Views on international affairs ===
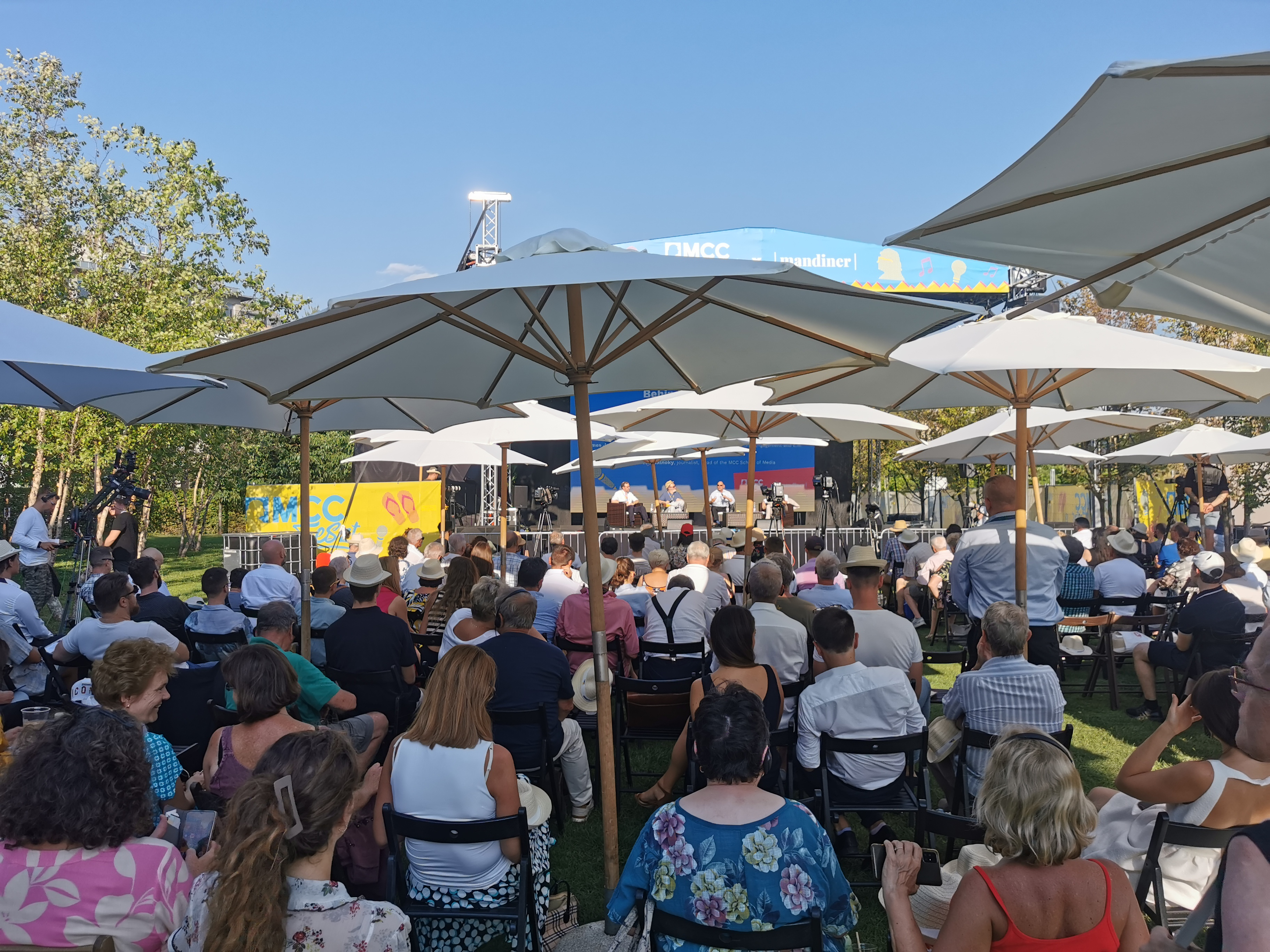
Behind the Scenes of Cultural War - panel with Gladden Pappin, James Jay Carafano, Boris Kálnoky

Dreher has been a consistent critic of the role of Islam in international affairs, but has shifted in his view of the efficacy of foreign military interventions. After the September 11 attacks, he published numerous articles critical of Islam, including one in which he praised the anti-Islamic Italian writer Oriana Fallaci's anti-Islamic book The Rage and the Pride as containing "much truth" to "shock awake a noble civilization hypnotized by multiculturalist mumbo-jumbo"; he also noted that the book contained a "few ugly parts". In 2002, Dreher called the assassinated Dutch politician Pim Fortuyn a "martyr in the war on political correctness." Dreher supported the Iraq War in 2003, but later came to believe that the invasion was a mistake; he now supports non-interventionist foreign policy. He was critical of President Trump's decision to order missile strikes in Syria in April 2017.

Dreher has expressed support for various conservative and neo-nationalist governments and parties in Europe. He has praised the French Front National politician Marion Maréchal. He has written that although Francisco Franco and his regime were not "without sin", he is "glad that Franco won" the Spanish Civil War, due to the Red Terror carried out by the Second Spanish Republic. In 2020, Dreher attended a conference of nationalist politicians and thinkers in Rome that included Orbán, Maréchal, and Giorgia Meloni.

=== Views on Hungary and Viktor Orbán ===
Dreher has written supportively of the government of Hungary's Prime Minister Viktor Orbán, whom Dreher first met at a religious-liberty conference in Budapest in 2019. In 2021, Dreher was given a paid fellowship by the Danube Institute, a conservative think tank based in Budapest and funded by Orbán's government. While many international observers believe that Orbán's premiership eroded democracy, human rights, an independent judiciary, press freedom, and the rule of law in Hungary, Dreher commented, "I was there about ten days before I realized that eighty, ninety per cent of the American narrative about the country just isn't true." Observing Orbán's government, Dreher found "so inspiring ... what a vigorous conservative government can do if it's serious about stemming this horrible global tide of wokeness." Dreher identified as instructive for U.S. conservatives Orbán's belief "in national sovereignty, not globalism. He's not opposed to transnational alliances and organizations, but he believes that it's important for people to keep and defend their own traditions and ways of life. That entails controlling immigration." Of Orbán's anti-LGBT+ policies, Dreher said, "We are living, right now, through an ongoing societal catastrophe with gender confusion and transgenderism. Viktor Orbán wants to save his nation from this ideological toxin and does not hesitate to use the power of the state to do so, even if it might violate the spirit of liberalism." In a 2014 speech, Orbán said, "The new state that we are building in Hungary is an illiberal state." Comparing dynamics in Hungary to those in the US, Dreher said, "We all seem to be barreling towards a future that is not liberal and democratic but is going to be either left illiberalism, or right illiberalism. If that's true, then I know which side I'm on: the side that isn't going to persecute me and my people."

Dreher has played a key role in encouraging the American conservative movement to engage with Hungary and look toward Orbán's political strategy and governance as a model. In April 2021, Dreher invited Tucker Carlson, whom Dreher considered "the most important conservative figure in America" at the time, to visit Hungary. After Carlson replied that he was already considering a visit but that the trip had become entangled in red tape, Dreher spoke to Hungarian government ministers and one of Orbán's closest advisers to assure them that "Tucker was somebody who could be trusted." Carlson subsequently spent a week in Hungary taping episodes of his Fox News series Tucker Carlson Tonight, during which he interviewed Orbán and praised him as the only elected leader who "publicly identifies as a Western-style conservative." In May 2022, the American Conservative Union hosted its first conference in Europe, CPAC Hungary, in Budapest. Dreher attended.

Dreher has said that the U.S. Republican Party needs "a leader with Orbán's vision", and has written favorably about American candidates and elected officials whose words and actions echo Orbán's. Dreher spoke with Andrew Marantz of The New Yorker, and was quoted in Marantz's 2022 article: "Seeing what JD Vance is saying, and what Ron DeSantis is actually doing in Florida, the concept of American Orbánism starts to make sense. I don't want to overstate what they'll be able to accomplish, given the constitutional impediments and all, but DeSantis is already using the power of the state to push back against woke capitalism, against the crazy gender stuff." By contrast, Dreher's close friend and conservative writer Andrew Sullivan has spoken critically of U.S. conservatives' admiration for Orbán: "If these people think the extreme left is hijacking American society in dangerous ways, then, yes, I agree. ... But to go from that to 'Let's embrace this authoritarian leader in this backwater European country, and maybe try out a version of that model with our own charismatic leader back home'—I mean, that leap is just weird, and frankly stupid."

=== Political endorsements ===
In 2008, 2012 and 2016, Dreher declined to endorse a candidate for president.

In the 2015 and 2019 Louisiana gubernatorial elections, Dreher voted for Democrat John Bel Edwards, citing his views on abortion, guns, and economics.

On November 1, 2020, Dreher recommended that "unsafe state readers" of his blog vote for Donald Trump, while noting that he planned to vote for the American Solidarity Party because his state is already "safely in Trump's hands." In October 2020, Dreher tweeted that the American Solidarity Party enabled him, for the first time, to vote "for a party [he] actually [believes] in." He also later said on MSNBC's Morning Joe that he is a supporter of the American Solidarity Party, and on the same day published an article endorsing Brian T. Carroll of the American Solidarity Party. In 2024, Dreher told a Hungarian news outlet he voted for Trump in 2020 and intended to do so in 2024.

== Postliberalism ==
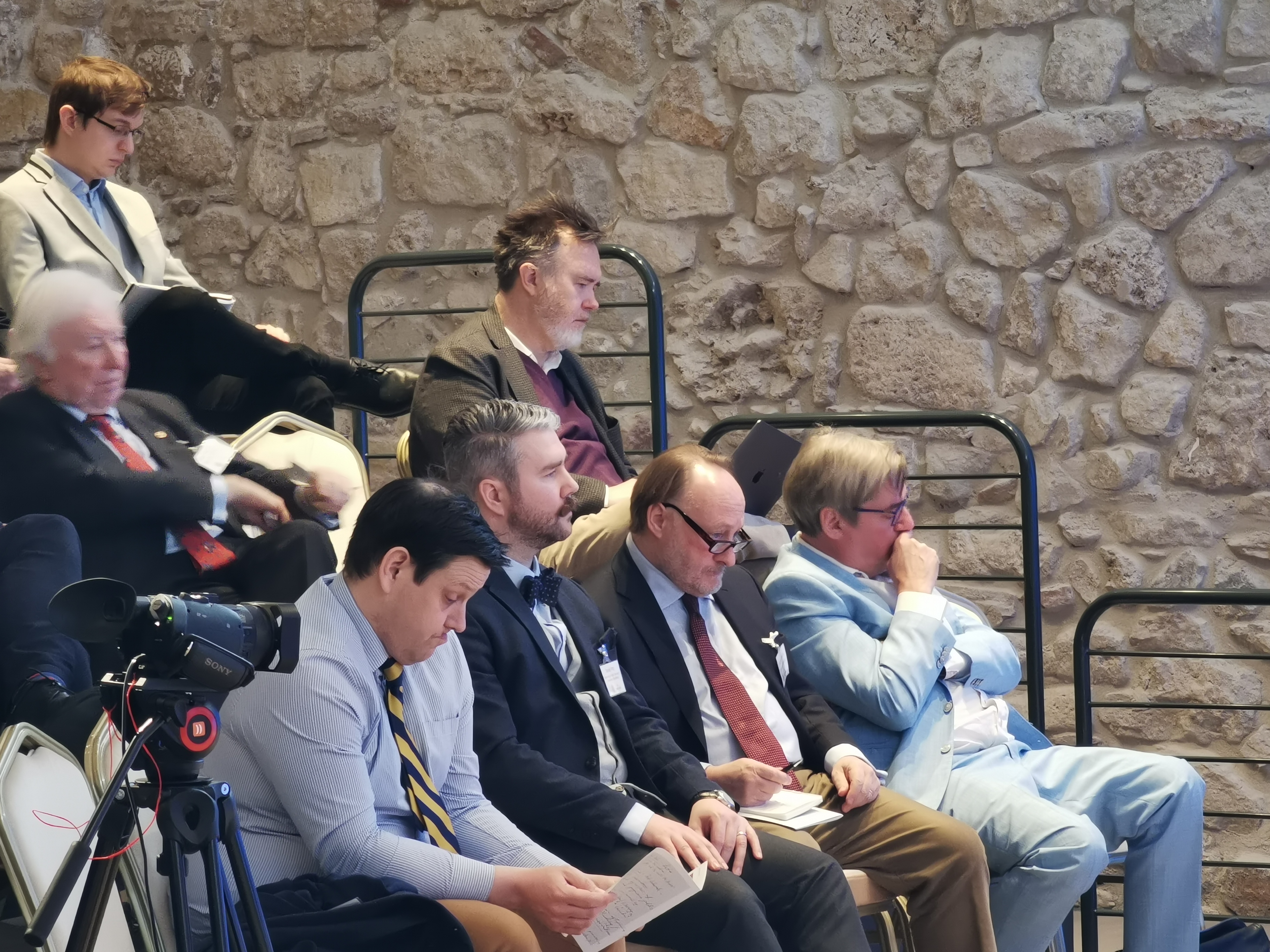
The Post-Liberal Turn and the Future of British Conservatism – Budapest

Dreher has been associated with a recent political movement that has been variously called "postliberalism", "anti-liberalism", "national conservatism", or "the new nationalism." The movement has been defined in connection with "Against the Dead Consensus", a manifesto published in First Things in March 2019, to which Dreher was a signatory and which argues that the "pre-Trump conservative consensus failed to retard, much less reverse, the eclipse of permanent truths, family stability, [and] communal solidarity" and "too often bowed to a poisonous and censorious multiculturalism"; it argues for a conservatism of national, communal, and familial solidarity. The movement's critics have compared its proponents to the intellectual defenders of fascism in the 1930s, while those sympathetic to the movement have argued that "there is nothing shameful about love of one's own, the impulse that links individual self-regard and love of family to affection for one's own neighborhood, town or city, state, and political community as a whole (the nation)."

== Controversies ==
In the early 2010s, Dreher involved himself in a controversy surrounding Jonah Paffhausen, then serving as the primate of the Orthodox Church in America (OCA), who had encountered resistance in his attempts to involve the OCA more heavily in political issues, such as abortion and gay marriage. Dreher started an anonymous website called OCA Truth, which published alleged private information about an opponent in the controversy. Dreher's connection to the website was exposed when emails connected to the website were leaked. Dreher later called his involvement in the affair "foolish".

In May 2017, Dreher published, without context, remarks of Texas A&M University professor Tommy Curry, quoting a single sentence to misleadingly suggest that Curry had incited violence against white people. Curry was subsequently subjected to a wave of racist abuse and intimidation. Dreher said he had not sought comment from Curry before publishing his blog post, and Curry received the support of his faculty colleagues and university president.

In January 2020, Dreher was named in a lawsuit brought by the parents of Kayla Kenney, a 15-year-old girl whose private Instagram images he posted to his blog allegedly without parental permission, and against whom he made allegations of sexual harassment, based on anonymous sources, that Kenney and her family denied. The lawsuit accuses Dreher of defamation, intentional infliction of emotional distress, and invasion of privacy. In his article, Dreher wrote that Kenney, who had been expelled from a Christian school, had boasted of having had lesbian sex, and quoted sources as saying that she had tried to promote LGBTQ+ politics to her classmates. He also wrote that she had admittedly violated school policy many times.

== Personal life ==
Dreher married Julie Harris Dreher in 1997. Dreher announced publicly through his blog the couple had begun the divorce process in April 2022. The couple had three children together. Dreher lived in East Baton Rouge Parish, Louisiana. Raised a Methodist, he left organized religion before converting to Roman Catholicism in 1993 at the age of 26, and subsequently wrote widely in the Catholic press. Covering the Catholic Church's sex abuse scandal, starting in 2001, led him to question his Catholicism, and on October 12, 2006, he announced his conversion to Eastern Orthodoxy. At the time, Dreher had argued that the scandal was not so much a "pedophile problem," but that the "sexual abuse of minors is facilitated by a secret, powerful network of gay priests," known as the "Lavender Mafia."

In 2022, after separating from his wife, Dreher moved to Budapest, Hungary, where he lived in what he called self-imposed exile. He returned to the United States in 2026, after Orbán was voted out of office.

Dreher wrote that FBI documents uncovered in 2022 named his father Ray Dreher as a leader (Exalted Cyclops) of the Ku Klux Klan, a revelation Dreher called "proof of a terrible story that I had long suspected was true, but hoped against hope was not." Ray Dreher Sr. and his brother, Murphy Dreher Jr., were close to local U.S. Representative and noted Klansman John Rarick; all three men belonged to the same Masonic lodge.

== Bibliography ==
=== Books ===
- Dreher, Rod (2006). Crunchy Cons: How Birkenstocked Burkeans, Gun-Loving Organic Gardeners, Evangelical Free-Range Farmers, Hip Homeschooling Mamas, Right-Wing Nature Lovers, and Their Diverse Tribe of Countercultural Conservatives Plan to Save America (Or at Least the Republican Party). New York: Crown Forum. ISBN 9781400050642.
- — (2013). The Little Way of Ruthie Leming: A Southern Girl, a Small Town, and the Secret of a Good Life. New York: Grand Central Publishing. ISBN 9781455521913.
- — (2015). How Dante Can Save Your Life: The Life-Changing Wisdom of History's Greatest Poem. New York: Regan Arts. ISBN 9781941393321.
- — (2017). The Benedict Option: A Strategy for Christians in a Post-Christian Nation. New York: Sentinel. ISBN 9780735213319.
- — (2020). Live Not by Lies: A Manual for Christian Dissidents. New York: Sentinel. ISBN 9780593087398.
- — (2025). Living in Wonder: Finding Mystery and Meaning in a Secular Age. Grand Rapids: Zondervan. ISBN 9780310369127.

=== Essays ===
- Dreher, Rod (April 22, 2002). "The Gay Question: Amid the Catholic Church's current scandals, an unignorable issue." National Review.
- — (September 30, 2002). "Crunchy Cons: Picking up organic vegetables in your National Review tote bag." National Review.
- — (June 10, 2010). "Orthodoxy and Me." Journey to Orthodoxy.
- — (June 26, 2015). "Orthodox Christians Must Now Learn To Live as Exiles in Our Own Country." Time Magazine.

== See also ==
- Resident Aliens
