= Clear Creek Abbey =

Roman Catholic monastery in Oklahoma, United States

Abbey of Our Lady of the Annunciation of Clear Creek
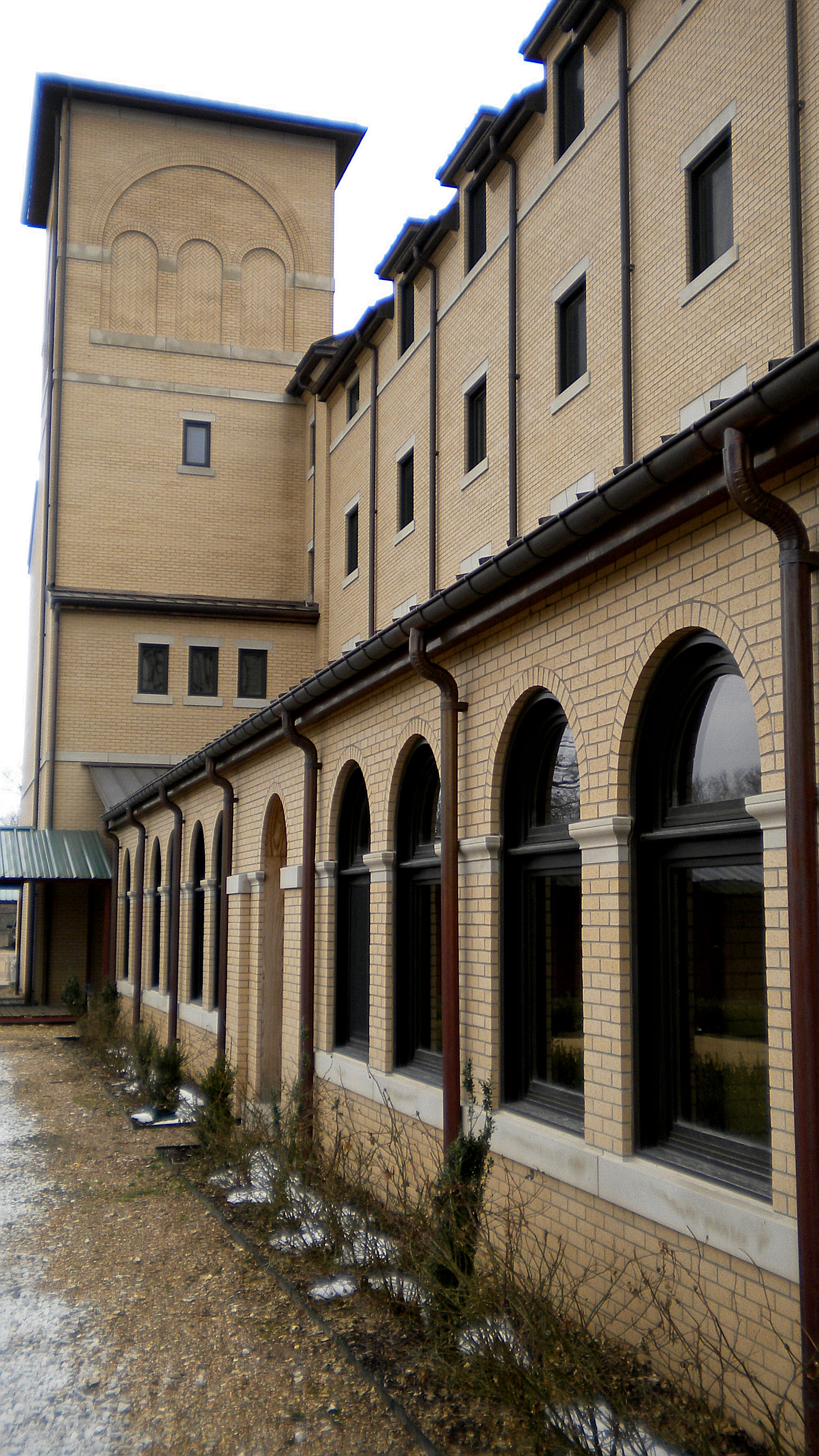
- A completed section of the monastic compound.

- Location within Oklahoma Location within the United States

Monastery information
- Other name: Clear Creek Abbey
- Order: Benedictine
- Established: 1999
- Mother house: Abbey of Our Lady of the Assumption
- Dedication: Our Lady of the Annunciation
- Diocese: Tulsa

People
- Founder: Dom Philip Anderson
- Abbot: Dom Philip Anderson

Site
- Location: Hulbert, Oklahoma
- Coordinates: 36.033852°N 95.195836°W
- Website: www.clearcreekmonks.org

Our Lady of the Annunciation of Clear Creek Abbey or Clear Creek Abbey is a Benedictine Abbey in the Ozark Mountains near Hulbert in Cherokee County, Oklahoma. It is located in the Diocese of Tulsa.

== Origins ==
The monastery traces its roots to the Abbey of Fontgombault in France. Thirty-one American Catholic men, seeking to live the full Benedictine life, went to Abbey of Our Lady of the Assumption at Fontgombault, France, which is a monastery of the Solesmes Congregation.

In 1999, seven of these men, now monks from Fontgombault, along with six other monks from Canada and France, established a community near Hulbert, Oklahoma at the invitation of Bishop Edward James Slattery. Clear Creek is the second monastery of the Solesmes Congregation established in the United States; the first is a house of nuns at Westfield, Vermont. The monastery is being built in phases, and until the church is finished, Masses are said in the crypt.

== Abbey Community ==
In February 2010, Clear Creek Abbey gained abbatial status. It uses the 1962 Roman Missal (Tridentine Mass). The choir is well known for its Gregorian chant. Its first abbot, as of 2010, is Dom Philip Anderson, who had been the prior since the monastery's founding. He has said, “We just follow the old monastic life. We pray, worship and do manual labor and give counseling to people... There's a whole culture war going on and a series of disappointments with the Catholic Church in America. People look to this monastery as a new beginning, as a new element that has a solid backing in a long tradition of monastic life.”

Clear Creek is now actively recruiting to its full capacity of 60-70 monks. As of 2003, there were 22 monks, while by 2013, there were over 40. Clear Creek currently houses 60 monks, and in recent years, a community of dozens of lay families have started to gather around the abbey.

The monastery is also actively fundraising, having raised $4 million (as of 2003) of a target of $32 million. After a large gift was received in 2009, construction on the church moved forward in 2011. The west façade, the nave, and the transept were raised to half their planned height. A roof was put over this new structure, allowing for its use as a church. In 2013, schematic architectural plans for the remaining buildings were completed. A contract for construction of the church’s eastern portion, or chevet, was signed on March 10, 2016.

== See also ==
- List of communities using the Tridentine Mass
