= Triors Abbey =

Monastery in Châtillon-Saint-Jean, France

Coordinates: 45°5′39″N 5°6′47″E

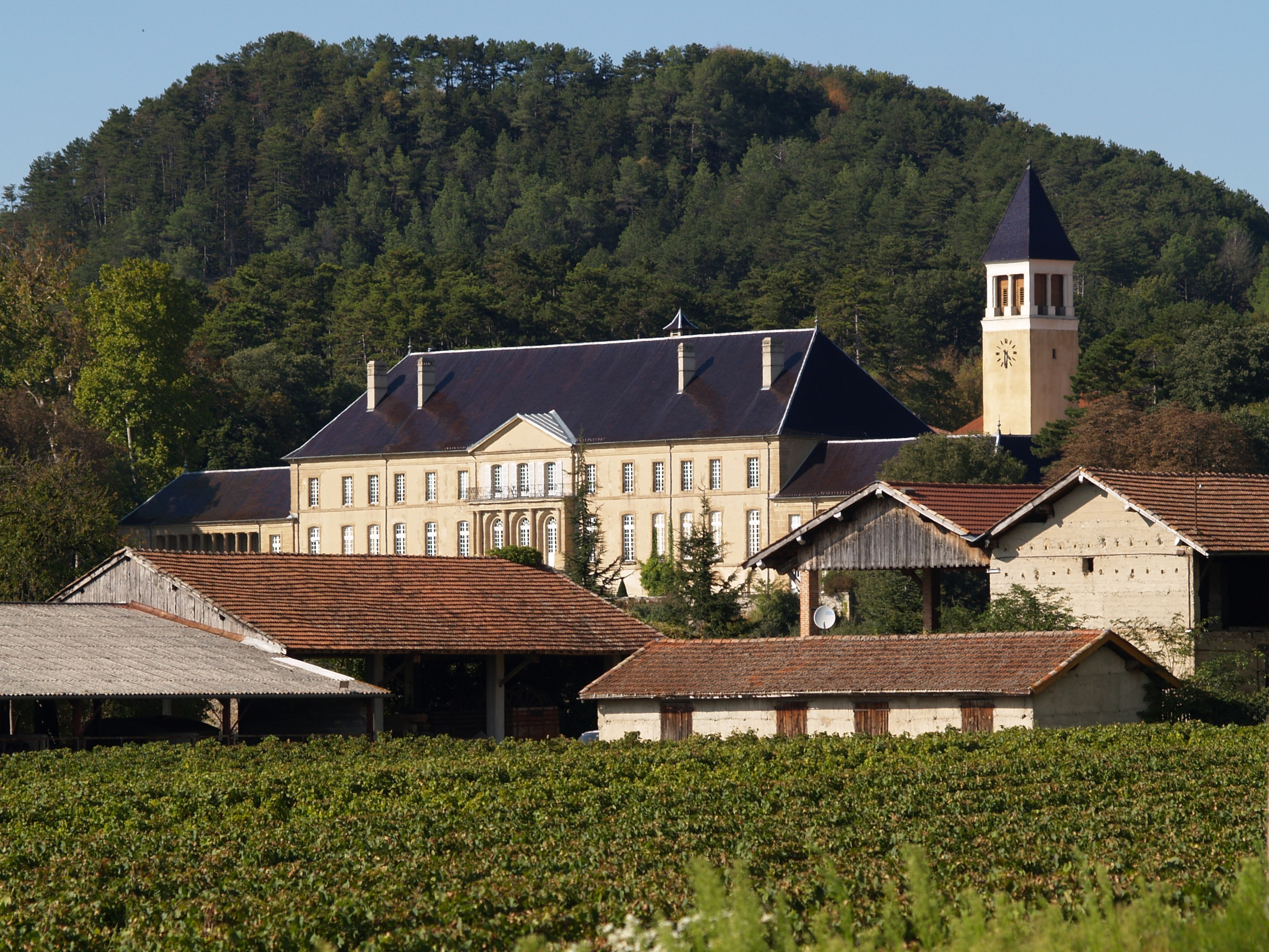
Triors Abbey

Triors Abbey (French: Abbaye de Notre-Dame de Triors) is a Benedictine monastery located in Châtillon-Saint-Jean in the Drôme, Rhône-Alpes, France.

It was founded in 1984 as a priory of Fontgombault Abbey in an 18th-century château bequeathed to the monks for that purpose. Major building took place from 1990. Triors was raised to the status of an independent abbey in 1994. The first abbot was Dom Hervé Courau, who continues in the post. The community, as of 2008, numbers about 40.

It is part of the Solesmes Congregation of the Benedictine Confederation and as such focusses on Gregorian chant. As of 2008, plans are in hand to produce commercial recordings of Gregorian chants covering the entire liturgical year.

The liturgy is celebrated according to the extraordinary form of the Roman Rite (Tridentine Mass).

Triors Abbey is the seat of St Benedict Patron of Europe Association.

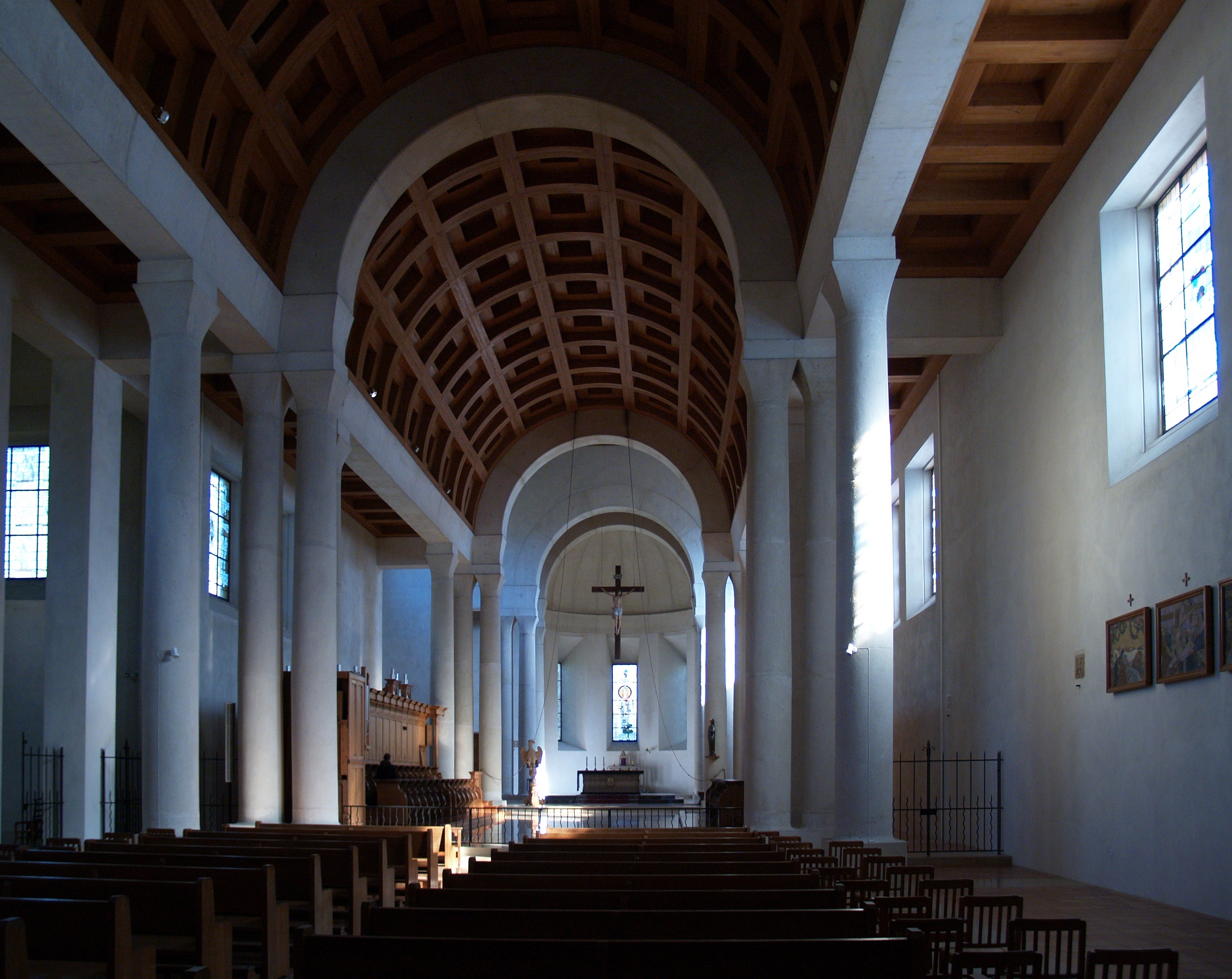
Abbey church: interior

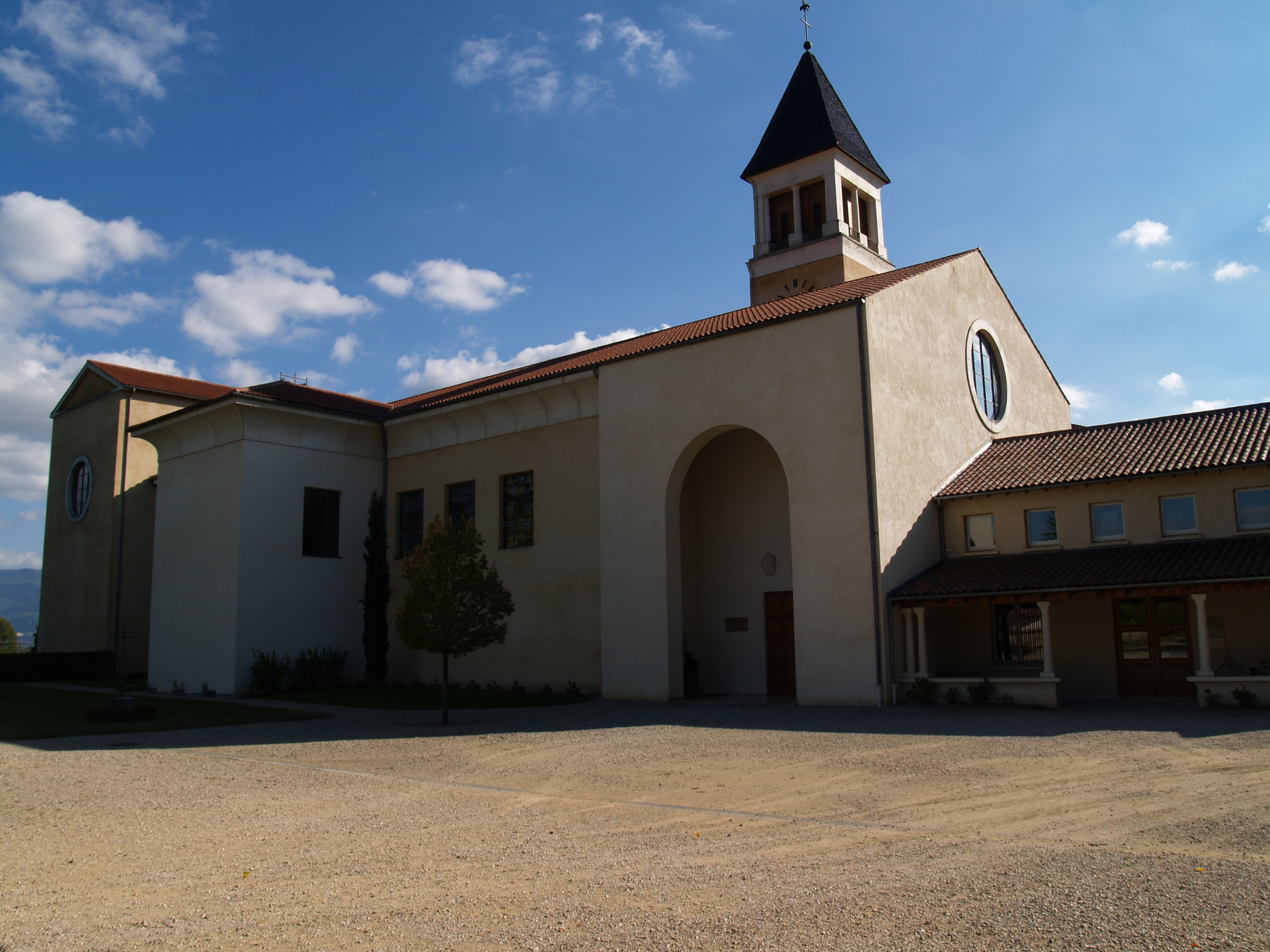
Abbey church: exterior

== Sources ==
- Official site of the Abbey of Our Lady of Triors
- Abbayes provençales: Triors (in French)
