= Randol Abbey =

Monastery in France

Coordinates: 45°38′36″N 3°4′23″E

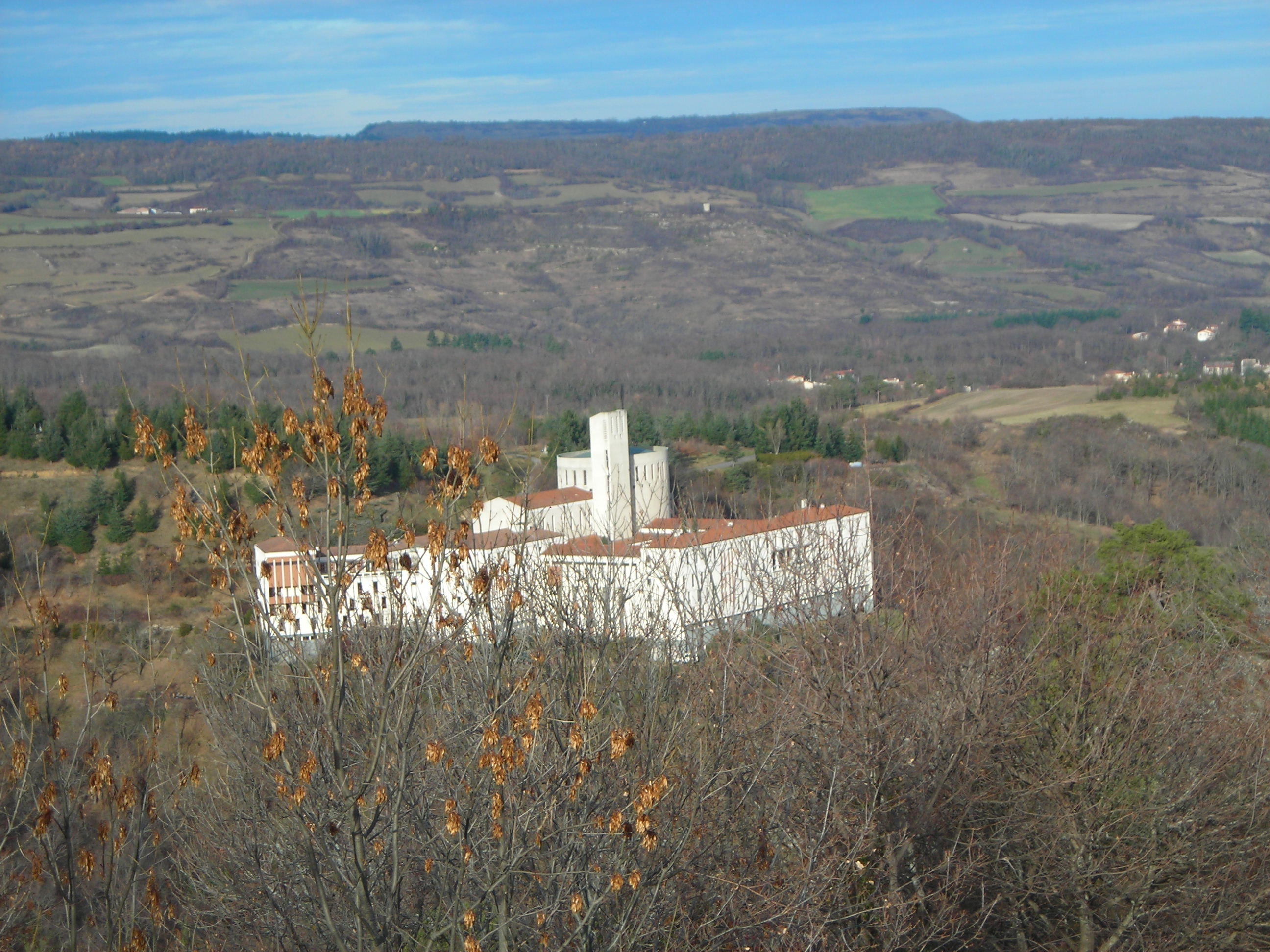
View of the abbey

Randol Abbey (Abbaye de Notre-Dame de Randol) is a Benedictine monastery situated at Randol near the village of Saint-Saturnin, Puy-de-Dôme department, in the Auvergne mountains of France.

== History ==
It was founded in 1971 as a priory of Fontgombault Abbey and was raised to the status of an independent abbey on 21 March 1981. The monastery building was constructed at the time of foundation in a striking contemporary style in a spectacular mountainside location.

It is part of the Solesmes Congregation of the Benedictine Confederation and as such focusses on Gregorian chant and the Tridentine Mass.

== Sources ==
- Randol Abbey official website (includes many images) (in French)
