= Fontgombault Abbey =

Benedictine monastery at Fontgombault, Berry, France

Coordinates: 46°40′37″N 0°58′43″E

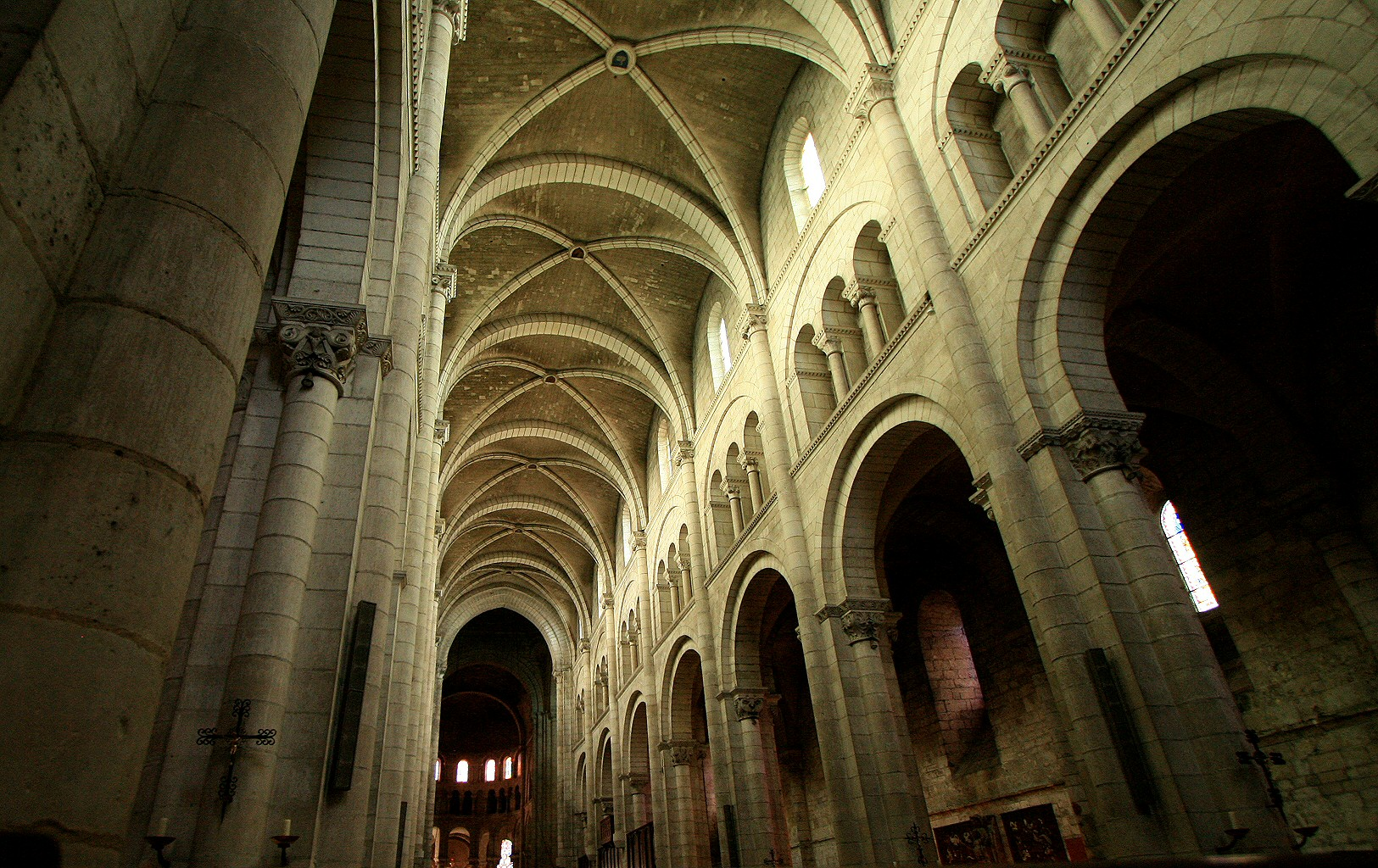
The interior of the church at Fontgombault Abbey

Fontgombault Abbey, otherwise the Abbey of Notre-Dame, Fontgombault (French: Abbaye de Fontgombault; Abbaye de Notre-Dame de Fontgombault), is a Benedictine monastery of the Solesmes Congregation located in Fontgombault in the département of Indre, in the province of Berry, France. It was built in the Romanesque architectural style. The monastery, founded in 1091, was dissolved in 1791 and refounded in 1948.

== History ==
In 1091, Pierre de l'Étoile founded a Benedictine monastery on the banks of the Creuse, near the spring or "fount" of Gombaud. In the 12th and 13th centuries, the abbey experienced vigorous growth and established about twenty priories. In the 15th century, the abbots of Fontgombault had numerous ponds dug, as was also done at the abbeys of Saint-Cyran and Méobecq, thus contributing to fish husbandry in the Brenne region of the Berry province. The abbey was sacked and laid waste by the Calvinists in 1569. It was not restored until the end of the 17th century, when Dom Andrieu accomplished the task. In 1741, the Benedictine community, reduced to five members, was replaced by a community of Lazarists, who established a seminary and used it as a center for missions in the region.

The buildings were partly destroyed during the French Revolution, when the monastery was nationalised and sold off. It was eventually bought back for religious uses in 1849 by the Trappists, who re-established it as a viable community by redeveloping its agriculture and setting up a kirsch distillery.

In 1905, the Trappists were expelled from France under the Association Laws and the monastery was secularised and sold a second time. The purchaser was Louis Bonjean, who set up a button factory in the premises. At his death in 1914, the buildings were put to use as a military hospital for wounded soldiers of the Belgian army, which it remained until 1918. The expelled Trappists went on to form the Monastery of Our Lady of Jordan, Oregon in the United States.

From 1919 to 1948, the buildings were used as a diocesan seminary, which eventually closed for lack of vocations.

== Present foundation ==
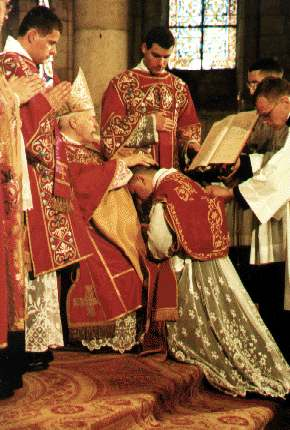
Third imposition of hands in the Abbey in 1999.

In 1948, the empty buildings were restored to the site's original purpose when 22 monks from Solesmes Abbey settled it afresh as a Benedictine community. It is now the most populous of Solesmes' foundations, with over a hundred monks, and has in its turn made three foundations in France — Randol Abbey in 1971, Triors Abbey in 1984, and Gaussan Priory in 1994 — as well as Clear Creek Abbey in the United States in 1999, which was elevated from a priory in 2010. In 2013, 13 brothers from Fontgombault transferred to the abbey of Saint-Paul de Wisques in order to strengthen the declining community.

Dom Jean Roy, Abbot of Fontgombault, was one of the founders of St Benedict Patron of Europe Association in 1967.

Mass is celebrated in Latin using the traditional pre-Vatican II rite according to the 1962 Roman Missal (Tridentine Mass).

As Benedictines of the Solesmes Congregation, Gregorian chant is at the heart of the community's liturgical practice, and recordings of the chant at Fontgombault are sold to support the community. The Abbey is near the Little Sisters Disciples of the Lamb's convent and a monk serves as their chaplain.

In 2019, the abbey saw a spate of publicity in the French media, due to holding Jean-Claude Romand before his 2022 release.
