= Jean de La Brète =

French novel writer (1858–1945)

Jean de La Brète

Jean de La Brète (pen name of Alice Cherbonnel; 1858–1945) was a pseudonymous French writer of novels for young women. Her best-known work, Mon oncle et mon curé (1889), went through several editions and was adapted to stage and screen.

== Early life ==
Alice Cherbonnel was born in Saumur, 13 December 1858 to a Norman father and a Angevin mother. She descended from a lineage of French storytellers.

== Career ==
La Brète's novels were commentaries on contemporary society. Le Roman d'une croyante, L'Impossible, and Un Mirage dealt with the religious problems that agitated France in La Brète's era. Her most popular work was Mon oncle et mon curé, the autobiography of a young girl who reveals to the reader her thoughts, dreams, and aspirations. It was awarded the Prix Montyon in 1890 by the Académie française, and was constantly republished until 1977. This novel was adapted for the cinema in 1938. Mon oncle et mon curé was considered to be a work of great educational value, cleverly and agreeably disguised as a work of fiction. It was a favorite text for schools and colleges. Elizabeth M. White adapted the book to young students, annotating freely with footnotes, and adding a series of exercises based on the text, for translation from English back into French.

La Brète's style was characterized as clear and vivid; her stories are vigorous and highly colored; her conclusions are generally shown by the plot itself rather than by a series of speeches.

== Personal life ==
In the winter, she lived in a Parisian apartment on the Boulevard des Invalides. In the summer, she lived on her estate in Anjou, an estate that belonged to her mother's family for more than a century. Her library was installed in the tower above the chapel of the manor, a description of which was contained in her Badinage. Alice Cherbonnel died in Cizay-la-Madeleine, 23 August 1945. In France, three streets bear the name of Jean de La Brète: in Saumur, in Cizay-la-Madeleine, and in Saint-Sylvain-d'Anjou.

== Awards and honours ==
- 1890 : Prix Montyon, Académie française, for Mon oncle et mon curé
- 1895 : Prix Montyon, Académie française, for Un vaincu

== Selected works ==
- 1889 : Mon oncle et mon curé (text)

- 1891 : The Story of Reine, Or, My Uncle and My Curé, translated by Mrs. J. W. Davis (text)

- 1890 : Le Comte de Palène (text)
- 1892 : Le Roman d'une croyante
- 1893 : Un vaincu (text)
- 1894 : Badinage (text)
- 1897 : L'Esprit souffle où il veut
- 1897 : L'Imagination fait le reste
- 1900 : La Solution
- 1903 : Conte bleu
- 1904 : Un réveil
- 1905 : L'Impossible
- 1906 : Un mirage
- 1908 : Illusion masculine
- 1909 : Aimer quand même
- 1910 : Vieilles Gens, Vieux Pays
- 1910 : L'Appel des souvenirs
- 1911 : Rêver et vivre
- 1911 : Âmes inconnues, notes intimes d'un séminariste [Auguste Merlet]
- 1912 : Un obstacle
- 1914 : L’Aile blessée
- 1917 : Un caractère de Française
- 1920 : Les Deux Sommets (text)
- 1923 : Le Rubis
- 1924 : La Solitaire
- 1926 : Les Reflets (text)
- 1928 : La Source enchantée
- 1930 : Une lumineuse clarté
- 1931 : Un conseil
- 1933 : Les Gardiens
- 1936 : Les Tournants
- 1938 : Frédérique ou Un caractère parisien
- 1939 : Péripéties

== Adaptations ==
=== Film ===
- 1938 : [Mon oncle et mon curé, French film directed by Pierre Caron, with André Lefaur, Annie France, Paul Cambo and René Génin

=== Theatre ===
- 1935 : Mon oncle et mon curé, comedy in 3 acts by Lucien Dabril, based on the novel of Jean de La Brète. Performed in Paris, Cercle les Jeunes des Ternes, 30 April 1935
- 1939 : La Source enchantée, comedy in 4 acts Lucien Dabril, based on the novel by La Brète. Rennes, created by the company Le Manteau d'Arlequin, 22 January 1939
