= Arrondissement of Saumur =

Coordinates: 47.27°N 0.08°W

Saumur
- Arrondissement
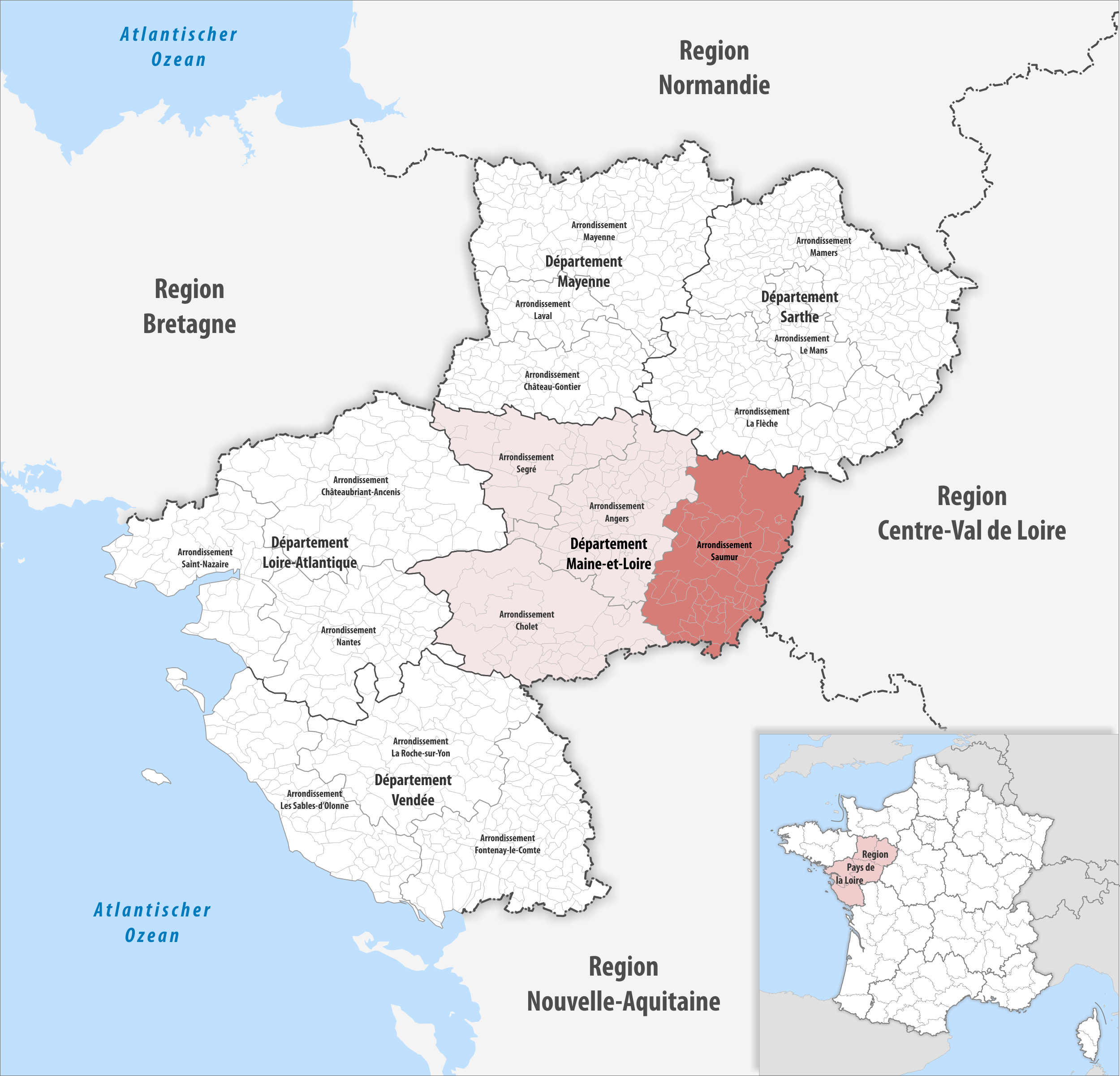
- Location within the region Pays de la Loire
- Country: France
- Region: Pays de la Loire
- Department: Maine-et-Loire
- No. of communes: {{{nbcomm}}}
- Area: 1,968.0 km^{2} (759.8 sq mi)
- Population (2023): 132,572
  - Density: 67.364/km^{2} (174.47/sq mi)
- INSEE code: 493

The arrondissement of Saumur is an arrondissement of France in the Maine-et-Loire departement in the Pays de la Loire region. It has 52 communes. Its population is 133,080 (2021), and its area is 1,968.0 km^{2} (759.8 sq mi).

== Composition ==
The communes of the arrondissement of Saumur, and their INSEE codes, are:

1. Allonnes (49002)
2. Antoigné (49009)
3. Artannes-sur-Thouet (49011)
4. Baugé-en-Anjou (49018)
5. Beaufort-en-Anjou (49021)
6. Bellevigne-les-Châteaux (49060)
7. Blou (49030)
8. Les Bois-d'Anjou (49138)
9. Brain-sur-Allonnes (49041)
10. La Breille-les-Pins (49045)
11. Brossay (49053)
12. Cizay-la-Madeleine (49100)
13. Le Coudray-Macouard (49112)
14. Courchamps (49113)
15. Courléon (49114)
16. Dénezé-sous-Doué (49121)
17. Distré (49123)
18. Doué-en-Anjou (49125)
19. Épieds (49131)
20. Fontevraud-l'Abbaye (49140)
21. Gennes-Val-de-Loire (49261)
22. La Lande-Chasles (49171)
23. Longué-Jumelles (49180)
24. Louresse-Rochemenier (49182)
25. Mazé-Milon (49194)
26. La Ménitré (49201)
27. Montreuil-Bellay (49215)
28. Montsoreau (49219)
29. Mouliherne (49221)
30. Neuillé (49224)
31. Noyant-Villages (49228)
32. Parnay (49235)
33. La Pellerine (49237)
34. Le Puy-Notre-Dame (49253)
35. Rou-Marson (49262)
36. Saint-Clément-des-Levées (49272)
37. Saint-Just-sur-Dive (49291)
38. Saint-Macaire-du-Bois (49302)
39. Saint-Philbert-du-Peuple (49311)
40. Saumur (49328)
41. Souzay-Champigny (49341)
42. Tuffalun (49003)
43. Turquant (49358)
44. Les Ulmes (49359)
45. Varennes-sur-Loire (49361)
46. Varrains (49362)
47. Vaudelnay (49364)
48. Vernantes (49368)
49. Vernoil-le-Fourrier (49369)
50. Verrie (49370)
51. Villebernier (49374)
52. Vivy (49378)

== History ==
The arrondissement of Saumur was created in 1800. At the January 2017 reorganisation of the arrondissements of Maine-et-Loire, it gained four communes from the arrondissement of Angers, and it lost two communes to the arrondissement of Angers and nine communes to the arrondissement of Cholet.

As a result of the reorganisation of the cantons of France which came into effect in 2015, the borders of the cantons are no longer related to the borders of the arrondissements. The cantons of the arrondissement of Saumur were, as of January 2015:

1. Allonnes
2. Baugé-en-Anjou
3. Doué-la-Fontaine
4. Gennes
5. Longué-Jumelles
6. Montreuil-Bellay
7. Noyant
8. Saumur-Nord
9. Saumur-Sud
10. Vihiers
