= Brain-sur-Allonnes =

- Commune
- Coat of arms
- Location of Brain-sur-Allonnes
- Location within France Location within Pays de la Loire
- Coordinates: 47°18′11″N 0°03′58″E
- Country: France
- Region: Pays de la Loire
- Department: Maine-et-Loire
- Arrondissement: Saumur
- Canton: Longué-Jumelles
- Intercommunality: CA Saumur Val de Loire

Government
  - Mayor (2020–2026): Yves Boucher
- Area^{1}: 33.32 km^{2} (12.86 sq mi)
- Elevation: 46 m (151 ft)
- Highest elevation: 111 m (364 ft)
- Lowest elevation: 23 m (75 ft)
- Population (2023): 2,056
  - Density: 61.70/km^{2} (159.8/sq mi)
- Time zone: UTC+01:00 (CET)
  - Summer (DST): UTC+02:00 (CEST)
- INSEE/Postal code: 49041 /49650
- ^{1} French Land Register data, which excludes lakes, ponds, glaciers > 1 km^{2} (0.386 sq mi or 247 acres) and river estuaries.

Brain-sur-Allonnes (French pronunciation: [bʁɛ̃ syʁ alɔn], literally Brain on Allonnes) is a commune in the Maine-et-Loire department in western France.

== Population ==
Historical population

Year	Pop.	±% p.a.
1793	1,500	—
1821	1,535	+0.08%
1846	1,533	−0.01%
1872	1,345	−0.50%
1901	1,280	−0.17%
1926	1,099	−0.61%
1946	1,146	+0.21%
1962	1,289	+0.74%
1968	1,366	+0.97%

Year	Pop.	±% p.a.
1975	1,485	+1.20%
1982	1,708	+2.02%
1990	1,801	+0.66%
1999	1,793	−0.05%
2007	1,927	+0.90%
2012	1,994	+0.69%
2017	2,003	+0.09%
2023	2,056	+0.44%

Source: EHESS and INSEE (1968-2023)

== See also ==
- Communes of the Maine-et-Loire department
