= Blou =

Blou may refer to:

== Places ==
- Blou, Maine-et-Loire, France

== Other ==
- Blou (band), Canadian band
