= Souzay-Champigny =

- Commune
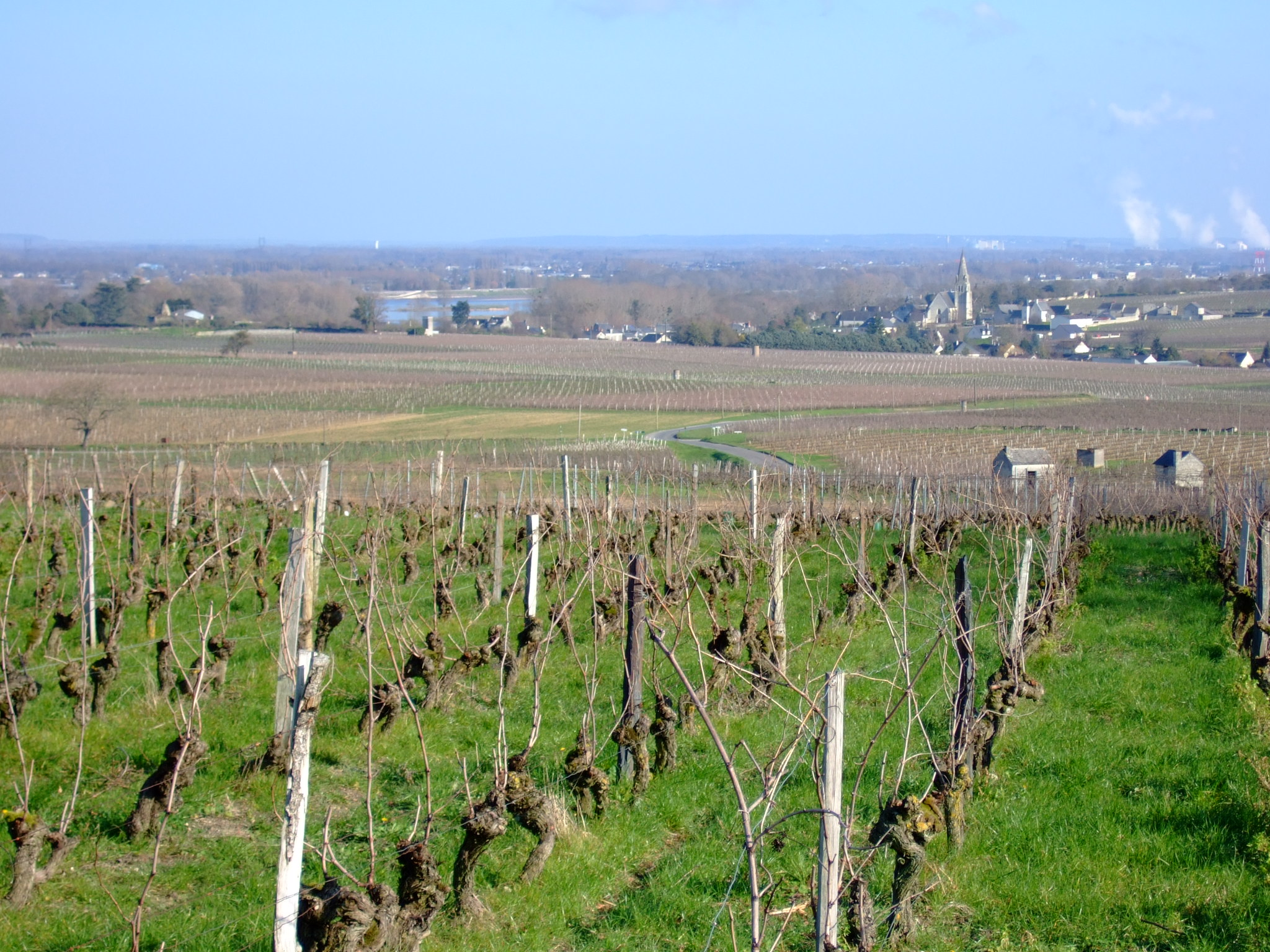
- A general view of Souzay and its vineyards
- Location of Souzay-Champigny
- Location within France Location within Pays de la Loire
- Coordinates: 47°14′10″N 0°00′25″W
- Country: France
- Region: Pays de la Loire
- Department: Maine-et-Loire
- Arrondissement: Saumur
- Canton: Saumur
- Intercommunality: CA Saumur Val de Loire

Government
  - Mayor (2024–2026): Isabelle Bonneau
- Area^{1}: 8.92 km^{2} (3.44 sq mi)
- Elevation: 32 m (105 ft)
- Highest elevation: 93 m (305 ft)
- Lowest elevation: 26 m (85 ft)
- Population (2023): 686
  - Density: 76.9/km^{2} (199/sq mi)
- Time zone: UTC+01:00 (CET)
  - Summer (DST): UTC+02:00 (CEST)
- INSEE/Postal code: 49341 /49400
- ^{1} French Land Register data, which excludes lakes, ponds, glaciers > 1 km^{2} (0.386 sq mi or 247 acres) and river estuaries.

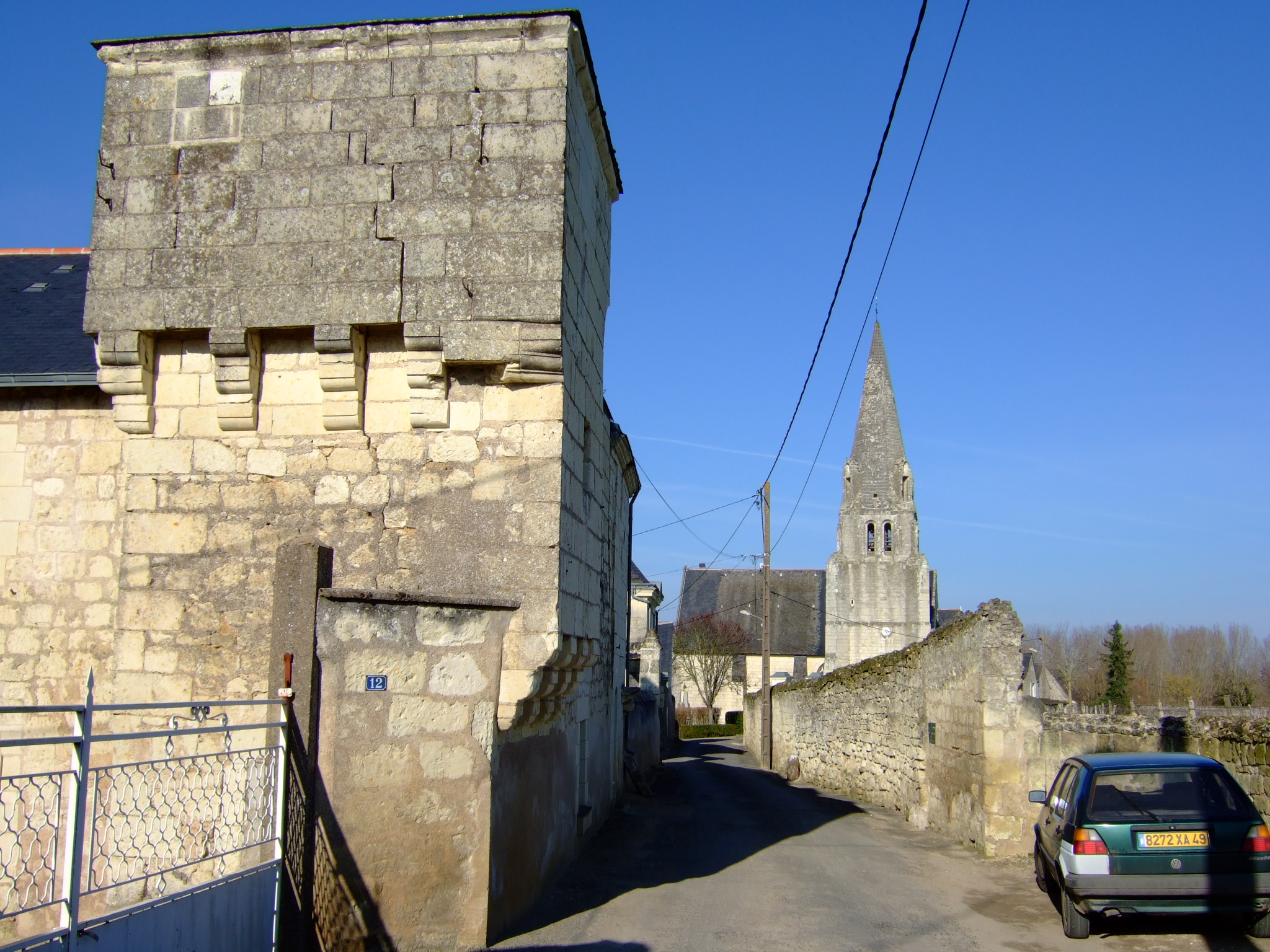

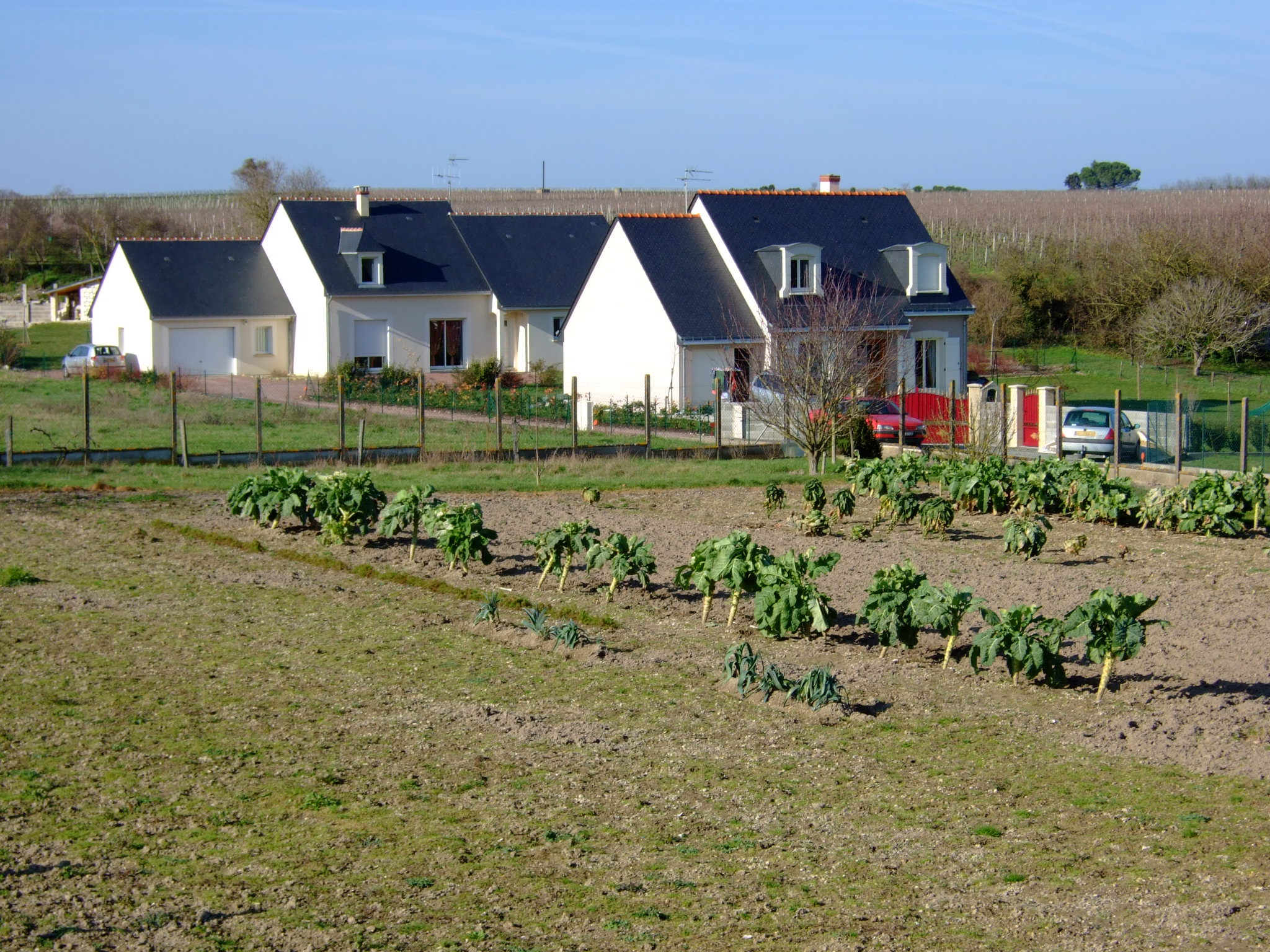
Houses in Souzay

Souzay-Champigny (French pronunciation: [suzɛ ʃɑ̃piɲi]) is a commune in the Maine-et-Loire department in western France.

== See also ==
- Communes of the Maine-et-Loire department
