= Antoigné =

- Commune
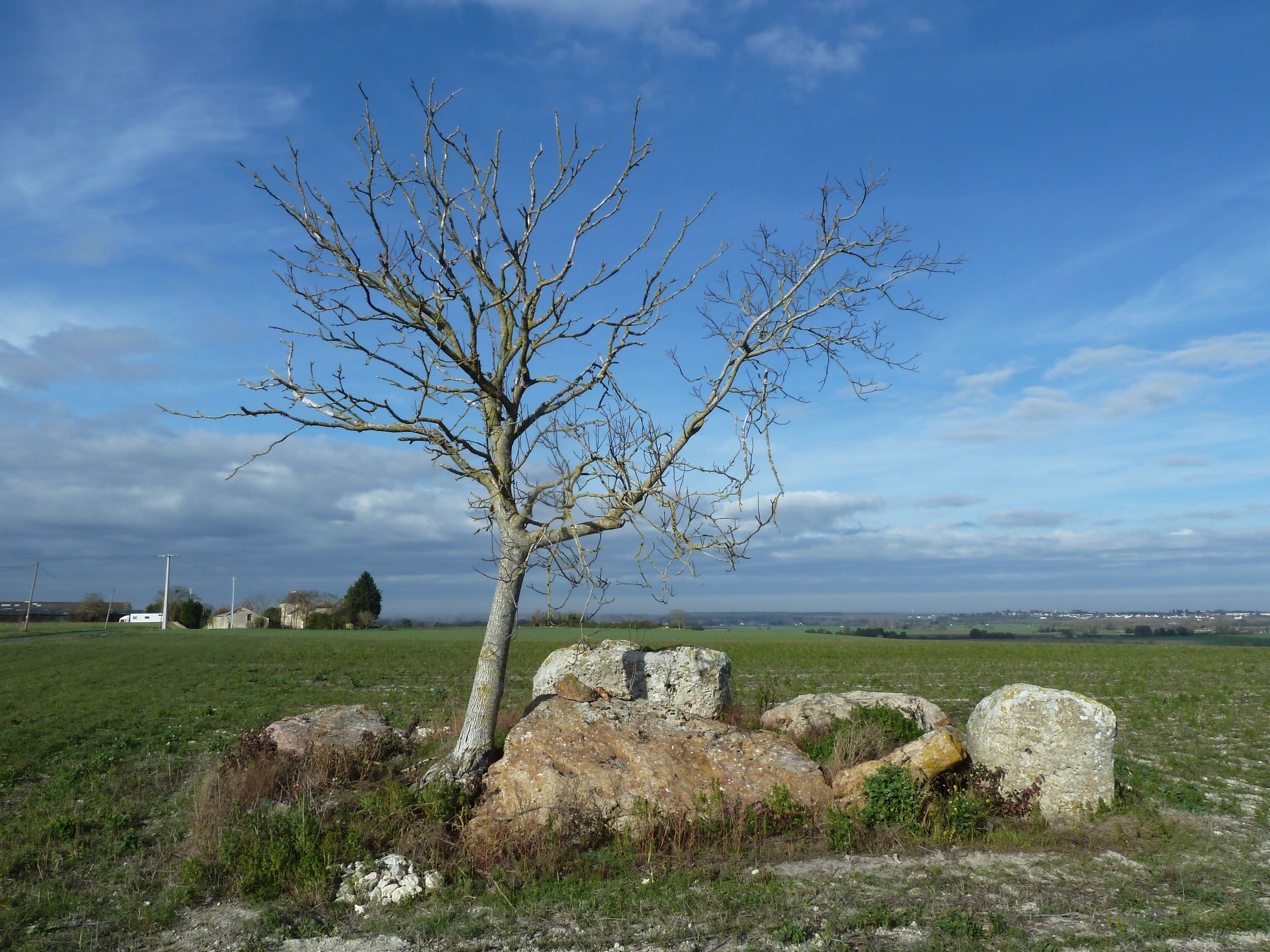
- The Dolmen du Griffier in Antoigné
- Location of Antoigné
- Location within France Location within Pays de la Loire
- Coordinates: 47°05′06″N 0°06′41″W
- Country: France
- Region: Pays de la Loire
- Department: Maine-et-Loire
- Arrondissement: Saumur
- Canton: Doué-en-Anjou
- Intercommunality: CA Saumur Val de Loire

Government
  - Mayor (2020–2026): Éric Mousserion
- Area^{1}: 17.87 km^{2} (6.90 sq mi)
- Elevation: 41 m (135 ft)
- Highest elevation: 74 m (243 ft)
- Lowest elevation: 36 m (118 ft)
- Population (2023): 441
  - Density: 24.7/km^{2} (63.9/sq mi)
- Time zone: UTC+01:00 (CET)
  - Summer (DST): UTC+02:00 (CEST)
- INSEE/Postal code: 49009 /49260
- ^{1} French Land Register data, which excludes lakes, ponds, glaciers > 1 km^{2} (0.386 sq mi or 247 acres) and river estuaries.

Antoigné (French pronunciation: [ɑ̃twaɲe]) is a commune in the Maine-et-Loire department in western France.

== Population ==
Historical population
Year	Pop.	±% p.a.
1968	471	—
1975	448	−0.71%
1982	442	−0.19%
1990	418	−0.70%
1999	414	−0.11%
2007	467	+1.52%
2012	477	+0.42%
2017	465	−0.51%
2023	441	−0.88%
Source: INSEE

== See also ==
- Communes of the Maine-et-Loire department
