= Varrains =

- Commune
- Location of Varrains
- Location within France Location within Pays de la Loire
- Coordinates: 47°13′23″N 0°03′40″W
- Country: France
- Region: Pays de la Loire
- Department: Maine-et-Loire
- Arrondissement: Saumur
- Canton: Saumur
- Intercommunality: CA Saumur Val de Loire

Government
  - Mayor (2020–2026): Pierre-Yves Delamare
- Area^{1}: 3.4 km^{2} (1.3 sq mi)
- Elevation: 39 m (128 ft)
- Highest elevation: 81 m (266 ft)
- Lowest elevation: 25 m (82 ft)
- Population (2023): 1,312
  - Density: 390/km^{2} (1,000/sq mi)
- Time zone: UTC+01:00 (CET)
  - Summer (DST): UTC+02:00 (CEST)
- INSEE/Postal code: 49362 /49400
- ^{1} French Land Register data, which excludes lakes, ponds, glaciers > 1 km^{2} (0.386 sq mi or 247 acres) and river estuaries.

Varrains (French pronunciation: [vaʁɛ̃]) is a commune in the Maine-et-Loire department in western France.

== See also ==
- Communes of the Maine-et-Loire department
