= Dénezé-sous-Doué =

- Commune
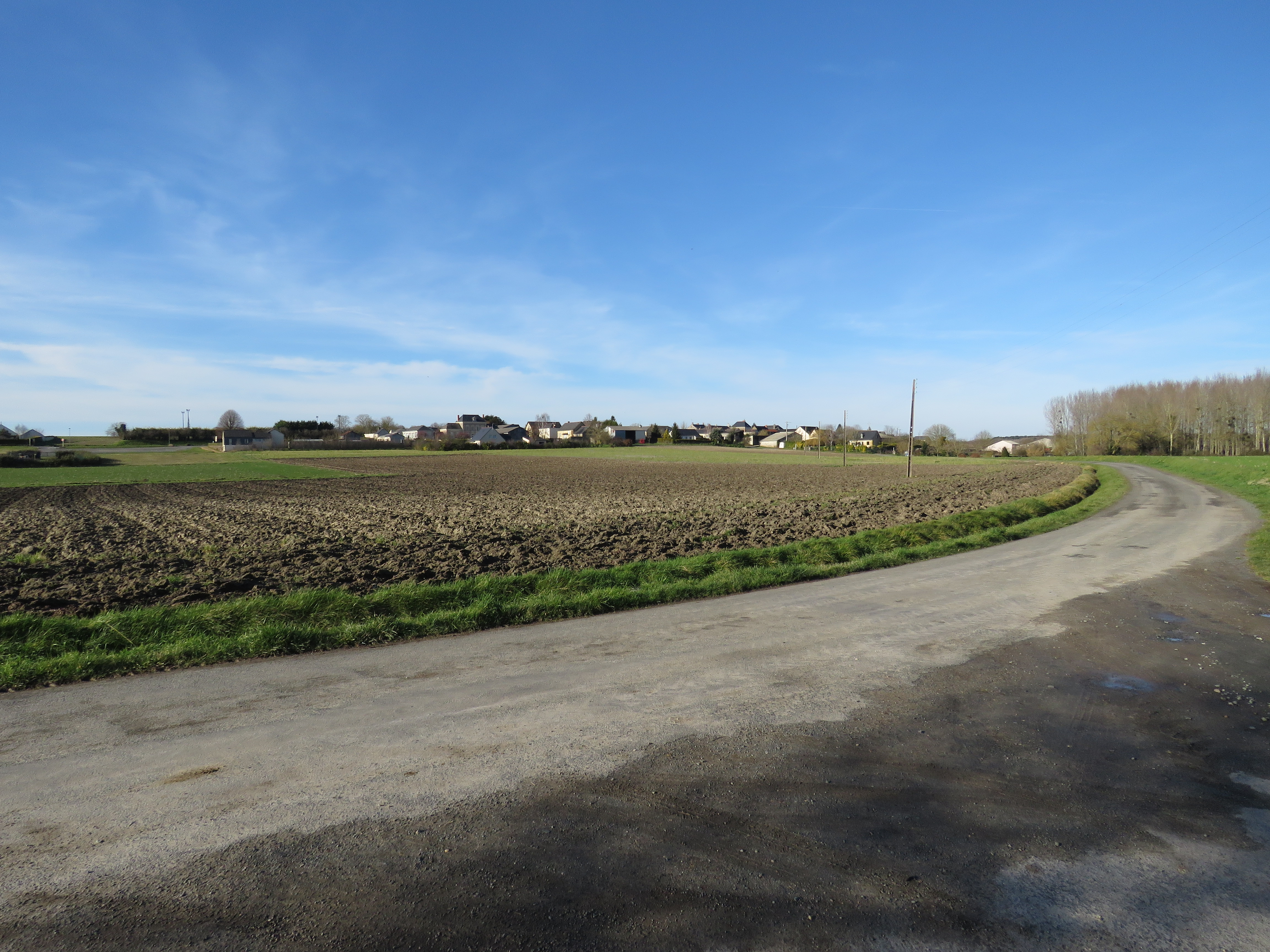
- A general view of Dénezé-sous-Doué
- Location of Dénezé-sous-Doué
- Location within France Location within Pays de la Loire
- Coordinates: 47°14′51″N 0°16′25″W
- Country: France
- Region: Pays de la Loire
- Department: Maine-et-Loire
- Arrondissement: Saumur
- Canton: Doué-en-Anjou
- Intercommunality: CA Saumur Val de Loire

Government
  - Mayor (2022–2026): Jean-Luc Girard
- Area^{1}: 23.77 km^{2} (9.18 sq mi)
- Elevation: 73 m (240 ft)
- Highest elevation: 101 m (331 ft)
- Lowest elevation: 54 m (177 ft)
- Population (2023): 444
  - Density: 18.7/km^{2} (48.4/sq mi)
- Demonym(s): Denezéen, Denezéenne
- Time zone: UTC+01:00 (CET)
  - Summer (DST): UTC+02:00 (CEST)
- INSEE/Postal code: 49121 /49700
- ^{1} French Land Register data, which excludes lakes, ponds, glaciers > 1 km^{2} (0.386 sq mi or 247 acres) and river estuaries.

Dénezé-sous-Doué (French pronunciation: [denze su dwe], literally Dénezé under Doué) is a commune in the Maine-et-Loire department in western France.

== See also ==
- Communes of the Maine-et-Loire department
