= Saint-Clément-des-Levées =

- Commune
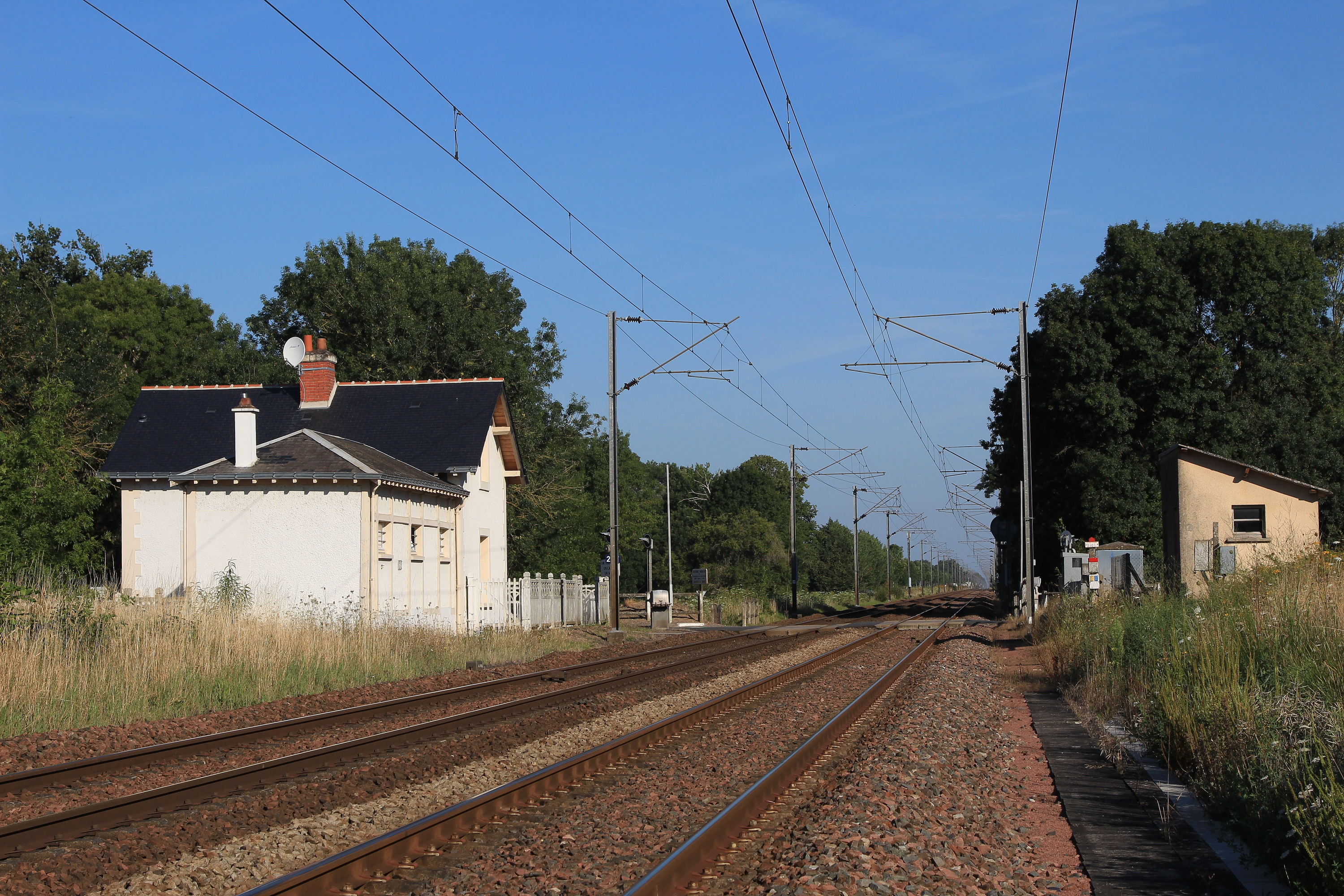
- Saint-Clément-des-Levées railway station
- Location of Saint-Clément-des-Levées
- Location within France Location within Pays de la Loire
- Coordinates: 47°19′54″N 0°11′01″W
- Country: France
- Region: Pays de la Loire
- Department: Maine-et-Loire
- Arrondissement: Saumur
- Canton: Longué-Jumelles
- Intercommunality: CA Saumur Val de Loire

Government
  - Mayor (2020–2026): Laurent Nivelle
- Area^{1}: 10.22 km^{2} (3.95 sq mi)
- Elevation: 24 m (79 ft)
- Highest elevation: 27 m (89 ft)
- Lowest elevation: 20 m (66 ft)
- Population (2023): 1,128
  - Density: 110.4/km^{2} (285.9/sq mi)
- Time zone: UTC+01:00 (CET)
  - Summer (DST): UTC+02:00 (CEST)
- INSEE/Postal code: 49272 /49350
- ^{1} French Land Register data, which excludes lakes, ponds, glaciers > 1 km^{2} (0.386 sq mi or 247 acres) and river estuaries.

Saint-Clément-des-Levées (French pronunciation: [sɛ̃ klemɑ̃ de ləve]) is a commune in the Maine-et-Loire department in western France.

== See also ==
- Communes of the Maine-et-Loire department
