= Longué-Jumelles =

- Commune
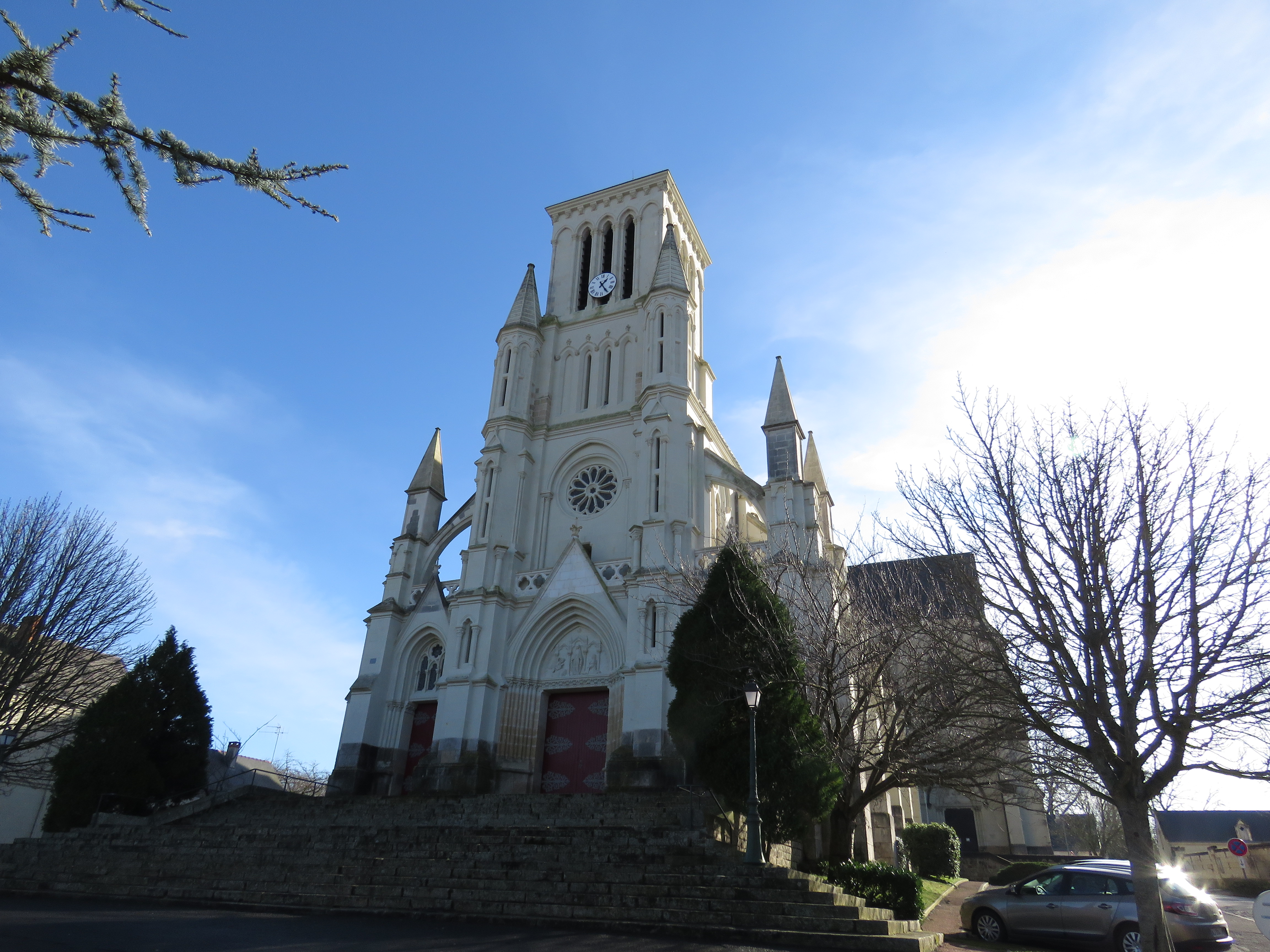
- The church in Longué

- Coat of arms
- Location of Longué-Jumelles
- Location within France Location within Pays de la Loire
- Coordinates: 47°22′45″N 0°06′24″W
- Country: France
- Region: Pays de la Loire
- Department: Maine-et-Loire
- Arrondissement: Saumur
- Canton: Longué-Jumelles
- Intercommunality: CA Saumur Val de Loire

Government
  - Mayor (2020–2026): Frédéric Mortier
- Area^{1}: 96.2 km^{2} (37.1 sq mi)
- Elevation: 40 m (130 ft)
- Highest elevation: 78 m (256 ft)
- Lowest elevation: 20 m (66 ft)
- Population (2023): 6,564
  - Density: 68.2/km^{2} (177/sq mi)
- Demonym(s): Longuéen-Jumellois, Longuéenne-Jumelloise
- Time zone: UTC+01:00 (CET)
  - Summer (DST): UTC+02:00 (CEST)
- INSEE/Postal code: 49180 /49160
- Website: www.villedelonguejumelles.fr
- ^{1} French Land Register data, which excludes lakes, ponds, glaciers > 1 km^{2} (0.386 sq mi or 247 acres) and river estuaries.

Longué-Jumelles (French pronunciation: [lɔ̃ɡe ʒymɛl]) is a commune in the Maine-et-Loire department in western France.

Longué-Jumelles is twinned with Calverton, Nottinghamshire in England.

== Population ==
Historical population
| Year | Pop. | ±% p.a. |
|---|---|---|
| 1968 | 5,936 | — |
| 1975 | 6,317 | +0.89% |
| 1982 | 6,773 | +1.00% |
| 1990 | 6,781 | +0.01% |
| 1999 | 6,928 | +0.24% |
| 2007 | 6,887 | −0.07% |
| 2012 | 6,851 | −0.10% |
| 2017 | 6,794 | −0.17% |
| 2023 | 6,564 | −0.57% |
Source: INSEE

== See also ==
- Communes of the Maine-et-Loire department
