= Mouliherne =

- Commune
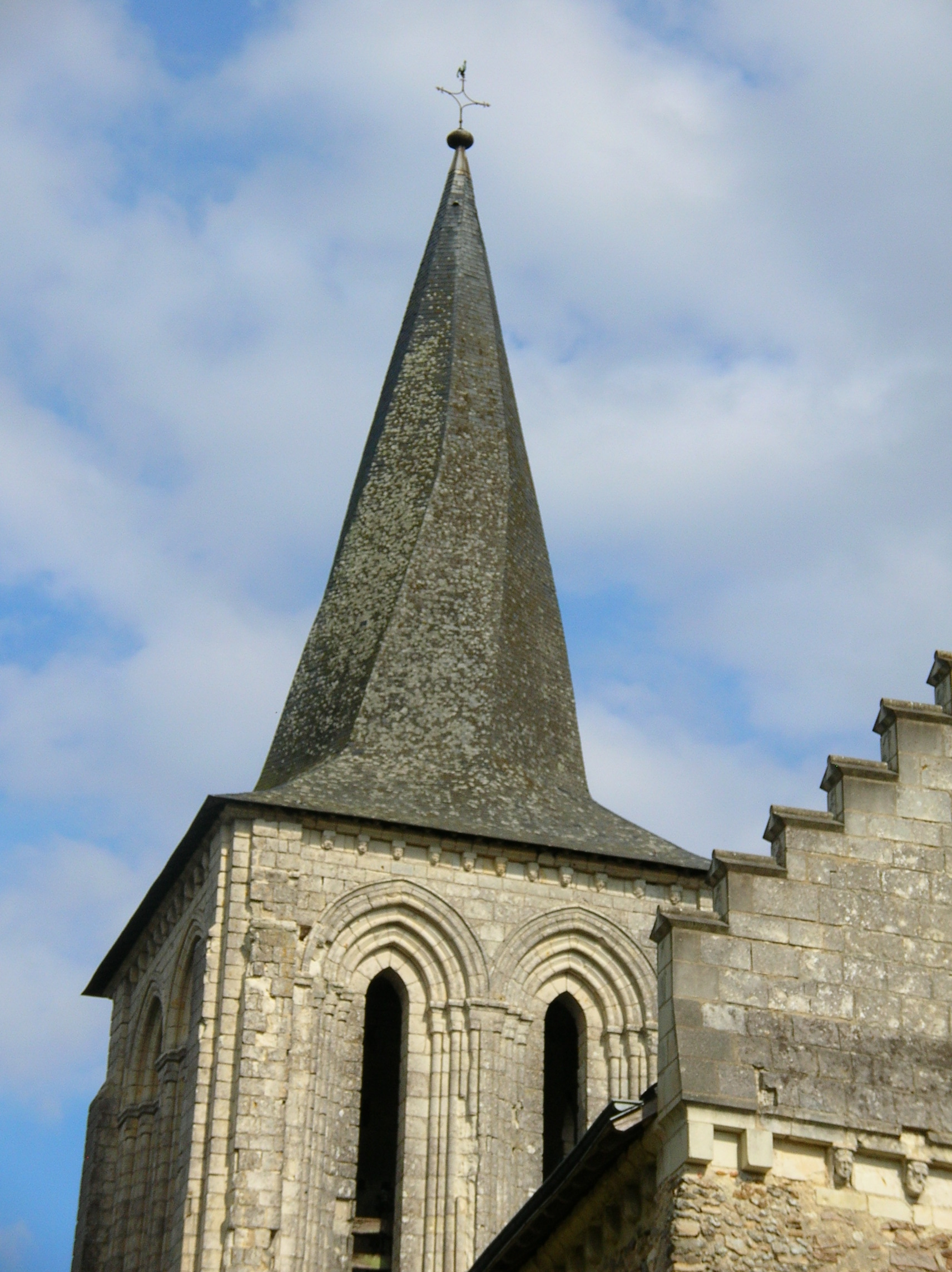
- The bell tower of the church in Mouliherne
- Location of Mouliherne
- Location within France Location within Pays de la Loire
- Coordinates: 47°28′02″N 0°01′04″E
- Country: France
- Region: Pays de la Loire
- Department: Maine-et-Loire
- Arrondissement: Saumur
- Canton: Longué-Jumelles
- Intercommunality: CA Saumur Val de Loire

Government
  - Mayor (2020–2026): Alain Bourdin
- Area^{1}: 40.79 km^{2} (15.75 sq mi)
- Highest elevation: 99 m (325 ft)
- Lowest elevation: 33 m (108 ft)
- Population (2023): 836
  - Density: 20.5/km^{2} (53.1/sq mi)
- Demonym(s): Moulihernais, Moulihernaise
- Time zone: UTC+01:00 (CET)
  - Summer (DST): UTC+02:00 (CEST)
- INSEE/Postal code: 49221 /49390
- ^{1} French Land Register data, which excludes lakes, ponds, glaciers > 1 km^{2} (0.386 sq mi or 247 acres) and river estuaries.

Mouliherne (French pronunciation: [muli.ɛʁn, -ljɛʁn]) is a commune in the Maine-et-Loire department in western France.

== See also ==
- Communes of the Maine-et-Loire department
