= Vernoil-le-Fourrier =

- Commune
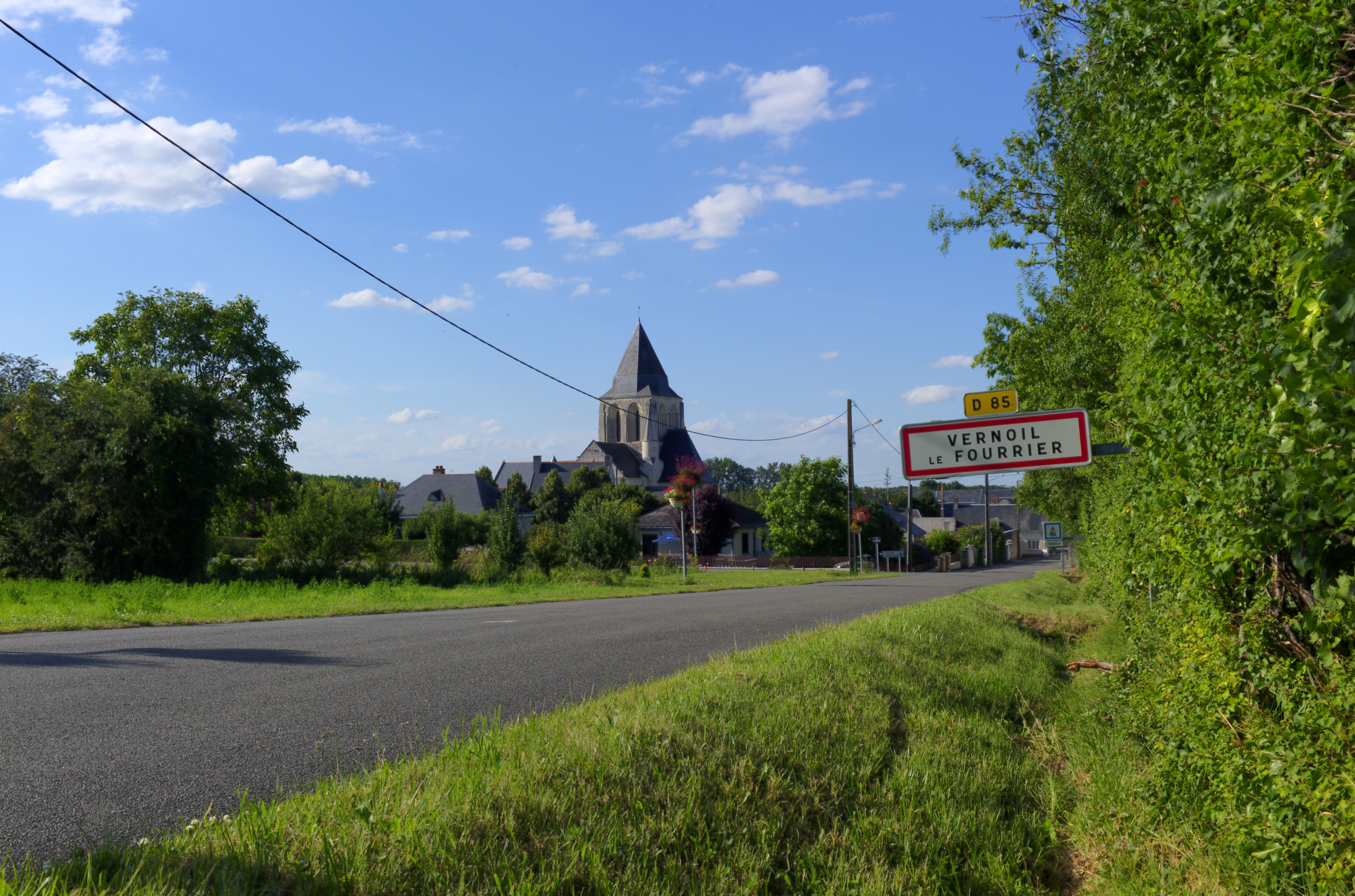
- The village of Vernoil-le-Fourrier

- Coat of arms
- Location of Vernoil-le-Fourrier
- Location within France Location within Pays de la Loire
- Coordinates: 47°23′18″N 0°04′48″E
- Country: France
- Region: Pays de la Loire
- Department: Maine-et-Loire
- Arrondissement: Saumur
- Canton: Longué-Jumelles
- Intercommunality: CA Saumur Val de Loire

Government
  - Mayor (2020–2026): Sylvie Beillard
- Area^{1}: 33.1 km^{2} (12.8 sq mi)
- Highest elevation: 120 m (390 ft)
- Lowest elevation: 45 m (148 ft)
- Population (2023): 1,366
  - Density: 41.3/km^{2} (107/sq mi)
- Demonym(s): Vernoilais, Vernoilaise
- Time zone: UTC+01:00 (CET)
  - Summer (DST): UTC+02:00 (CEST)
- INSEE/Postal code: 49369 /49390
- ^{1} French Land Register data, which excludes lakes, ponds, glaciers > 1 km^{2} (0.386 sq mi or 247 acres) and river estuaries.

Vernoil-le-Fourrier is a commune in the Maine-et-Loire department in western France.

The commune was formerly called Vernoil, and was officially renamed Vernoil-le-Fourrier on 7 July 2006.

== See also ==
- Communes of the Maine-et-Loire department
