= Distré =

- Commune
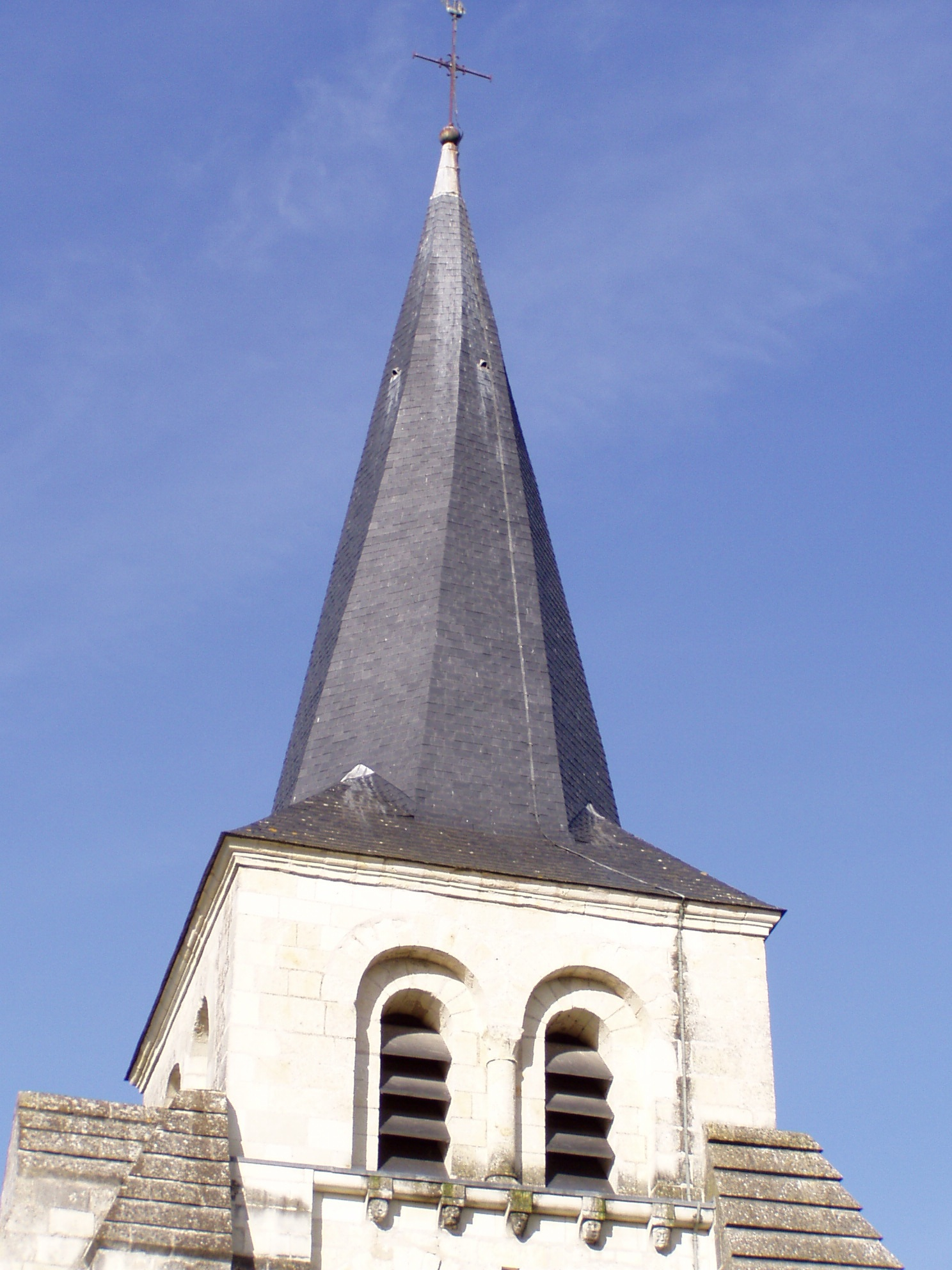
- The bell tower of the church
- Location of Distré
- Location within France Location within Pays de la Loire
- Coordinates: 47°13′29″N 0°06′38″W
- Country: France
- Region: Pays de la Loire
- Department: Maine-et-Loire
- Arrondissement: Saumur
- Canton: Saumur
- Intercommunality: CA Saumur Val de Loire

Government
  - Mayor (2020–2026): Éric Touron (UDI)
- Area^{1}: 14.72 km^{2} (5.68 sq mi)
- Elevation: 46 m (151 ft)
- Highest elevation: 77 m (253 ft)
- Lowest elevation: 25 m (82 ft)
- Population (2023): 1,806
  - Density: 122.7/km^{2} (317.8/sq mi)
- Demonym(s): Distréen, Distréenne
- Time zone: UTC+01:00 (CET)
  - Summer (DST): UTC+02:00 (CEST)
- INSEE/Postal code: 49123 /49400
- ^{1} French Land Register data, which excludes lakes, ponds, glaciers > 1 km^{2} (0.386 sq mi or 247 acres) and river estuaries.

Distré (French pronunciation: [distʁe]) is a commune in the Maine-et-Loire department in western France.

== See also ==
- Communes of the Maine-et-Loire department
