= Vaudelnay =

- Commune
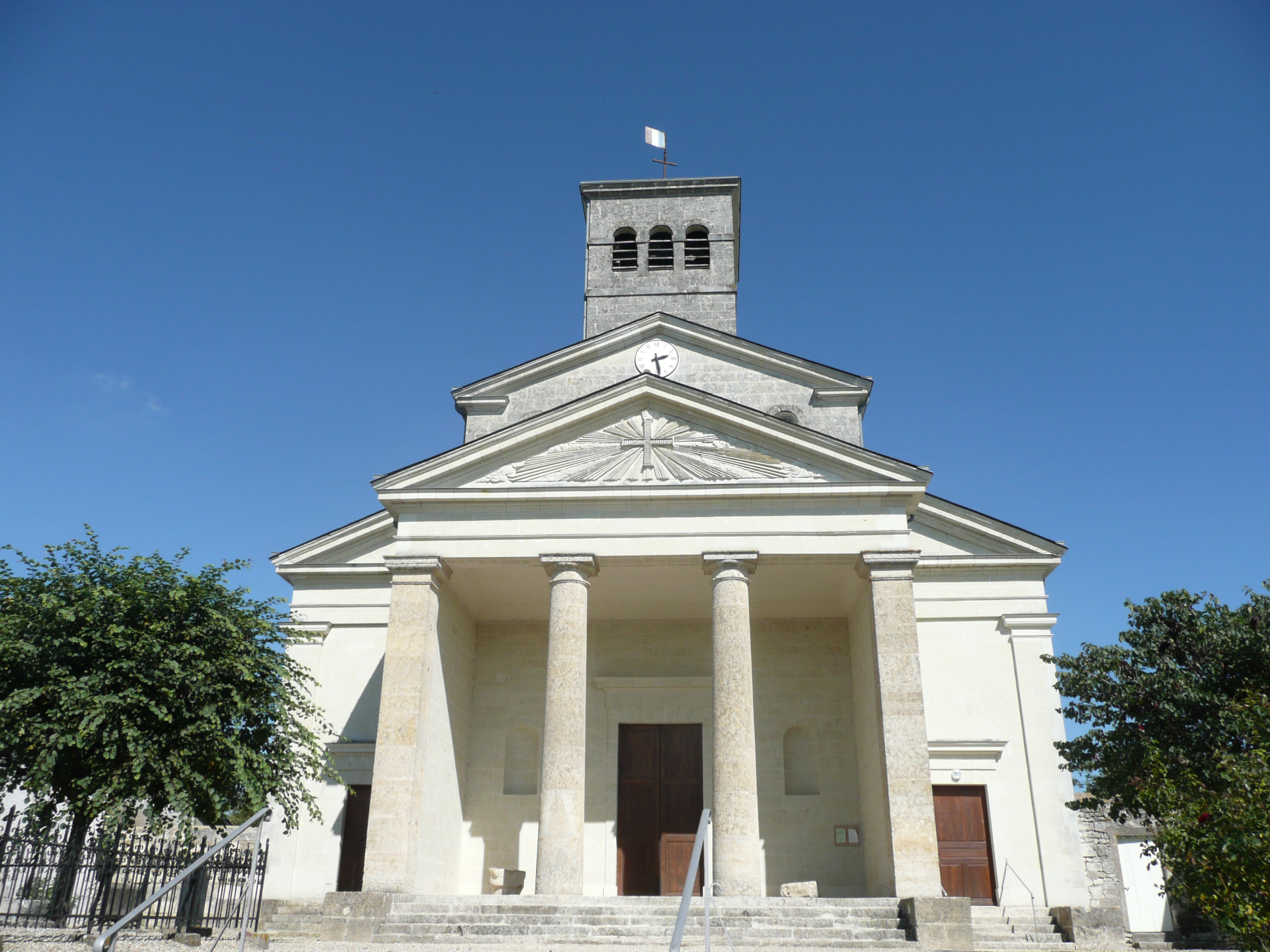
- The church of Saint-Pierre
- Location of Vaudelnay
- Location within France Location within Pays de la Loire
- Coordinates: 47°08′13″N 0°12′11″W
- Country: France
- Region: Pays de la Loire
- Department: Maine-et-Loire
- Arrondissement: Saumur
- Canton: Doué-en-Anjou
- Intercommunality: CA Saumur Val de Loire

Government
  - Mayor (2020–2026): Fabrice Bardy
- Area^{1}: 25.48 km^{2} (9.84 sq mi)
- Elevation: 64 m (210 ft)
- Highest elevation: 104 m (341 ft)
- Lowest elevation: 31 m (102 ft)
- Population (2023): 1,122
  - Density: 44.03/km^{2} (114.0/sq mi)
- Time zone: UTC+01:00 (CET)
  - Summer (DST): UTC+02:00 (CEST)
- INSEE/Postal code: 49364 /49260
- ^{1} French Land Register data, which excludes lakes, ponds, glaciers > 1 km^{2} (0.386 sq mi or 247 acres) and river estuaries.

Vaudelnay (French pronunciation: [vodɛ(l)nɛ], before 1953: Vaudelenay) is a commune in the Maine-et-Loire department in western France.

== See also ==
- Communes of the Maine-et-Loire department
- François Cevert - buried in this region.
