= Courchamps, Maine-et-Loire =

Courchamps
- Commune
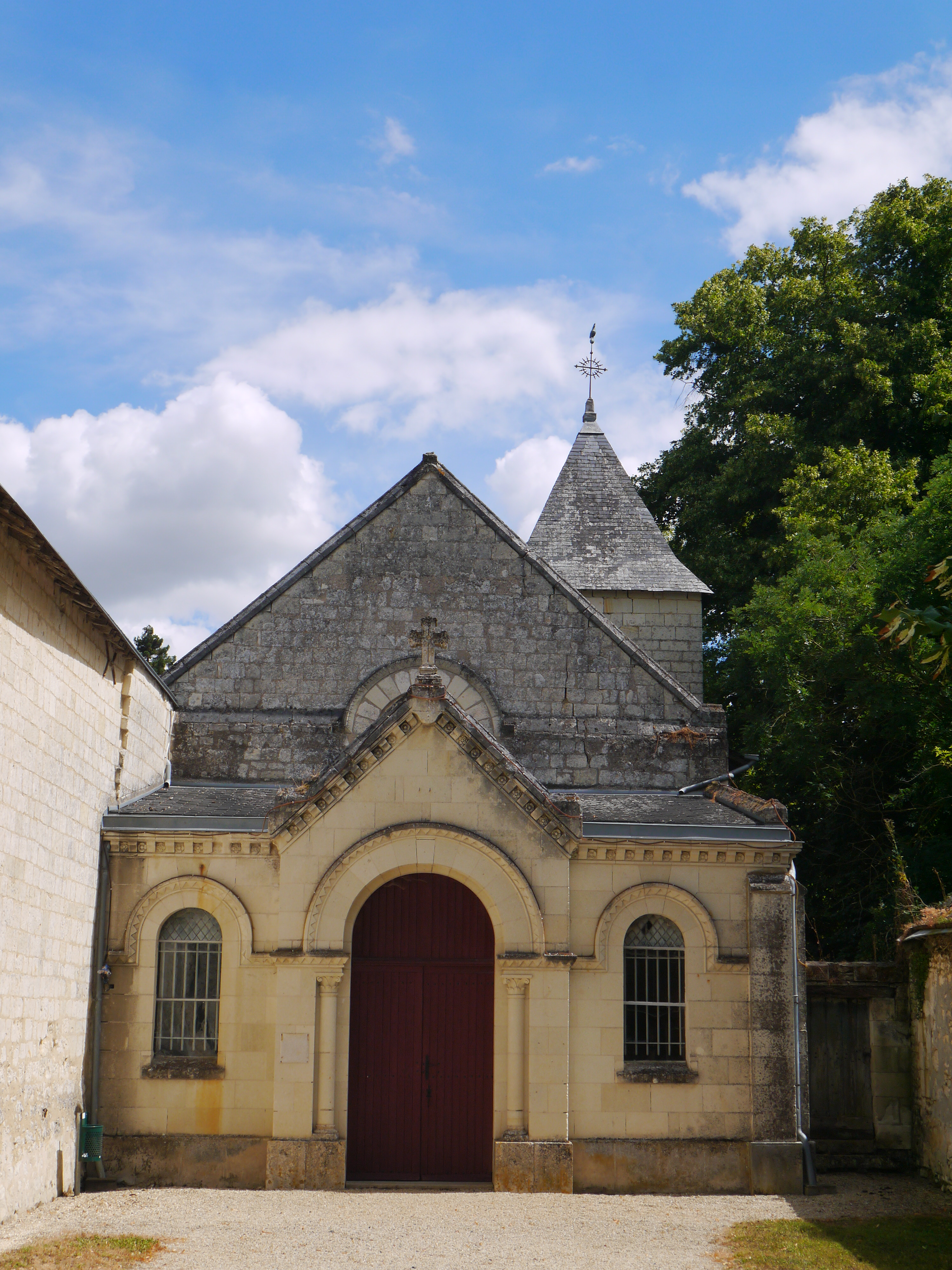
- The church in Courchamps
- Location of Courchamps
- Location within France Location within Pays de la Loire
- Coordinates: 47°12′06″N 0°09′25″W
- Country: France
- Region: Pays de la Loire
- Department: Maine-et-Loire
- Arrondissement: Saumur
- Canton: Doué-en-Anjou
- Intercommunality: CA Saumur Val de Loire

Government
  - Mayor (2020–2026): Jean-Pierre Antoine
- Area^{1}: 6.99 km^{2} (2.70 sq mi)
- Elevation: 70 m (230 ft)
- Highest elevation: 80 m (260 ft)
- Lowest elevation: 34 m (112 ft)
- Population (2023): 533
  - Density: 76.3/km^{2} (197/sq mi)
- Demonym(s): Courchampois, Courchampoise
- Time zone: UTC+01:00 (CET)
  - Summer (DST): UTC+02:00 (CEST)
- INSEE/Postal code: 49113 /49260
- ^{1} French Land Register data, which excludes lakes, ponds, glaciers > 1 km^{2} (0.386 sq mi or 247 acres) and river estuaries.

Courchamps (French pronunciation: [kuʁʃɑ̃]) is a commune in the Maine-et-Loire department in western France.

== See also ==
- Communes of the Maine-et-Loire department
