= Épieds, Maine-et-Loire =

Commune in Maine-et-Loire, France

Épieds
- Commune
- Location of Épieds
- Location within France Location within Pays de la Loire
- Coordinates: 47°08′41″N 0°02′42″W
- Country: France
- Region: Pays de la Loire
- Department: Maine-et-Loire
- Arrondissement: Saumur
- Canton: Doué-en-Anjou
- Intercommunality: CA Saumur Val de Loire

Government
  - Mayor (2020–2026): Guillaume Martin
- Area^{1}: 26.99 km^{2} (10.42 sq mi)
- Elevation: 33 m (108 ft)
- Highest elevation: 111 m (364 ft)
- Lowest elevation: 29 m (95 ft)
- Population (2023): 711
  - Density: 26.3/km^{2} (68.2/sq mi)
- Demonym(s): Epiedois, Epiedoise
- Time zone: UTC+01:00 (CET)
  - Summer (DST): UTC+02:00 (CEST)
- INSEE/Postal code: 49131 /49260
- ^{1} French Land Register data, which excludes lakes, ponds, glaciers > 1 km^{2} (0.386 sq mi or 247 acres) and river estuaries.

Épieds (French pronunciation: [epje]) is a commune in the Maine-et-Loire department in western France.

== See also ==
- Communes of the Maine-et-Loire department
