= Neuillé =

- Commune
- Location of Neuillé
- Location within France Location within Pays de la Loire
- Coordinates: 47°20′32″N 0°02′02″W
- Country: France
- Region: Pays de la Loire
- Department: Maine-et-Loire
- Arrondissement: Saumur
- Canton: Longué-Jumelles
- Intercommunality: CA Saumur Val de Loire

Government
  - Mayor (2020–2026): Guy Bertin
- Area^{1}: 13.56 km^{2} (5.24 sq mi)
- Elevation: 32 m (105 ft)
- Highest elevation: 111 m (364 ft)
- Lowest elevation: 27 m (89 ft)
- Population (2023): 1,028
  - Density: 75.81/km^{2} (196.4/sq mi)
- Demonym(s): Neuilléen, Neuilléenne
- Time zone: UTC+01:00 (CET)
  - Summer (DST): UTC+02:00 (CEST)
- INSEE/Postal code: 49224 /49680
- ^{1} French Land Register data, which excludes lakes, ponds, glaciers > 1 km^{2} (0.386 sq mi or 247 acres) and river estuaries.

Neuillé (French pronunciation: [nœje]) is a commune in the Maine-et-Loire department in western France.

== See also ==
- Communes of the Maine-et-Loire department
