= Courléon =

- Commune
- Coat of arms
- Location of Courléon
- Location within France Location within Pays de la Loire
- Coordinates: 47°23′28″N 0°08′39″E
- Country: France
- Region: Pays de la Loire
- Department: Maine-et-Loire
- Arrondissement: Saumur
- Canton: Longué-Jumelles
- Intercommunality: CA Saumur Val de Loire

Government
  - Mayor (2022–2026): Olivier Deschard
- Area^{1}: 13.77 km^{2} (5.32 sq mi)
- Elevation: 78 m (256 ft)
- Highest elevation: 119 m (390 ft)
- Lowest elevation: 57 m (187 ft)
- Population (2023): 142
  - Density: 10.3/km^{2} (26.7/sq mi)
- Demonym(s): Courléonais, Courléonaise
- Time zone: UTC+01:00 (CET)
  - Summer (DST): UTC+02:00 (CEST)
- INSEE/Postal code: 49114 /49390
- ^{1} French Land Register data, which excludes lakes, ponds, glaciers > 1 km^{2} (0.386 sq mi or 247 acres) and river estuaries.

Courléon (French pronunciation: [kuʁleɔ̃]) is a commune in the Maine-et-Loire department in western France.

== See also ==
- Communes of the Maine-et-Loire department
