= Varennes-sur-Loire =

- Commune
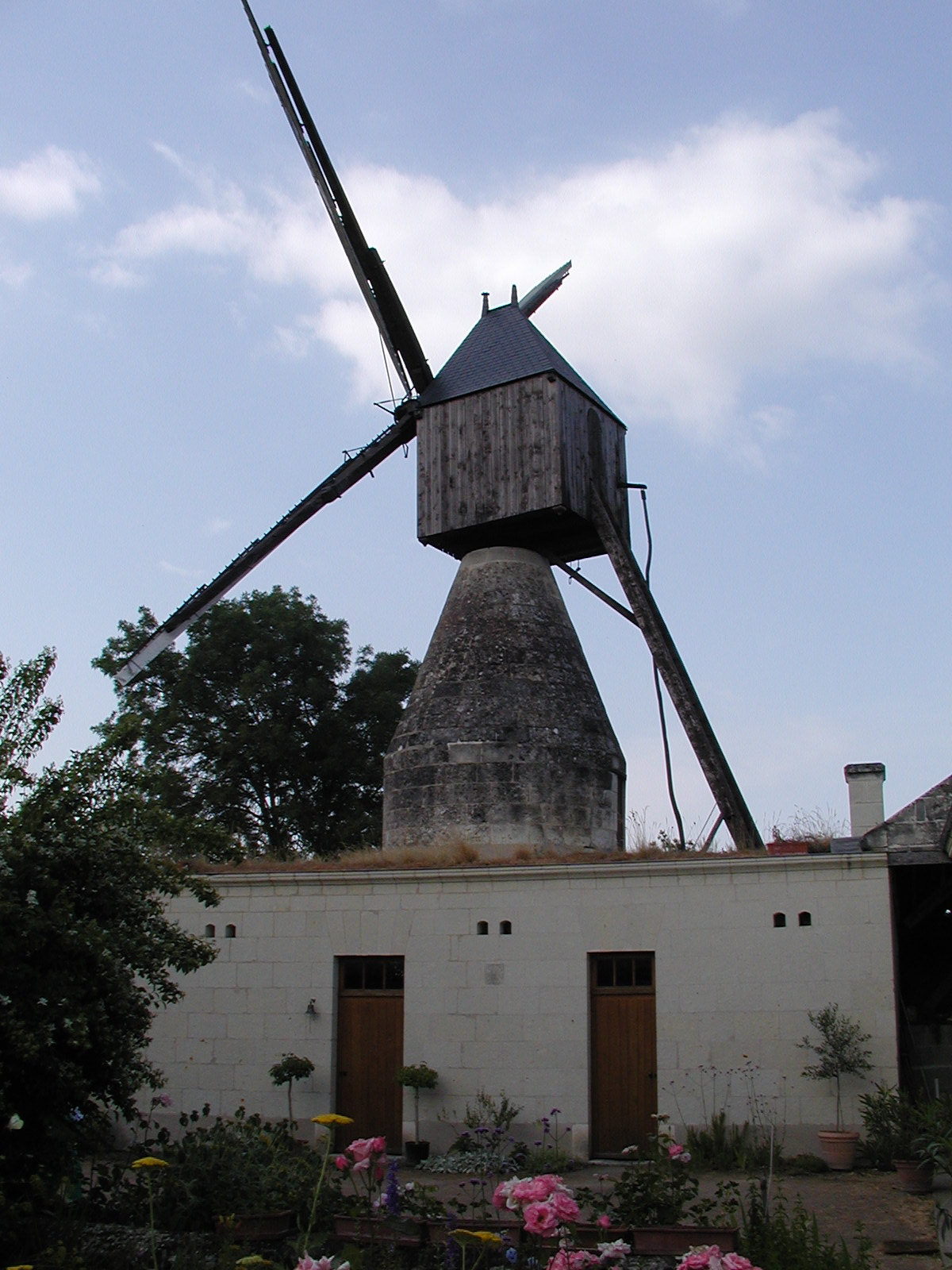
- A windmill at Le Champ-des-Îles

- Coat of arms
- Location of Varennes-sur-Loire
- Location within France Location within Pays de la Loire
- Coordinates: 47°14′20″N 0°03′14″E
- Country: France
- Region: Pays de la Loire
- Department: Maine-et-Loire
- Arrondissement: Saumur
- Canton: Longué-Jumelles
- Intercommunality: CA Saumur Val de Loire

Government
  - Mayor (2020–2026): Gilles Talluau
- Area^{1}: 22.66 km^{2} (8.75 sq mi)
- Elevation: 28 m (92 ft)
- Highest elevation: 32 m (105 ft)
- Lowest elevation: 23 m (75 ft)
- Population (2023): 1,922
  - Density: 84.82/km^{2} (219.7/sq mi)
- Time zone: UTC+01:00 (CET)
  - Summer (DST): UTC+02:00 (CEST)
- INSEE/Postal code: 49361 /49730
- ^{1} French Land Register data, which excludes lakes, ponds, glaciers > 1 km^{2} (0.386 sq mi or 247 acres) and river estuaries.

Varennes-sur-Loire (French pronunciation: [vaʁɛn syʁ lwaʁ], literally Varennes on Loire) is a commune in the Maine-et-Loire department in western France.

== See also ==
- Communes of the Maine-et-Loire department
