= Artannes-sur-Thouet =

- Commune
- Location of Artannes-sur-Thouet
- Location within France Location within Pays de la Loire
- Coordinates: 47°12′00″N 0°05′37″W
- Country: France
- Region: Pays de la Loire
- Department: Maine-et-Loire
- Arrondissement: Saumur
- Canton: Saumur
- Intercommunality: CA Saumur Val Loire

Government
  - Mayor (2020–2026): Didier Rousseau
- Area^{1}: 6.61 km^{2} (2.55 sq mi)
- Elevation: 40 m (130 ft)
- Highest elevation: 55 m (180 ft)
- Lowest elevation: 25 m (82 ft)
- Population (2023): 405
  - Density: 61.3/km^{2} (159/sq mi)
- Time zone: UTC+01:00 (CET)
  - Summer (DST): UTC+02:00 (CEST)
- INSEE/Postal code: 49011 /49260
- ^{1} French Land Register data, which excludes lakes, ponds, glaciers > 1 km^{2} (0.386 sq mi or 247 acres) and river estuaries.

Artannes-sur-Thouet (French pronunciation: [aʁtan syʁ twɛ], literally Artannes on Thouet) is a commune in the Maine-et-Loire department in western France.

== Population ==
Historical population
Year	Pop.	±% p.a.
1968	148	—
1975	162	+1.30%
1982	292	+8.78%
1990	328	+1.46%
1999	399	+2.20%
2007	452	+1.57%
2012	418	−1.55%
2017	424	+0.29%
2023	405	−0.76%
Source: INSEE

== See also ==
- Communes of the Maine-et-Loire department
