= Rou-Marson =

- Commune
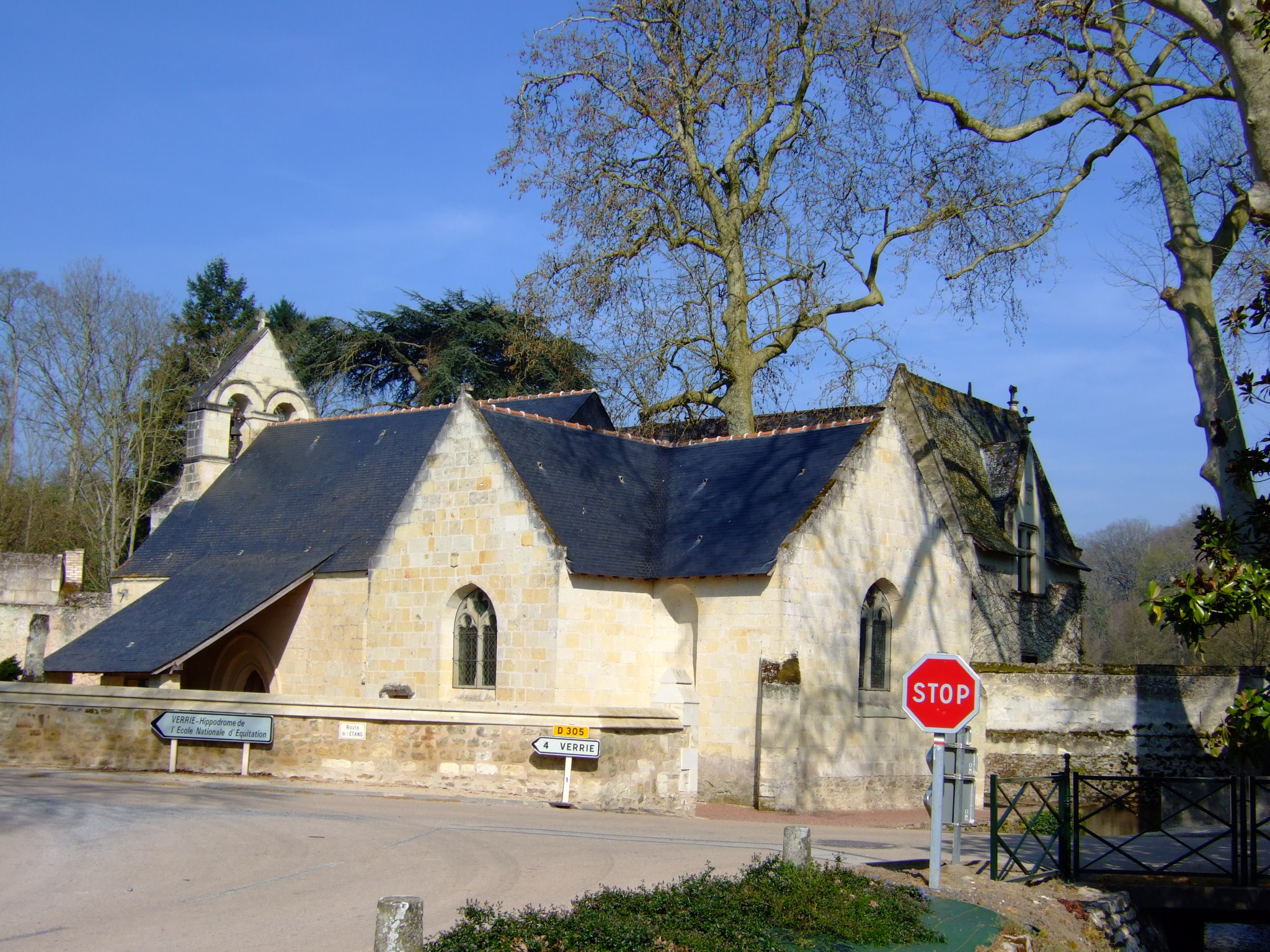
- The church of Marson
- Location of Rou-Marson
- Location within France Location within Pays de la Loire
- Coordinates: 47°14′06″N 0°09′18″W
- Country: France
- Region: Pays de la Loire
- Department: Maine-et-Loire
- Arrondissement: Saumur
- Canton: Saumur
- Intercommunality: CA Saumur Val de Loire

Government
  - Mayor (2020–2026): Rodolphe Mirande
- Area^{1}: 12.66 km^{2} (4.89 sq mi)
- Elevation: 39 m (128 ft)
- Highest elevation: 87 m (285 ft)
- Lowest elevation: 32 m (105 ft)
- Population (2023): 638
  - Density: 50.4/km^{2} (131/sq mi)
- Time zone: UTC+01:00 (CET)
  - Summer (DST): UTC+02:00 (CEST)
- INSEE/Postal code: 49262 /49400
- ^{1} French Land Register data, which excludes lakes, ponds, glaciers > 1 km^{2} (0.386 sq mi or 247 acres) and river estuaries.

Rou-Marson (French pronunciation: [ʁu maʁsɔ̃]) is a commune in the Maine-et-Loire department in western France.

== See also ==
- Communes of the Maine-et-Loire department
