= Le Coudray-Macouard =

- Commune
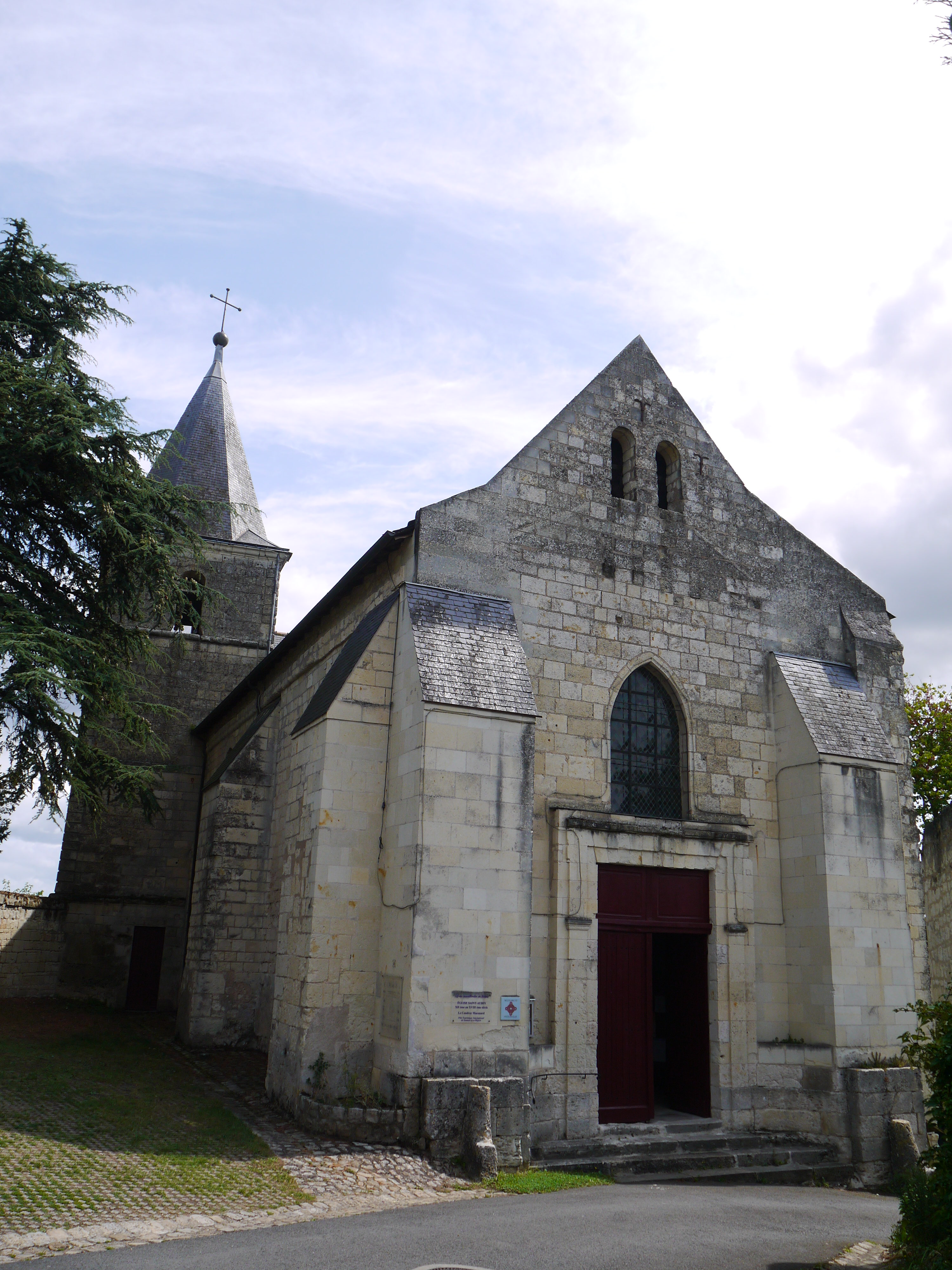
- Church of Notre Dame
- Location of Le Coudray-Macouard
- Location within France Location within Pays de la Loire
- Coordinates: 47°11′44″N 0°07′06″W
- Country: France
- Region: Pays de la Loire
- Department: Maine-et-Loire
- Arrondissement: Saumur
- Canton: Doué-en-Anjou
- Intercommunality: CA Saumur Val de Loire

Government
  - Mayor (2020–2026): Gérard Police
- Area^{1}: 13.4 km^{2} (5.2 sq mi)
- Elevation: 83 m (272 ft)
- Highest elevation: 67 m (220 ft)
- Lowest elevation: 27 m (89 ft)
- Population (2023): 918
  - Density: 68.5/km^{2} (177/sq mi)
- Demonym(s): Coudraisien, Coudraisienne
- Time zone: UTC+01:00 (CET)
  - Summer (DST): UTC+02:00 (CEST)
- INSEE/Postal code: 49112 /49260
- ^{1} French Land Register data, which excludes lakes, ponds, glaciers > 1 km^{2} (0.386 sq mi or 247 acres) and river estuaries.

Le Coudray-Macouard (French pronunciation: [lə kudʁɛ makwaʁ]) is a commune in the Maine-et-Loire department in western France.

== See also ==
- Communes of the Maine-et-Loire department
