= La Breille-les-Pins =

- Commune
- Coat of arms
- Location of La Breille-les-Pins
- Location within France Location within Pays de la Loire
- Coordinates: 47°20′29″N 0°04′43″E
- Country: France
- Region: Pays de la Loire
- Department: Maine-et-Loire
- Arrondissement: Saumur
- Canton: Longué-Jumelles
- Intercommunality: CA Saumur Val de Loire

Government
  - Mayor (2020–2026): Armelle Poncet
- Area^{1}: 27.57 km^{2} (10.64 sq mi)
- Elevation: 105 m (344 ft)
- Highest elevation: 118 m (387 ft)
- Lowest elevation: 55 m (180 ft)
- Population (2023): 624
  - Density: 22.6/km^{2} (58.6/sq mi)
- Time zone: UTC+01:00 (CET)
  - Summer (DST): UTC+02:00 (CEST)
- INSEE/Postal code: 49045 /49390
- ^{1} French Land Register data, which excludes lakes, ponds, glaciers > 1 km^{2} (0.386 sq mi or 247 acres) and river estuaries.

La Breille-les-Pins (French pronunciation: [la bʁɛj le pɛ̃]) is a commune in the Maine-et-Loire department in western France.

== Population ==
Historical population
| Year | Pop. | ±% p.a. |
|---|---|---|
| 1968 | 334 | — |
| 1975 | 281 | −2.44% |
| 1982 | 270 | −0.57% |
| 1990 | 345 | +3.11% |
| 1999 | 444 | +2.84% |
| 2007 | 550 | +2.71% |
| 2012 | 585 | +1.24% |
| 2017 | 602 | +0.57% |
| 2023 | 624 | +0.60% |
Source: INSEE

== See also ==
- Communes of the Maine-et-Loire department
