= Les Ulmes =

- Commune
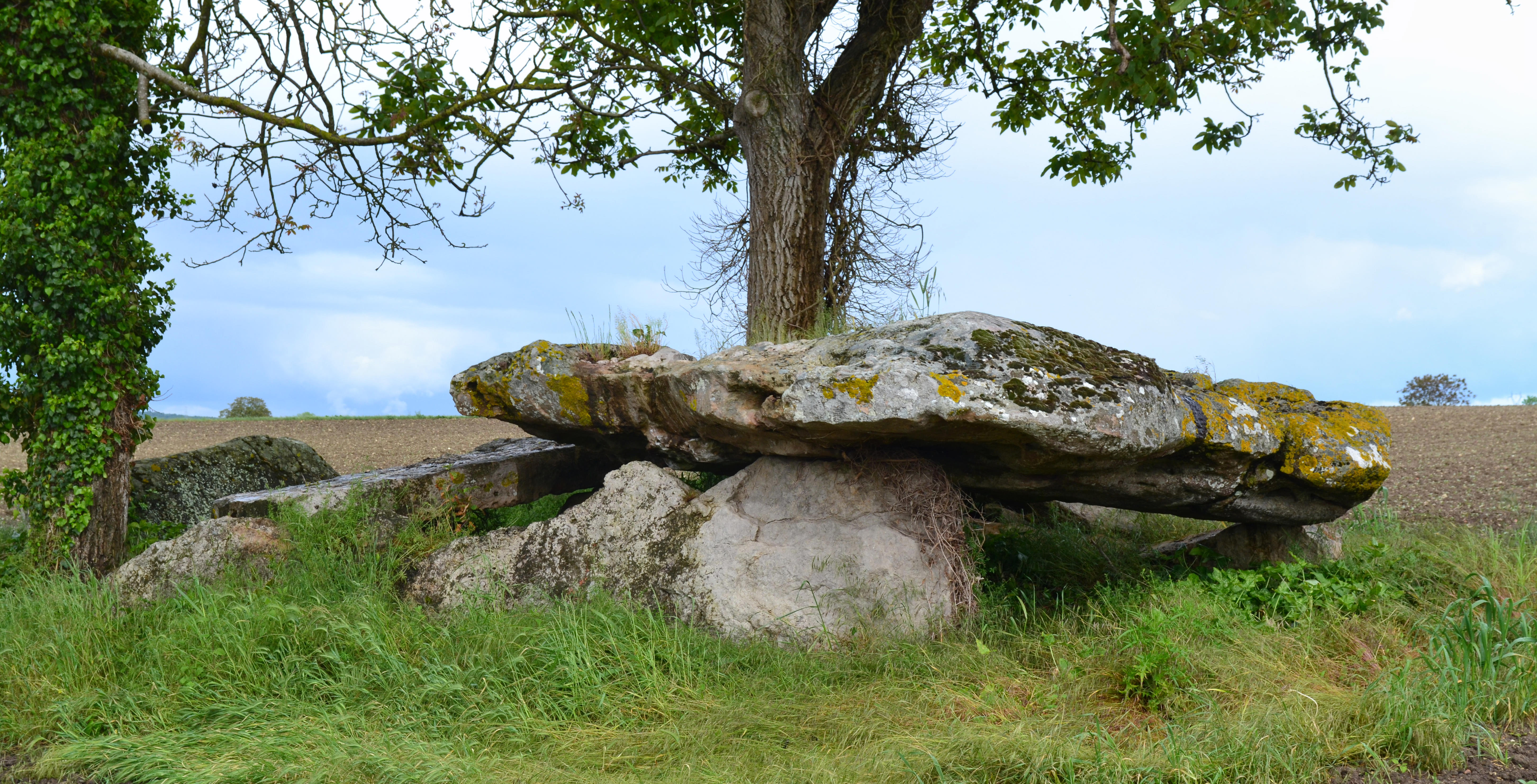
- The Pierre couverte du Mousseau dolmen in Les Ulmes
- Location of Les Ulmes
- Location within France Location within Pays de la Loire
- Coordinates: 47°13′12″N 0°10′38″W
- Country: France
- Region: Pays de la Loire
- Department: Maine-et-Loire
- Arrondissement: Saumur
- Canton: Doué-en-Anjou
- Intercommunality: CA Saumur Val de Loire

Government
  - Mayor (2020–2026): Didier Guillaume
- Area^{1}: 8.1 km^{2} (3.1 sq mi)
- Elevation: 55 m (180 ft)
- Highest elevation: 97 m (318 ft)
- Lowest elevation: 39 m (128 ft)
- Population (2023): 544
  - Density: 67/km^{2} (170/sq mi)
- Demonym(s): Ulmois, Ulmoise
- Time zone: UTC+01:00 (CET)
  - Summer (DST): UTC+02:00 (CEST)
- INSEE/Postal code: 49359 /49700
- ^{1} French Land Register data, which excludes lakes, ponds, glaciers > 1 km^{2} (0.386 sq mi or 247 acres) and river estuaries.

Les Ulmes (French pronunciation: [le.z‿ylm]) is a commune in the Maine-et-Loire department in western France.

== See also ==
- Communes of the Maine-et-Loire department
