= La Lande-Chasles =

- Commune
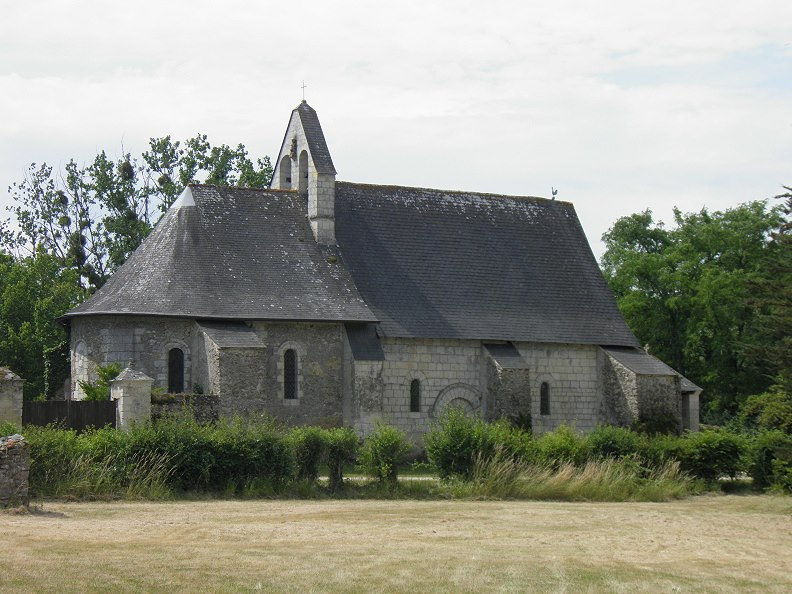
- The church in La Lande-Chasles

- Flag Coat of arms
- Location of La Lande-Chasles
- Location within France Location within Pays de la Loire
- Coordinates: 47°28′13″N 0°03′50″W
- Country: France
- Region: Pays de la Loire
- Department: Maine-et-Loire
- Arrondissement: Saumur
- Canton: Longué-Jumelles
- Intercommunality: CA Saumur Val de Loire

Government
  - Mayor (2020–2026): Jean-Christophe Rouxel
- Area^{1}: 5.08 km^{2} (1.96 sq mi)
- Elevation: 68 m (223 ft)
- Highest elevation: 75 m (246 ft)
- Lowest elevation: 39 m (128 ft)
- Population (2023): 116
  - Density: 22.8/km^{2} (59.1/sq mi)
- Demonym(s): Karolandais, Karolandaise
- Time zone: UTC+01:00 (CET)
  - Summer (DST): UTC+02:00 (CEST)
- INSEE/Postal code: 49171 /49150
- Website: lalandechasles.free.fr
- ^{1} French Land Register data, which excludes lakes, ponds, glaciers > 1 km^{2} (0.386 sq mi or 247 acres) and river estuaries.

La Lande-Chasles (French pronunciation: [la lɑ̃d ʃal]) is a commune in the Maine-et-Loire department in western France.

== See also ==
- Communes of the Maine-et-Loire department
