= Vivy, Maine-et-Loire =

Vivy
- Commune
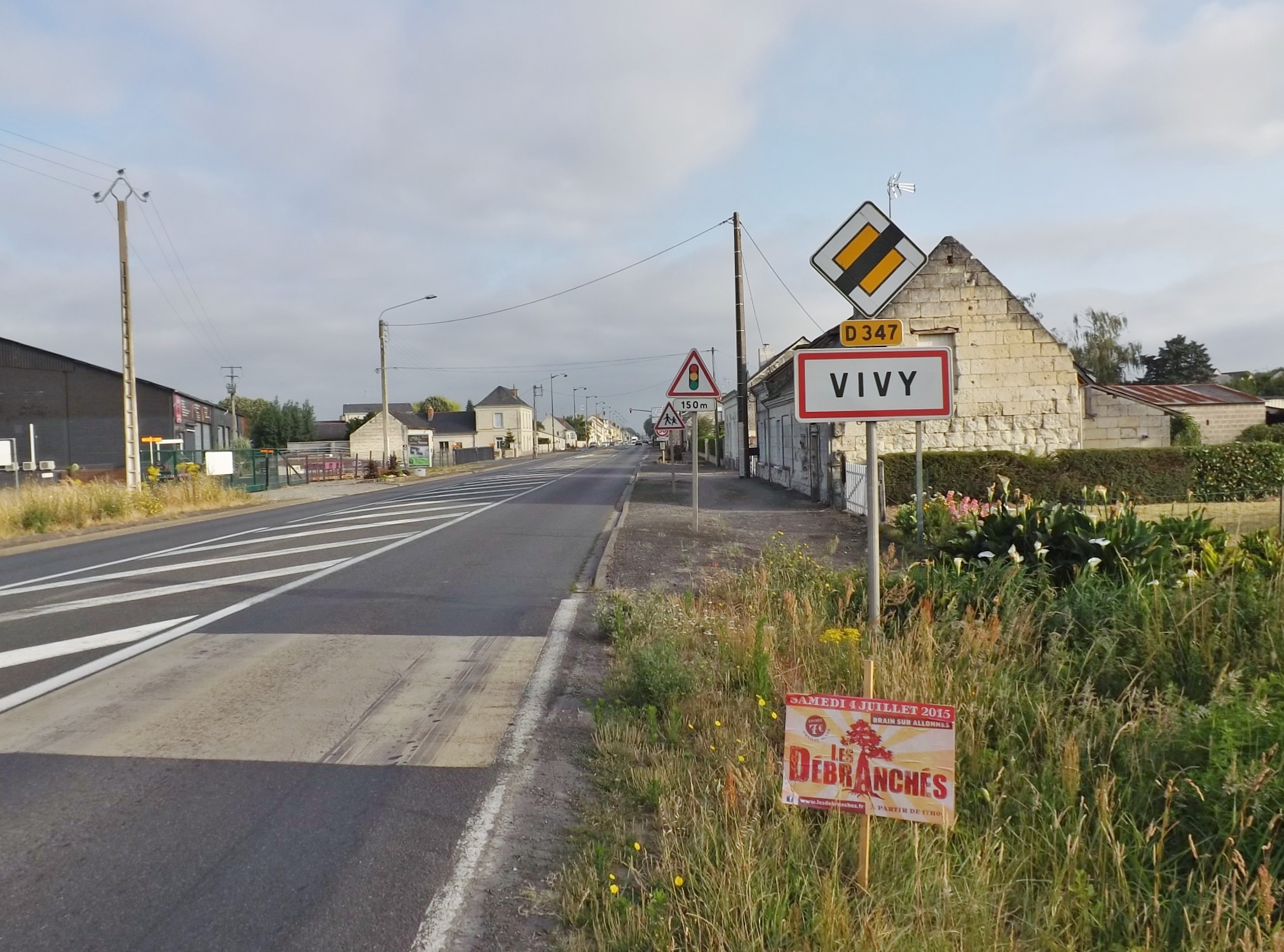
- The road into Vivy
- Location of Vivy
- Location within France Location within Pays de la Loire
- Coordinates: 47°19′37″N 0°03′11″W
- Country: France
- Region: Pays de la Loire
- Department: Maine-et-Loire
- Arrondissement: Saumur
- Canton: Longué-Jumelles
- Intercommunality: Saumur Val de Loire

Government
  - Mayor (2020–2026): Béatrice Bertrand
- Area^{1}: 23.17 km^{2} (8.95 sq mi)
- Elevation: 29 m (95 ft)
- Highest elevation: 47 m (154 ft)
- Lowest elevation: 20 m (66 ft)
- Population (2023): 2,582
  - Density: 111.4/km^{2} (288.6/sq mi)
- Time zone: UTC+01:00 (CET)
  - Summer (DST): UTC+02:00 (CEST)
- INSEE/Postal code: 49378 /49680
- ^{1} French Land Register data, which excludes lakes, ponds, glaciers > 1 km^{2} (0.386 sq mi or 247 acres) and river estuaries.

Vivy (French pronunciation: [vivi]) is a commune in the Maine-et-Loire department in western France.

== Population ==
Historical population
Year	Pop.	±% p.a.
1968	1,434	—
1975	1,672	+2.22%
1982	1,806	+1.11%
1990	1,885	+0.54%
1999	1,873	−0.07%
2007	2,194	+2.00%
2012	2,457	+2.29%
2017	2,582	+1.00%
2023	2,582	+0.00%
Source: INSEE

== See also ==
- Communes of the Maine-et-Loire department
