= Saint-Philbert-du-Peuple =

- Commune
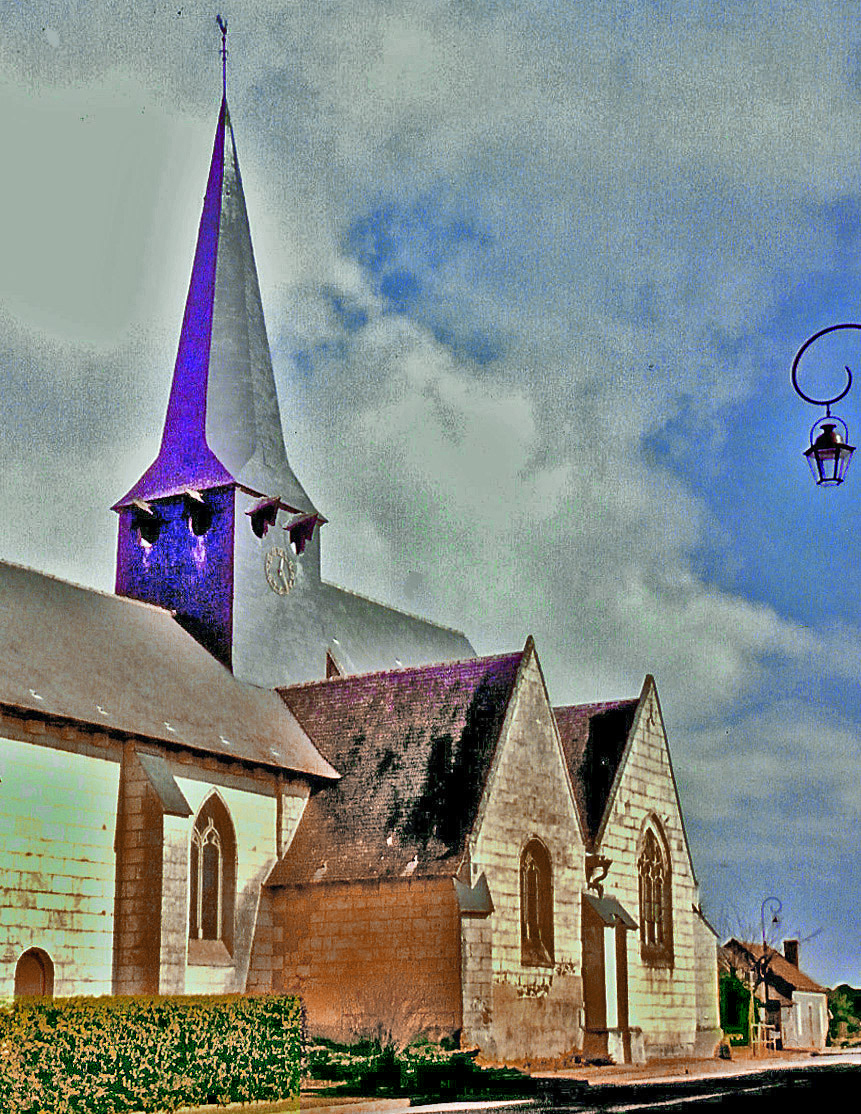
- The church of Saint-Philbert in Saint-Philbert-du-Peuple

- Coat of arms
- Location of Saint-Philbert-du-Peuple
- Location within France Location within Pays de la Loire
- Coordinates: 47°23′38″N 0°02′34″W
- Country: France
- Region: Pays de la Loire
- Department: Maine-et-Loire
- Arrondissement: Saumur
- Canton: Longué-Jumelles
- Intercommunality: CA Saumur Val de Loire

Government
  - Mayor (2020–2026): Christian Ruault
- Area^{1}: 16.38 km^{2} (6.32 sq mi)
- Elevation: 58 m (190 ft)
- Highest elevation: 58 m (190 ft)
- Lowest elevation: 24 m (79 ft)
- Population (2023): 1,307
  - Density: 79.79/km^{2} (206.7/sq mi)
- Time zone: UTC+01:00 (CET)
  - Summer (DST): UTC+02:00 (CEST)
- INSEE/Postal code: 49311 /49160
- ^{1} French Land Register data, which excludes lakes, ponds, glaciers > 1 km^{2} (0.386 sq mi or 247 acres) and river estuaries.

Saint-Philbert-du-Peuple (French pronunciation: [sɛ̃ filbɛʁ dy pœpl]) is a commune in the Maine-et-Loire department in western France.

== See also ==
- Communes of the Maine-et-Loire department
