= Louresse-Rochemenier =

- Commune
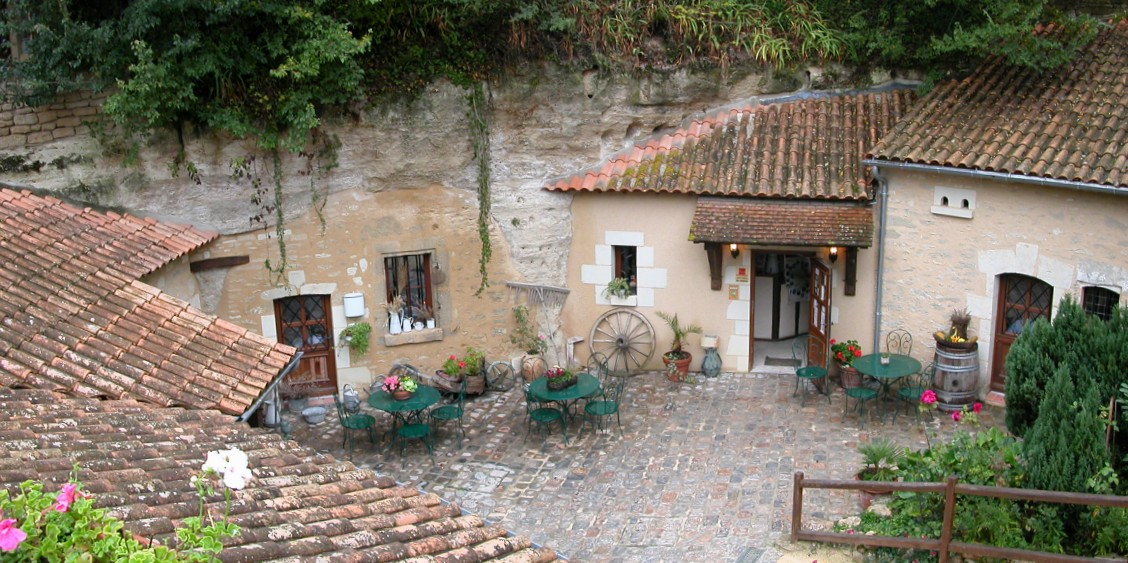
- Troglodytic houses in Rochemenier
- Location of Louresse-Rochemenier
- Location within France Location within Pays de la Loire
- Coordinates: 47°14′24″N 0°18′45″W
- Country: France
- Region: Pays de la Loire
- Department: Maine-et-Loire
- Arrondissement: Saumur
- Canton: Doué-en-Anjou
- Intercommunality: CA Saumur Val de Loire

Government
  - Mayor (2020–2026): Pierre-Yves Douet
- Area^{1}: 25.82 km^{2} (9.97 sq mi)
- Elevation: 71 m (233 ft)
- Highest elevation: 103 m (338 ft)
- Lowest elevation: 45 m (148 ft)
- Population (2023): 896
  - Density: 34.7/km^{2} (89.9/sq mi)
- Demonym(s): Louressiens, Louressois
- Time zone: UTC+01:00 (CET)
  - Summer (DST): UTC+02:00 (CEST)
- INSEE/Postal code: 49182 /49700
- ^{1} French Land Register data, which excludes lakes, ponds, glaciers > 1 km^{2} (0.386 sq mi or 247 acres) and river estuaries.

Louresse-Rochemenier (French pronunciation: [luʁɛs ʁɔʃmənje]) is a commune in the Maine-et-Loire department in western France.

== See also ==
- Communes of the Maine-et-Loire department
