= Brossay =

- Commune
- Location of Brossay
- Location within France Location within Pays de la Loire
- Coordinates: 47°09′54″N 0°12′37″W
- Country: France
- Region: Pays de la Loire
- Department: Maine-et-Loire
- Arrondissement: Saumur
- Canton: Doué-en-Anjou
- Intercommunality: CA Saumur Val de Loire

Government
  - Mayor (2020–2026): Gilles Roussillat
- Area^{1}: 4.79 km^{2} (1.85 sq mi)
- Elevation: 83 m (272 ft)
- Highest elevation: 94 m (308 ft)
- Lowest elevation: 55 m (180 ft)
- Population (2023): 340
  - Density: 71/km^{2} (180/sq mi)
- Time zone: UTC+01:00 (CET)
  - Summer (DST): UTC+02:00 (CEST)
- INSEE/Postal code: 49053 /49700
- ^{1} French Land Register data, which excludes lakes, ponds, glaciers > 1 km^{2} (0.386 sq mi or 247 acres) and river estuaries.

Brossay (French pronunciation: [bʁɔsɛ]) is a commune in the Maine-et-Loire department in western France.

== Population ==
Historical population
Year	Pop.	±% p.a.
1968	289	—
1975	337	+2.22%
1982	280	−2.61%
1990	300	+0.87%
1999	243	−2.31%
2007	299	+2.63%
2012	354	+3.43%
2017	364	+0.56%
2023	340	−1.13%
Source: INSEE

== See also ==
- Communes of the Maine-et-Loire department
