= Turquant =

- Commune
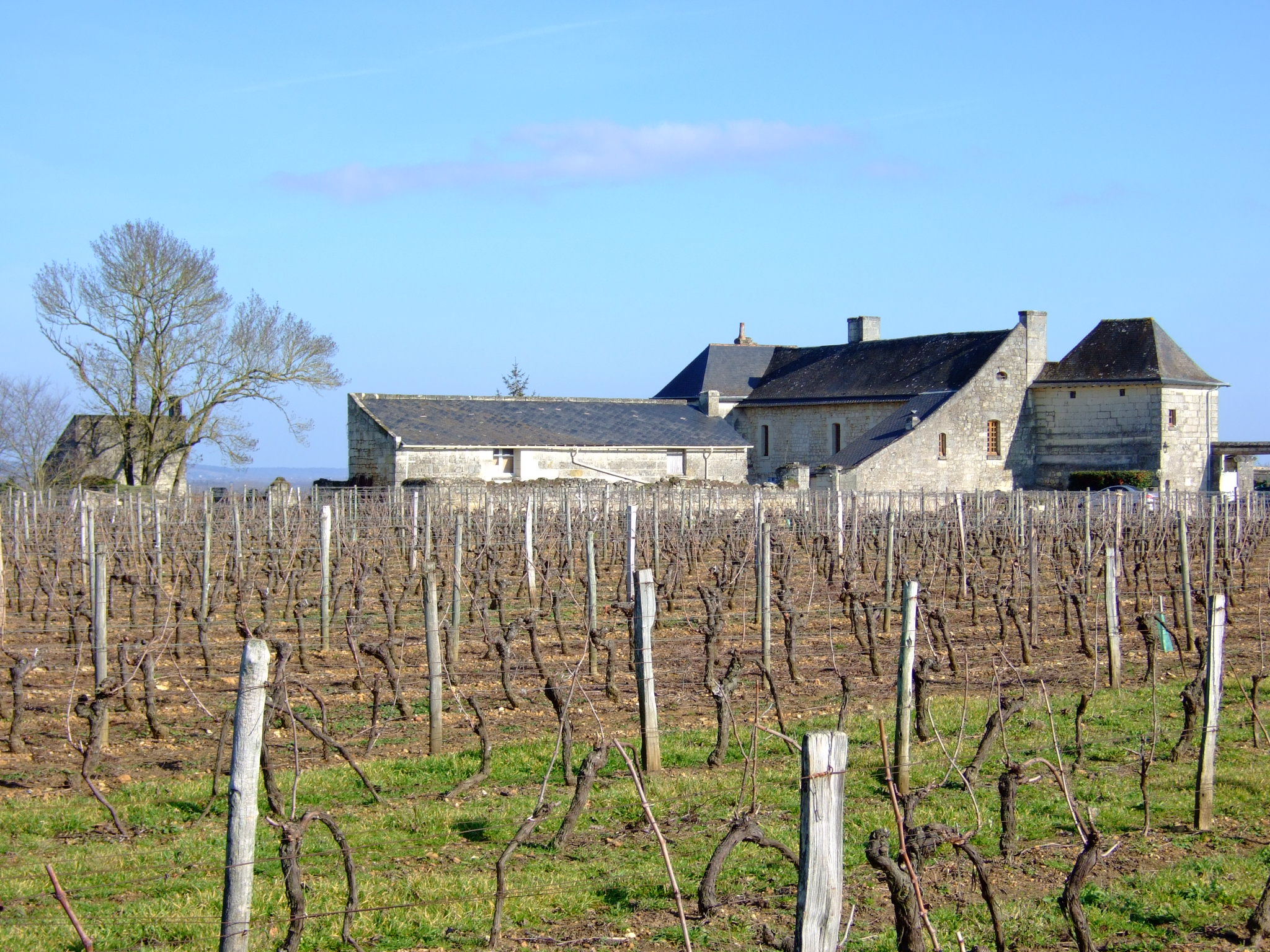
- At the vineyard, on the edge of Parnay
- Location of Turquant
- Location within France Location within Pays de la Loire
- Coordinates: 47°13′23″N 0°01′41″E
- Country: France
- Region: Pays de la Loire
- Department: Maine-et-Loire
- Arrondissement: Saumur
- Canton: Saumur
- Intercommunality: CA Saumur Val de Loire

Government
  - Mayor (2020–2026): Christian Gallé
- Area^{1}: 7.86 km^{2} (3.03 sq mi)
- Elevation: 42 m (138 ft)
- Highest elevation: 103 m (338 ft)
- Lowest elevation: 26 m (85 ft)
- Population (2023): 566
  - Density: 72.0/km^{2} (187/sq mi)
- Time zone: UTC+01:00 (CET)
  - Summer (DST): UTC+02:00 (CEST)
- INSEE/Postal code: 49358 /49730
- ^{1} French Land Register data, which excludes lakes, ponds, glaciers > 1 km^{2} (0.386 sq mi or 247 acres) and river estuaries.

Turquant (French pronunciation: [tyʁkɑ̃]) is a commune in the Maine-et-Loire department in western France.

== See also ==
- Communes of the Maine-et-Loire department

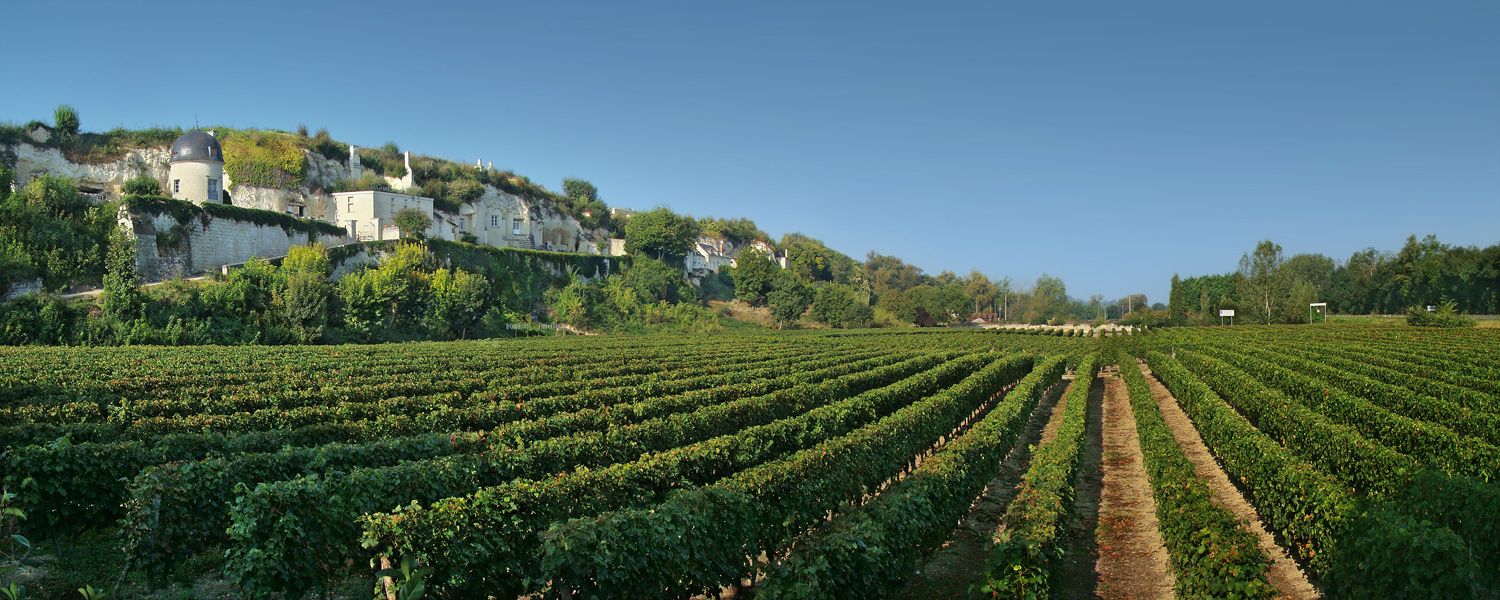
Vineyards and troglodytic houses along route D947
