= Canton of Saumur =

Administrative region in France

Coordinates: 47.26°N 0.08°W

The canton of Saumur is an administrative division of the Maine-et-Loire department, in western France. It was created at the French canton reorganisation which came into effect in March 2015. Its seat is in Saumur.

It consists of the following communes:

1. Artannes-sur-Thouet
2. Distré
3. Fontevraud-l'Abbaye
4. Montsoreau
5. Parnay
6. Rou-Marson
7. Saumur
8. Souzay-Champigny
9. Turquant
10. Varrains
11. Verrie
