= Communauté d'agglomération Saumur Val de Loire =

Coordinates: 47.26°N 0.0769°W

Saumur Val de Loire
- Communauté d'agglomération
- Location within the Maine-et-Loire department
- Country: France
- Region: Pays de la Loire
- Department: Maine-et-Loire
- No. of communes: {{{nbcomm}}}
- Established: January 2017

Government
  - President: Jean-Michel Marchand
- Area: 1,234 km^{2} (476 sq mi)
- Population (2018): 99,236
  - Density: 80.42/km^{2} (208.3/sq mi)
- Website: www.saumurvaldeloire.fr

The Communauté d'agglomération Saumur Val de Loire is an intercommunal structure in the Loire Valley gathering 45 communes including Saumur. It is located in the Maine-et-Loire département, in the Pays de la Loire région, western France. It was formed on 1 January 2017 by the merger of the former Communauté d'agglomération de Saumur Loire Développement, the Communauté de communes Loire Longué, the Communauté de communes du Gennois and the Communauté de communes de la région de Doué-la-Fontaine. Its area is 1233.7 km^{2}. Its population was 99,236 in 2018, of which 26,599 in Saumur proper.

== Composition ==
The Communauté d'agglomération de Saumur Val de Loire gathers 45 communes:

1. Saumur
2. Allonnes
3. Antoigné
4. Artannes-sur-Thouet
5. Bellevigne-les-Châteaux
6. Blou
7. Brain-sur-Allonnes
8. La Breille-les-Pins
9. Brossay
10. Cizay-la-Madeleine
11. Le Coudray-Macouard
12. Courchamps
13. Courléon
14. Dénezé-sous-Doué
15. Distré
16. Doué-en-Anjou
17. Épieds
18. Fontevraud-l'Abbaye
19. Gennes-Val-de-Loire
20. La Lande-Chasles
21. Longué-Jumelles
22. Louresse-Rochemenier
23. Montreuil-Bellay
24. Montsoreau
25. Mouliherne
26. Neuillé
27. Parnay
28. Le Puy-Notre-Dame
29. Rou-Marson
30. Saint-Clément-des-Levées
31. Saint-Just-sur-Dive
32. Saint-Macaire-du-Bois
33. Saint-Philbert-du-Peuple
34. Souzay-Champigny
35. Tuffalun
36. Turquant
37. Les Ulmes
38. Varennes-sur-Loire
39. Varrains
40. Vaudelnay
41. Vernantes
42. Vernoil-le-Fourrier
43. Verrie
44. Villebernier
45. Vivy
