= Villebernier =

- Commune
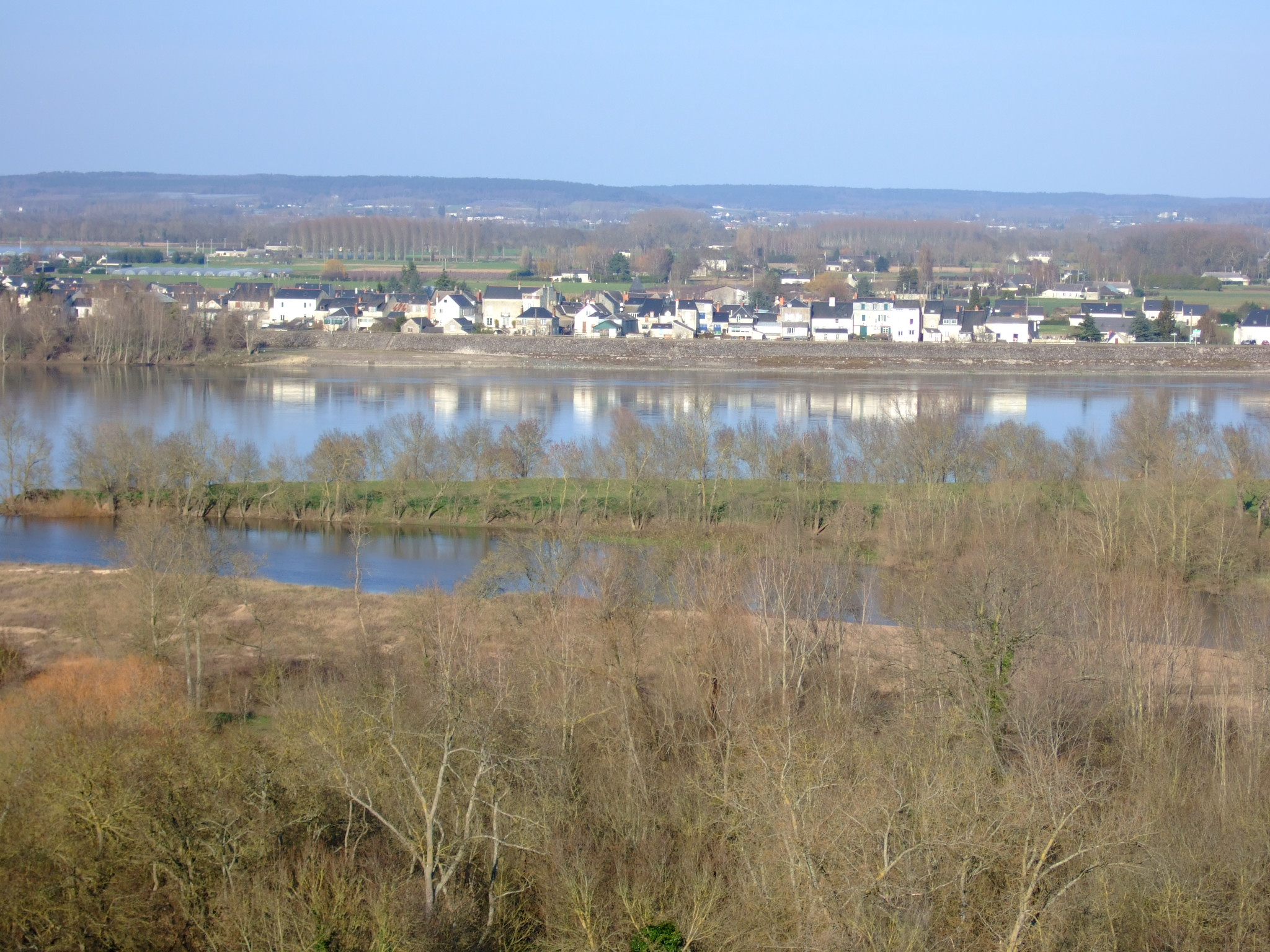
- A general view of Villebernier

- Coat of arms
- Location of Villebernier
- Location within France Location within Pays de la Loire
- Coordinates: 47°15′11″N 0°01′44″W
- Country: France
- Region: Pays de la Loire
- Department: Maine-et-Loire
- Arrondissement: Saumur
- Canton: Longué-Jumelles
- Intercommunality: CA Saumur Val de Loire

Government
  - Mayor (2020–2026): Jean-François Miglierina
- Area^{1}: 9.91 km^{2} (3.83 sq mi)
- Elevation: 32 m (105 ft)
- Highest elevation: 32 m (105 ft)
- Lowest elevation: 23 m (75 ft)
- Population (2023): 1,441
  - Density: 145/km^{2} (377/sq mi)
- Time zone: UTC+01:00 (CET)
  - Summer (DST): UTC+02:00 (CEST)
- INSEE/Postal code: 49374 /49400
- ^{1} French Land Register data, which excludes lakes, ponds, glaciers > 1 km^{2} (0.386 sq mi or 247 acres) and river estuaries.

Villebernier (French pronunciation: [vilbɛʁnje]) is a commune in the Maine-et-Loire department in western France. It is located on the Northern bank of the Loire river, between Angers and Tours.

A couple of architectural treasures can be found in the village. A Romanesque church and the manor of Launay was built by Roi René in 1414. The chapel Notre-Dame-des-Eaux, built in 1843 by priest Théar, has a unique round architecture.

In 2021, the village had 1,446 inhabitants.

== See also ==
- Communes of the Maine-et-Loire department
