= Verrie =

- Commune
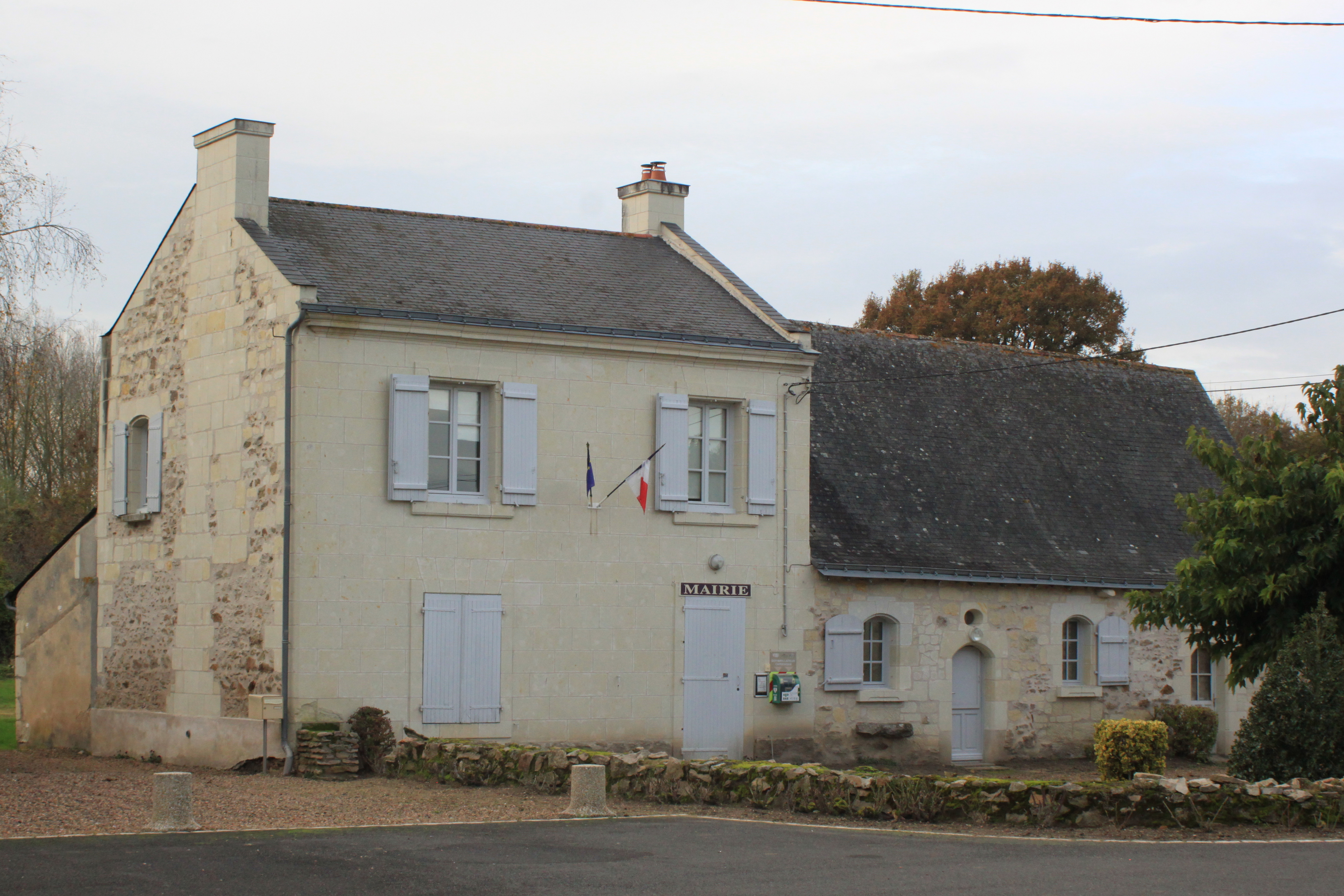
- The town hall of Verrie
- Location of Verrie
- Location within France Location within Pays de la Loire
- Coordinates: 47°15′58″N 0°10′41″W
- Country: France
- Region: Pays de la Loire
- Department: Maine-et-Loire
- Arrondissement: Saumur
- Canton: Saumur
- Intercommunality: CA Saumur Val de Loire

Government
  - Mayor (2020–2026): Gilles Bardin
- Area^{1}: 16.49 km^{2} (6.37 sq mi)
- Elevation: 74 m (243 ft)
- Highest elevation: 94 m (308 ft)
- Lowest elevation: 61 m (200 ft)
- Population (2023): 458
  - Density: 27.8/km^{2} (71.9/sq mi)
- Time zone: UTC+01:00 (CET)
  - Summer (DST): UTC+02:00 (CEST)
- INSEE/Postal code: 49370 /49400
- ^{1} French Land Register data, which excludes lakes, ponds, glaciers > 1 km^{2} (0.386 sq mi or 247 acres) and river estuaries.

Verrie (French pronunciation: [vɛʁi]) is a commune in the Maine-et-Loire department in western France.

Located in the historic region of Anjou, the commune is part of the administrative arrondissement and canton of Saumur. Verrie belongs to the intercommunal structure Communauté d'agglomération Saumur Val de Loire, which groups together several communes around the city of Saumur.

== Geography ==
Verrie is situated in the western part of the Maine-et-Loire department, within the Pays de la Loire region. The commune covers an area of 16.49 km² and its elevation ranges from 61 to 94 metres above sea level, with the municipal centre located at approximately 74 metres.

The commune is located near Saumur, one of the principal towns of the surrounding area, and forms part of the wider Saumur area.

== Administration ==
Verrie is administered by a municipal council headed by a mayor. Gilles Bardin has served as mayor for the 2020–2026 municipal term.

Administratively, Verrie is part of:

- the arrondissement of Saumur;
- the canton of Saumur;
- the intercommunality Communauté d'agglomération Saumur Val de Loire.

== Population ==
The population of Verrie is recorded by INSEE, the French National Institute of Statistics and Economic Studies. Population figures are updated periodically according to official French census data.

== Places of interest ==
The town hall of Verrie is one of the notable municipal buildings in the commune.

== See also ==
- Communes of the Maine-et-Loire department
- Saumur
- Maine-et-Loire
