= Saint-Macaire-du-Bois =

- Commune
- Location of Saint-Macaire-du-Bois
- Location within France Location within Pays de la Loire
- Coordinates: 47°07′05″N 0°17′14″W
- Country: France
- Region: Pays de la Loire
- Department: Maine-et-Loire
- Arrondissement: Saumur
- Canton: Doué-en-Anjou
- Intercommunality: CA Saumur Val de Loire

Government
  - Mayor (2020–2026): Pierre de Boutray
- Area^{1}: 13.06 km^{2} (5.04 sq mi)
- Elevation: 50 m (160 ft)
- Highest elevation: 86 m (282 ft)
- Lowest elevation: 43 m (141 ft)
- Population (2023): 439
  - Density: 33.6/km^{2} (87.1/sq mi)
- Time zone: UTC+01:00 (CET)
  - Summer (DST): UTC+02:00 (CEST)
- INSEE/Postal code: 49302 /49260
- ^{1} French Land Register data, which excludes lakes, ponds, glaciers > 1 km^{2} (0.386 sq mi or 247 acres) and river estuaries.

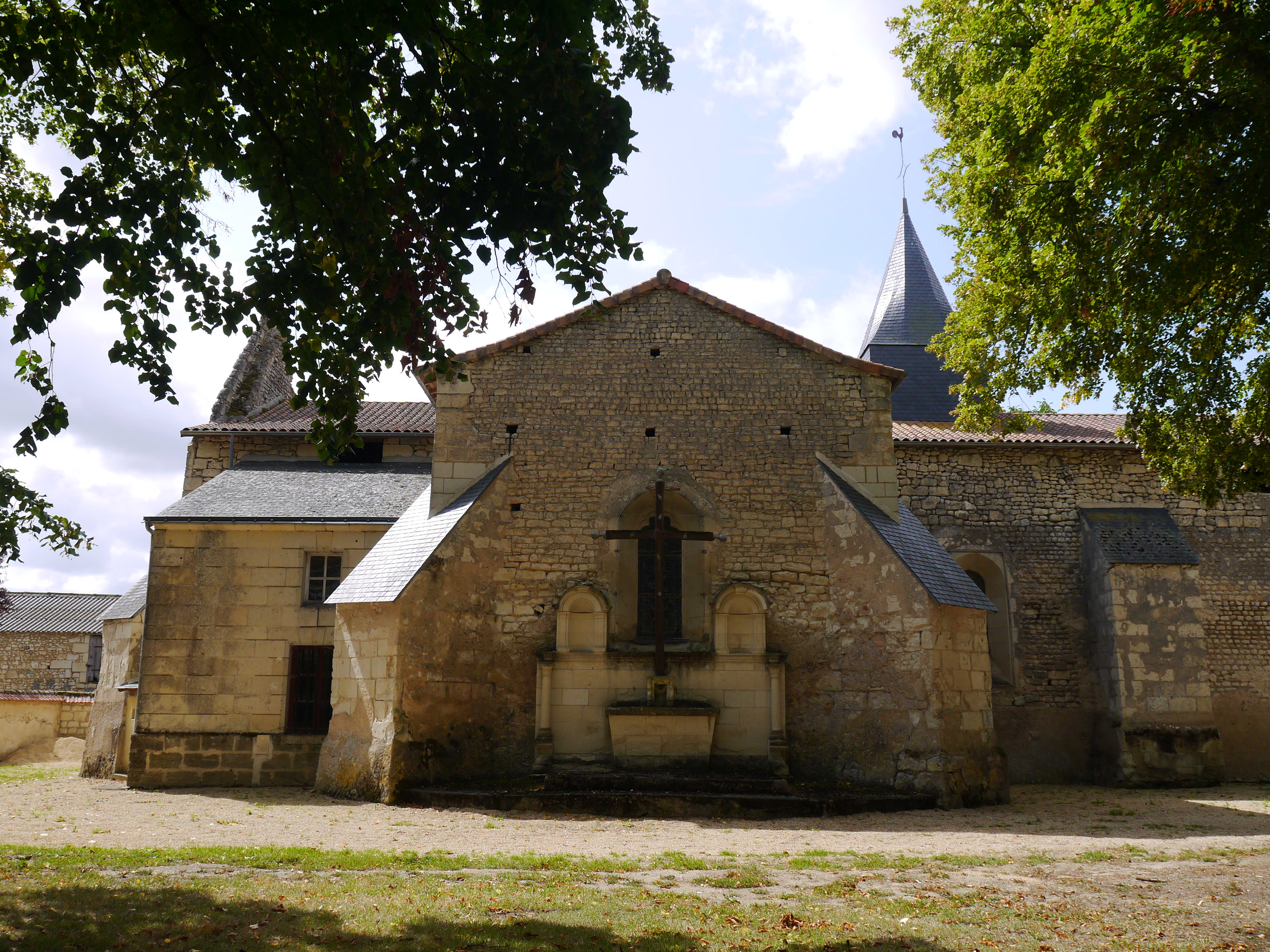
Saint-Macaire-du-Bois église

Saint-Macaire-du-Bois (French pronunciation: [sɛ̃ makɛʁ dy bwa]) is a commune in the Maine-et-Loire department in western France.

== See also ==
- Communes of the Maine-et-Loire department
