= Cizay-la-Madeleine =

- Commune
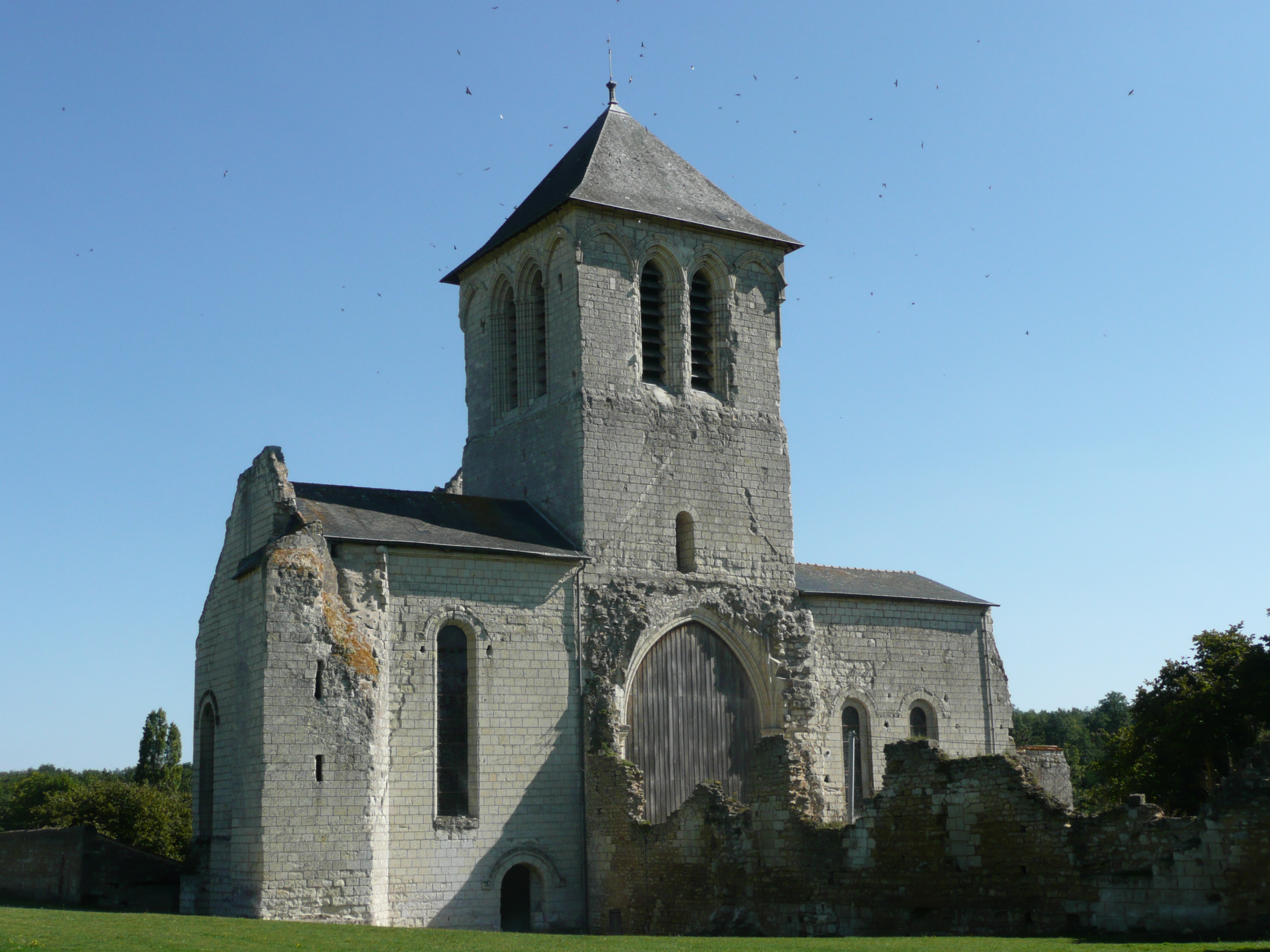
- The priory in Cizay-la-Madeleine
- Location of Cizay-la-Madeleine
- Location within France Location within Pays de la Loire
- Coordinates: 47°11′22″N 0°11′10″W
- Country: France
- Region: Pays de la Loire
- Department: Maine-et-Loire
- Arrondissement: Saumur
- Canton: Doué-en-Anjou
- Intercommunality: CA Saumur Val de Loire

Government
  - Mayor (2020–2026): Isabelle Grandhomme
- Area^{1}: 19.29 km^{2} (7.45 sq mi)
- Elevation: 74 m (243 ft)
- Highest elevation: 109 m (358 ft)
- Lowest elevation: 39 m (128 ft)
- Population (2023): 473
  - Density: 24.5/km^{2} (63.5/sq mi)
- Time zone: UTC+01:00 (CET)
  - Summer (DST): UTC+02:00 (CEST)
- INSEE/Postal code: 49100 /49700
- ^{1} French Land Register data, which excludes lakes, ponds, glaciers > 1 km^{2} (0.386 sq mi or 247 acres) and river estuaries.

Cizay-la-Madeleine (French pronunciation: [sizɛ la madlɛn]) is a commune in the Maine-et-Loire department in western France.

== See also ==
- Communes of the Maine-et-Loire department
