= Allonnes, Maine-et-Loire =

Allonnes
- Commune
- Coat of arms
- Location of Allonnes
- Location within France Location within Pays de la Loire
- Coordinates: 47°17′38″N 0°01′28″E
- Country: France
- Region: Pays de la Loire
- Department: Maine-et-Loire
- Arrondissement: Saumur
- Canton: Longué-Jumelles
- Intercommunality: CA Saumur Val de Loire

Government
  - Mayor (2020–2026): Jérôme Harrault
- Area^{1}: 36.33 km^{2} (14.03 sq mi)
- Elevation: 27 m (89 ft)
- Highest elevation: 110 m (360 ft)
- Lowest elevation: 23 m (75 ft)
- Population (2023): 2,911
  - Density: 80.13/km^{2} (207.5/sq mi)
- Time zone: UTC+01:00 (CET)
  - Summer (DST): UTC+02:00 (CEST)
- INSEE/Postal code: 49002 /49650
- ^{1} French Land Register data, which excludes lakes, ponds, glaciers > 1 km^{2} (0.386 sq mi or 247 acres) and river estuaries.

Allonnes (French pronunciation: [alɔn]) is a commune in the Maine-et-Loire department in western France. The village is located North of the town of Saumur, and the small river Authion passes through it.

== Population ==
Historical population

Year	Pop.	±% p.a.
1793	1,500	—
1821	2,062	+1.14%
1846	2,514	+0.80%
1872	2,320	−0.31%
1901	2,038	−0.45%
1926	1,812	−0.47%
1946	1,956	+0.38%
1962	2,185	+0.69%
1968	2,253	+0.51%

Year	Pop.	±% p.a.
1975	2,302	+0.31%
1982	2,490	+1.13%
1990	2,498	+0.04%
1999	2,558	+0.26%
2007	2,911	+1.63%
2012	2,974	+0.43%
2017	3,029	+0.37%
2023	2,911	−0.66%

Source: EHESS and INSEE (1968-2023)

== See also ==
- Communes of the Maine-et-Loire department
