= Blou, Maine-et-Loire =

Blou
- Commune
- Location of Blou
- Location within France Location within Pays de la Loire
- Coordinates: 47°21′47″N 0°02′10″W
- Country: France
- Region: Pays de la Loire
- Department: Maine-et-Loire
- Arrondissement: Saumur
- Canton: Longué-Jumelles
- Intercommunality: CA Saumur Val de Loire

Government
  - Mayor (2020–2026): Jean-Philippe Retif
- Area^{1}: 21.46 km^{2} (8.29 sq mi)
- Elevation: 67 m (220 ft)
- Highest elevation: 111 m (364 ft)
- Lowest elevation: 23 m (75 ft)
- Population (2023): 929
  - Density: 43.3/km^{2} (112/sq mi)
- Time zone: UTC+01:00 (CET)
  - Summer (DST): UTC+02:00 (CEST)
- INSEE/Postal code: 49030 /49160
- ^{1} French Land Register data, which excludes lakes, ponds, glaciers > 1 km^{2} (0.386 sq mi or 247 acres) and river estuaries.

Blou (French pronunciation: [blu]) is a commune in the Maine-et-Loire department in western France.

== Population ==
Historical population
Year	Pop.	±% p.a.
1968	867	—
1975	823	−0.74%
1982	799	−0.42%
1990	752	−0.75%
1999	824	+1.02%
2007	963	+1.97%
2012	1,030	+1.35%
2017	994	−0.71%
2023	929	−1.12%
Source: INSEE

== See also ==
- Communes of the Maine-et-Loire department
