= Canton of Longué-Jumelles =

Administrative division of Maine-et-Loire, France

Coordinates: 47.38°N 0.11°W

The canton of Longué-Jumelles is an administrative division of the Maine-et-Loire department, in western France. Its borders were modified at the French canton reorganisation which came into effect in March 2015. Its seat is in Longué-Jumelles.

It consists of the following communes:

1. Allonnes
2. Blou
3. Brain-sur-Allonnes
4. La Breille-les-Pins
5. Courléon
6. Gennes-Val-de-Loire (partly)
7. La Lande-Chasles
8. Longué-Jumelles
9. Mouliherne
10. Neuillé
11. Saint-Clément-des-Levées
12. Saint-Philbert-du-Peuple
13. Varennes-sur-Loire
14. Vernantes
15. Vernoil-le-Fourrier
16. Villebernier
17. Vivy
