= Saint-Léger-des-Bois =

- Part of Saint-Léger-de-Linières
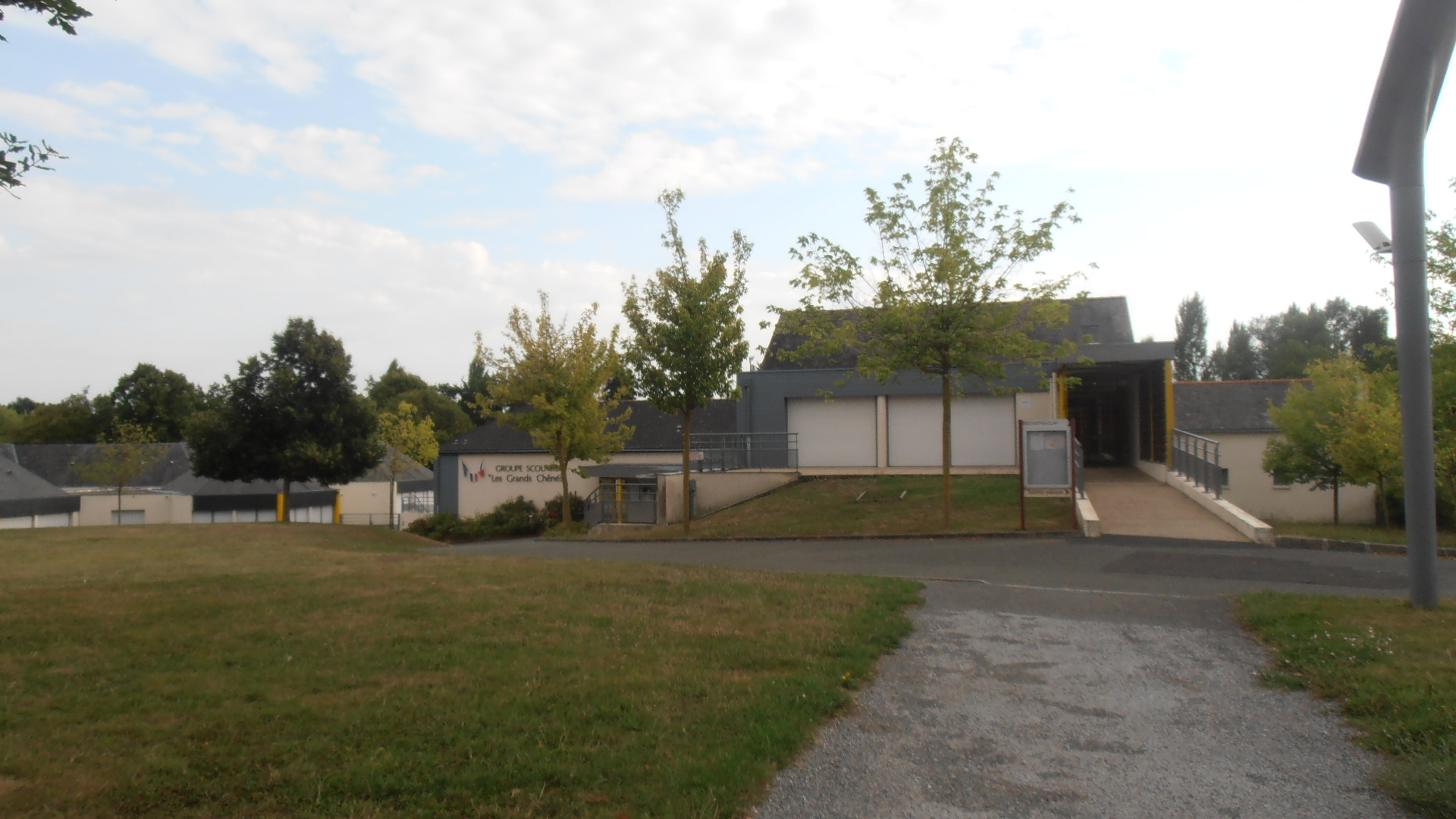
- The school and library
- Location of Saint-Léger-des-Bois
- Location within France Location within Pays de la Loire
- Coordinates: 47°27′40″N 0°42′25″W
- Country: France
- Region: Pays de la Loire
- Department: Maine-et-Loire
- Arrondissement: Angers
- Canton: Angers-3
- Commune: Saint-Léger-de-Linières
- Area^{1}: 15.42 km^{2} (5.95 sq mi)
- Elevation: 79 m (259 ft)
- Highest elevation: 79 m (259 ft)
- Lowest elevation: 38 m (125 ft)
- Population (2022): 2,027
  - Density: 131.5/km^{2} (340.5/sq mi)
- Time zone: UTC+01:00 (CET)
  - Summer (DST): UTC+02:00 (CEST)
- Postal code: 49170
- ^{1} French Land Register data, which excludes lakes, ponds, glaciers > 1 km^{2} (0.386 sq mi or 247 acres) and river estuaries.

Saint-Léger-des-Bois (French pronunciation: [sɛ̃ leʒe de bwa]) is a former commune in the Maine-et-Loire department in western France. On 1 January 2019, it was merged into the new commune Saint-Léger-de-Linières.

== See also ==
- Communes of the Maine-et-Loire department
