= Saint-Jean-de-Linières =

- Part of Saint-Léger-de-Linières
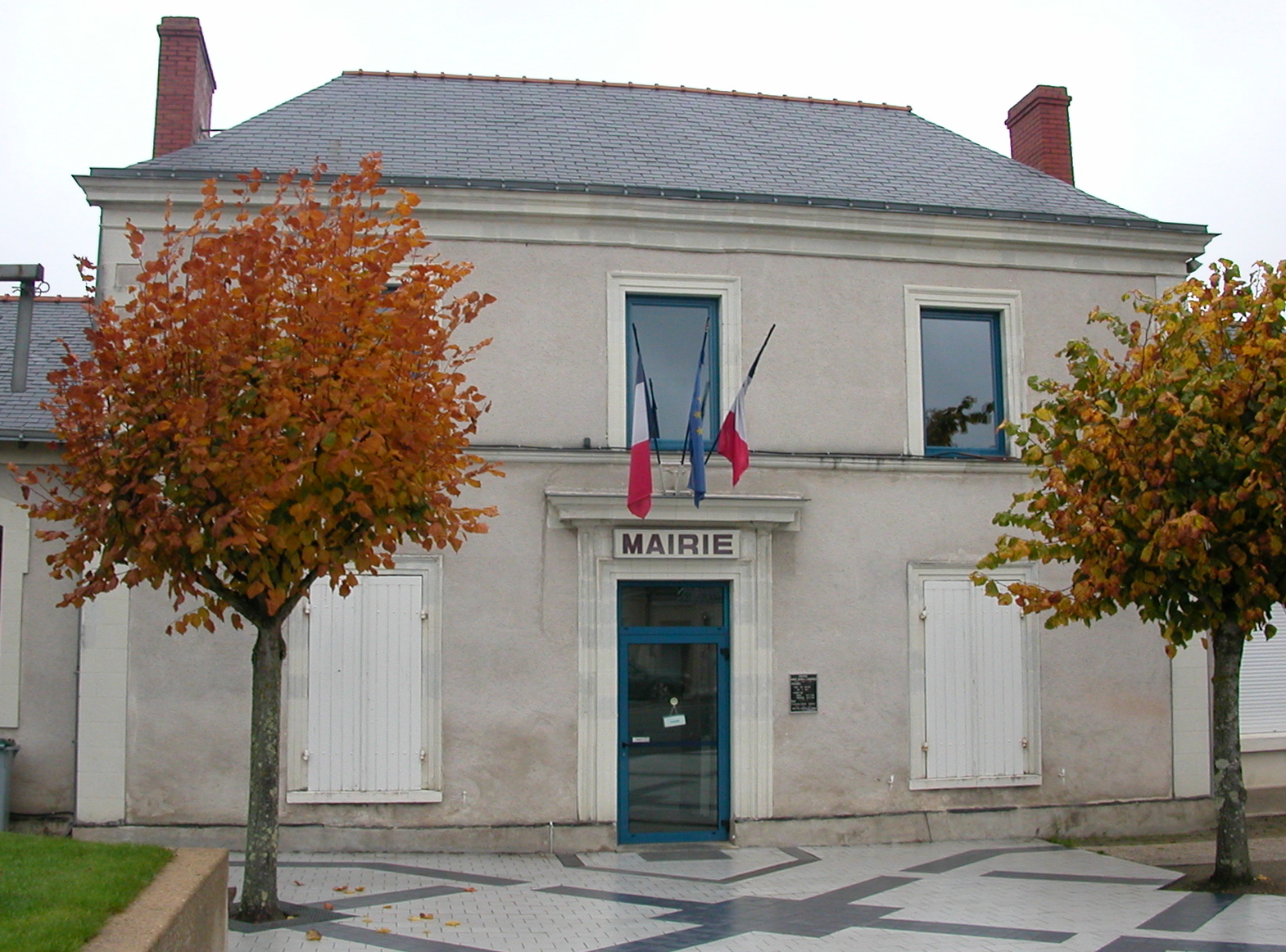
- The town hall of Saint-Jean-de-Linières
- Location of Saint-Jean-de-Linières
- Location within France Location within Pays de la Loire
- Coordinates: 47°27′29″N 0°39′22″W
- Country: France
- Region: Pays de la Loire
- Department: Maine-et-Loire
- Arrondissement: Angers
- Canton: Angers-3
- Commune: Saint-Léger-de-Linières
- Area^{1}: 8.66 km^{2} (3.34 sq mi)
- Elevation: 72 m (236 ft)
- Highest elevation: 79 m (259 ft)
- Lowest elevation: 29 m (95 ft)
- Population (2022): 1,833
  - Density: 212/km^{2} (548/sq mi)
- Time zone: UTC+01:00 (CET)
  - Summer (DST): UTC+02:00 (CEST)
- Postal code: 49070
- ^{1} French Land Register data, which excludes lakes, ponds, glaciers > 1 km^{2} (0.386 sq mi or 247 acres) and river estuaries.

Saint-Jean-de-Linières (French pronunciation: [sɛ̃ ʒɑ̃ də linjɛʁ]) is a former commune in the Maine-et-Loire department in western France. On 1 January 2019, it was merged into the new commune Saint-Léger-de-Linières.

== See also ==
- Communes of the Maine-et-Loire department
