= Montigné-lès-Rairies =

- Commune
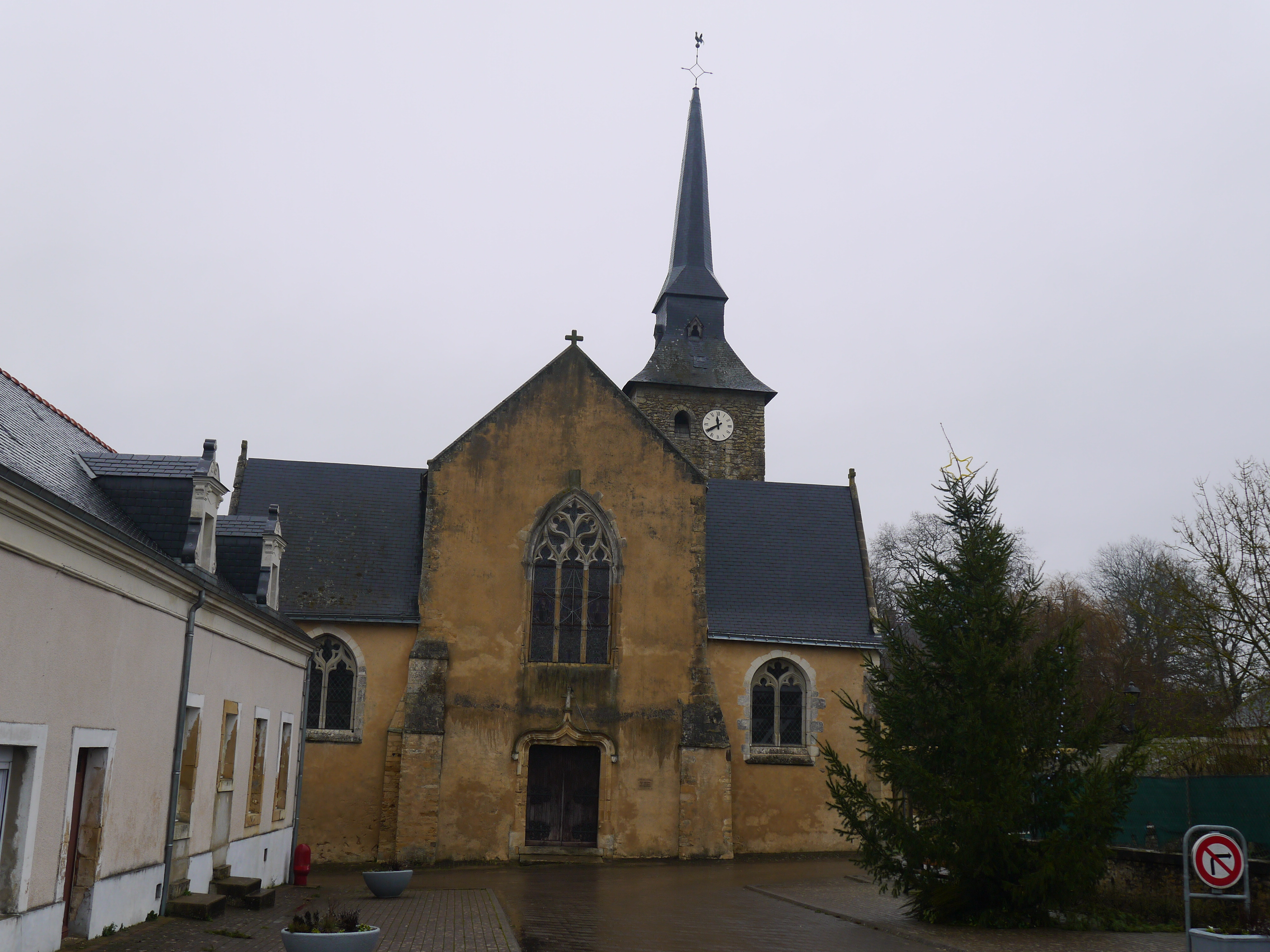
- The church of Saint-Pierre
- Location of Montigné-lès-Rairies
- Location within France Location within Pays de la Loire
- Coordinates: 47°37′16″N 0°12′05″W
- Country: France
- Region: Pays de la Loire
- Department: Maine-et-Loire
- Arrondissement: Angers
- Canton: Tiercé

Government
  - Mayor (2020–2026): Gérard Chassoulier
- Area^{1}: 9.01 km^{2} (3.48 sq mi)
- Highest elevation: 76 m (249 ft)
- Lowest elevation: 28 m (92 ft)
- Population (2023): 418
  - Density: 46.4/km^{2} (120/sq mi)
- Demonym(s): Ignémontain, Ignémontaine
- Time zone: UTC+01:00 (CET)
  - Summer (DST): UTC+02:00 (CEST)
- INSEE/Postal code: 49209 /49430
- ^{1} French Land Register data, which excludes lakes, ponds, glaciers > 1 km^{2} (0.386 sq mi or 247 acres) and river estuaries.

Montigné-lès-Rairies (French pronunciation: [mɔ̃tiɲe lɛ ʁɛʁi], literally Montigné near Rairies) is a commune in the Maine-et-Loire department in western France.

== See also ==
- Communes of the Maine-et-Loire department
