= Soulaire-et-Bourg =

- Commune
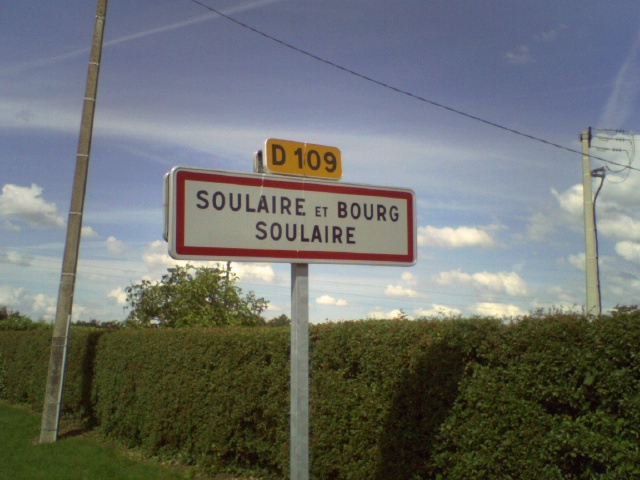
- Panneau d'entrée de la commune en provenance de Feneu.
- Location of Soulaire-et-Bourg
- Location within France Location within Pays de la Loire
- Coordinates: 47°34′48″N 0°33′06″W
- Country: France
- Region: Pays de la Loire
- Department: Maine-et-Loire
- Arrondissement: Angers
- Canton: Angers-5
- Intercommunality: CU Angers Loire Métropole

Government
  - Mayor (2020–2026): Jean-François Raimbault
- Area^{1}: 18.08 km^{2} (6.98 sq mi)
- Highest elevation: 59 m (194 ft)
- Lowest elevation: 14 m (46 ft)
- Population (2023): 1,467
  - Density: 81.14/km^{2} (210.2/sq mi)
- Demonym(s): Soleirébourgien, Soléirébourgienne
- Time zone: UTC+01:00 (CET)
  - Summer (DST): UTC+02:00 (CEST)
- INSEE/Postal code: 49339 /49460
- ^{1} French Land Register data, which excludes lakes, ponds, glaciers > 1 km^{2} (0.386 sq mi or 247 acres) and river estuaries.

Soulaire-et-Bourg (French pronunciation: [sulɛʁ e buʁ]) is a commune in the Maine-et-Loire department in western France.

== See also ==
- Communes of the Maine-et-Loire department
