= Écouflant =

- Commune
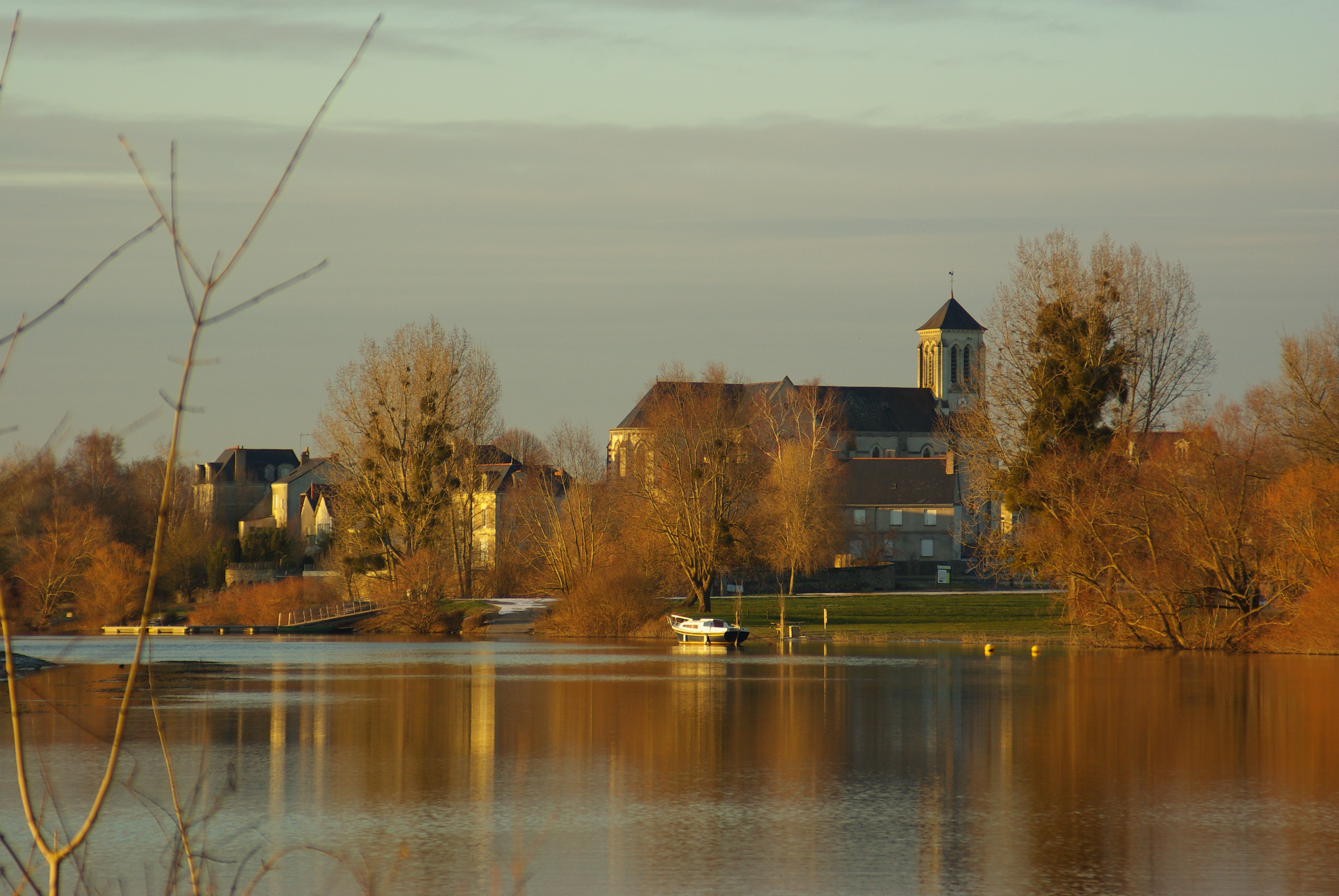
- A general view of Écouflant
- Location of Écouflant
- Location within France Location within Pays de la Loire
- Coordinates: 47°31′48″N 0°31′47″W
- Country: France
- Region: Pays de la Loire
- Department: Maine-et-Loire
- Arrondissement: Angers
- Canton: Angers-5
- Intercommunality: CU Angers Loire Métropole

Government
  - Mayor (2020–2026): Denis Chimier
- Area^{1}: 17.02 km^{2} (6.57 sq mi)
- Elevation: 32 m (105 ft)
- Highest elevation: 50 m (160 ft)
- Lowest elevation: 12 m (39 ft)
- Population (2023): 4,749
  - Density: 279.0/km^{2} (722.7/sq mi)
- Demonym(s): Ecouflantais, Ecouflantaise
- Time zone: UTC+01:00 (CET)
  - Summer (DST): UTC+02:00 (CEST)
- INSEE/Postal code: 49129 /49000
- ^{1} French Land Register data, which excludes lakes, ponds, glaciers > 1 km^{2} (0.386 sq mi or 247 acres) and river estuaries.

Écouflant (French pronunciation: [ekuflɑ̃]) is a commune in the Maine-et-Loire department in western France. It is around 5 km north of Angers.

== Population ==
Historical population
Year	Pop.	±% p.a.
1968	888	—
1975	3,209	+20.15%
1982	3,233	+0.11%
1990	3,361	+0.49%
1999	3,703	+1.08%
2007	3,747	+0.15%
2012	3,775	+0.15%
2017	4,159	+1.96%
2023	4,749	+2.24%
Source: INSEE

== See also ==
- Communes of the Maine-et-Loire department
