= Sceaux-d'Anjou =

- Commune
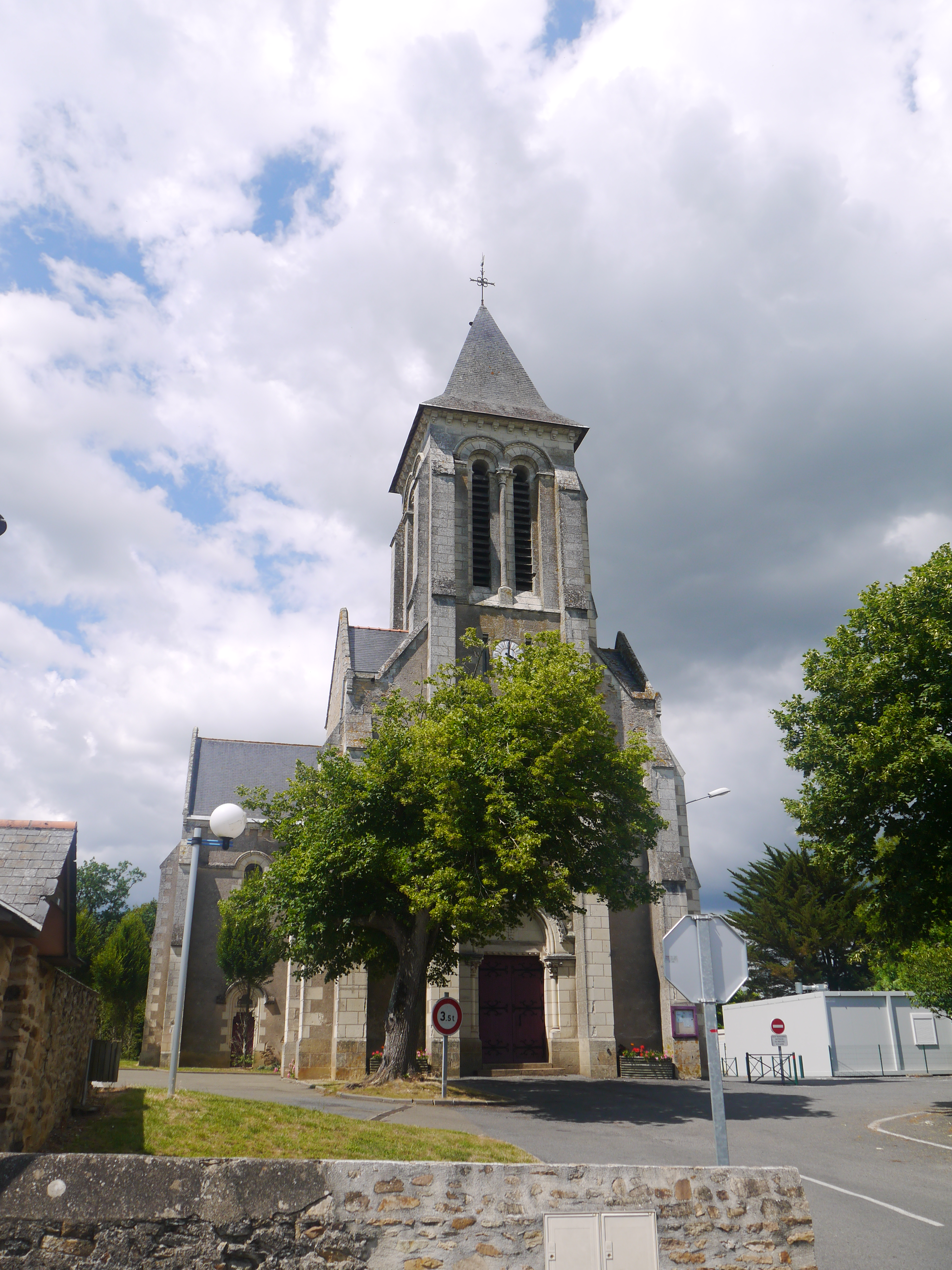
- The church of Saint-Martin-de-Vertou
- Location of Sceaux-d'Anjou
- Location within France Location within Pays de la Loire
- Coordinates: 47°37′20″N 0°36′19″W
- Country: France
- Region: Pays de la Loire
- Department: Maine-et-Loire
- Arrondissement: Segré
- Canton: Tiercé

Government
  - Mayor (2020–2026): Joël Esnault
- Area^{1}: 17.18 km^{2} (6.63 sq mi)
- Elevation: 38 m (125 ft)
- Highest elevation: 71 m (233 ft)
- Lowest elevation: 32 m (105 ft)
- Population (2023): 1,155
  - Density: 67.23/km^{2} (174.1/sq mi)
- Demonym(s): Salcien, Salcienne
- Time zone: UTC+01:00 (CET)
  - Summer (DST): UTC+02:00 (CEST)
- INSEE/Postal code: 49330 /49330
- ^{1} French Land Register data, which excludes lakes, ponds, glaciers > 1 km^{2} (0.386 sq mi or 247 acres) and river estuaries.

Sceaux-d'Anjou (French pronunciation: [so dɑ̃ʒu]) is a commune in the Maine-et-Loire department in western France.

== See also ==
- Communes of the Maine-et-Loire department
