= Saint-Léger-de-Linières =

- Commune
- Location of Saint-Léger-de-Linières
- Location within France Location within Pays de la Loire
- Coordinates: 47°27′40″N 0°42′25″W
- Country: France
- Region: Pays de la Loire
- Department: Maine-et-Loire
- Arrondissement: Angers
- Canton: Angers-3
- Intercommunality: CU Angers Loire Métropole

Government
  - Mayor (2020–2026): Franck Poquin
- Area^{1}: 24.08 km^{2} (9.30 sq mi)
- Highest elevation: 79 m (259 ft)
- Lowest elevation: 29 m (95 ft)
- Population (2023): 3,866
  - Density: 160.5/km^{2} (415.8/sq mi)
- Time zone: UTC+01:00 (CET)
  - Summer (DST): UTC+02:00 (CEST)
- INSEE/Postal code: 49298 /49170
- ^{1} French Land Register data, which excludes lakes, ponds, glaciers > 1 km^{2} (0.386 sq mi or 247 acres) and river estuaries.

Saint-Léger-de-Linières (French pronunciation: [sɛ̃ leʒe də linjɛʁ]) is a commune in the Maine-et-Loire department in western France. It was established on 1 January 2019 by merger of the former communes of Saint-Léger-des-Bois (the seat) and Saint-Jean-de-Linières.

== Population ==
Population data refer to the area corresponding with the commune as of January 2025.

Historical population
Year	Pop.	±% p.a.
1968	647	—
1975	962	+5.83%
1982	1,346	+4.92%
1990	1,986	+4.98%
1999	2,707	+3.50%
2007	3,041	+1.46%
2012	3,342	+1.91%
2017	3,597	+1.48%
2023	3,866	+1.21%
Source: INSEE

== See also ==
- Communes of the Maine-et-Loire department
