= Bouchemaine =

- Commune
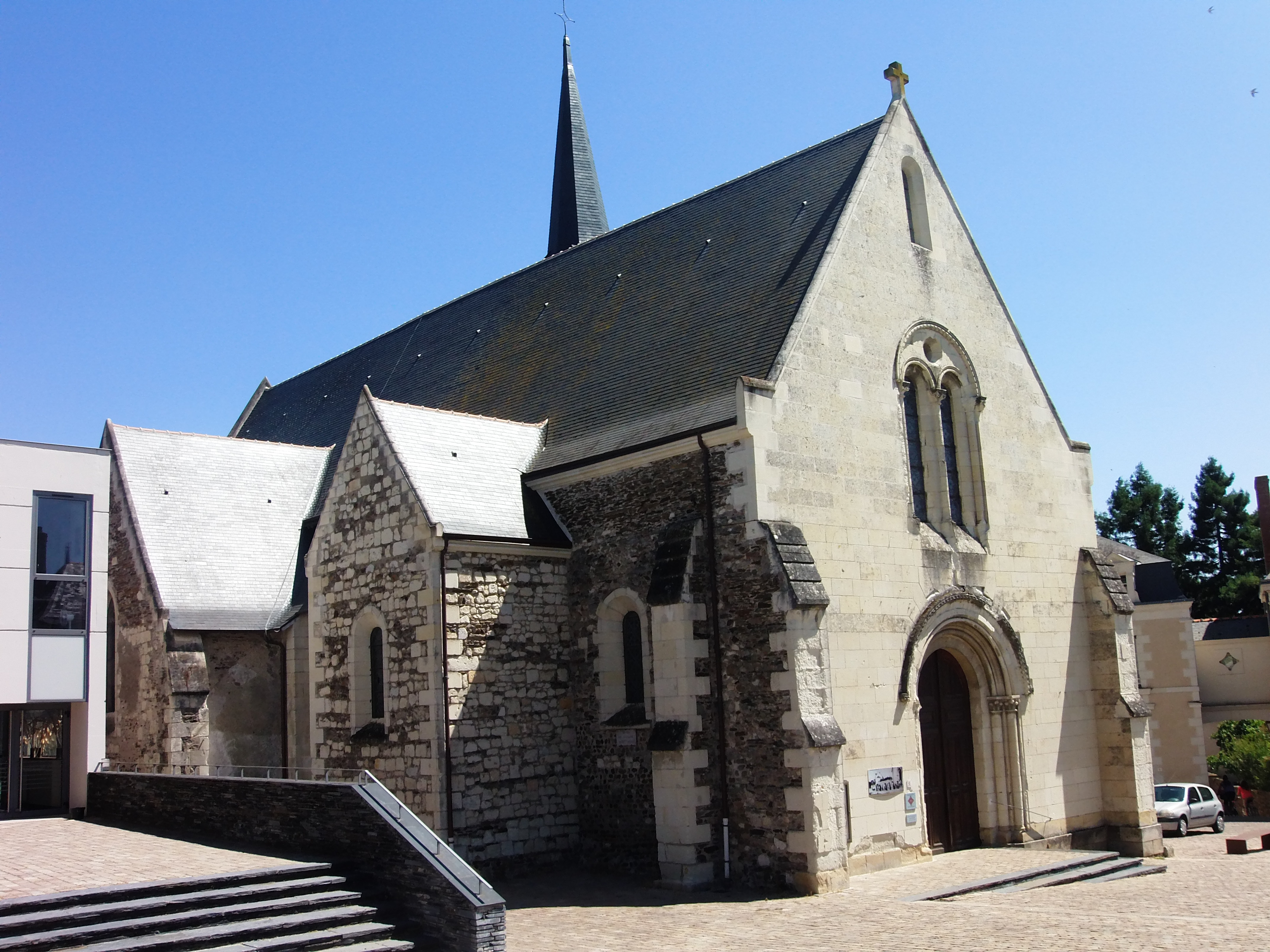
- The church of St Symphorien in Bouchemaine

- Coat of arms
- Location of Bouchemaine
- Location within France Location within Pays de la Loire
- Coordinates: 47°25′24″N 0°36′30″W
- Country: France
- Region: Pays de la Loire
- Department: Maine-et-Loire
- Arrondissement: Angers
- Canton: Angers-2
- Intercommunality: CU Angers Loire Métropole

Government
  - Mayor (2020–2026): Véronique Maillet
- Area^{1}: 19.81 km^{2} (7.65 sq mi)
- Elevation: 26 m (85 ft)
- Highest elevation: 73 m (240 ft)
- Lowest elevation: 11 m (36 ft)
- Population (2023): 6,580
  - Density: 332/km^{2} (860/sq mi)
- Time zone: UTC+01:00 (CET)
  - Summer (DST): UTC+02:00 (CEST)
- INSEE/Postal code: 49035 /49080
- ^{1} French Land Register data, which excludes lakes, ponds, glaciers > 1 km^{2} (0.386 sq mi or 247 acres) and river estuaries.

Bouchemaine (French pronunciation: [buʃmɛn]) is a commune in the Maine-et-Loire department in western France.

== Population ==
Historical population

Year	Pop.	±% p.a.
1793	830	—
1800	1,151	+4.78%
1806	1,235	+1.18%
1821	1,319	+0.44%
1831	1,333	+0.11%
1836	1,229	−1.61%
1841	1,220	−0.15%
1846	1,307	+1.39%
1851	1,386	+1.18%
1856	1,226	−2.42%
1861	1,197	−0.48%
1866	1,166	−0.52%
1872	1,159	−0.10%
1876	1,225	+1.39%
1881	1,141	−1.41%
1886	1,196	+0.95%
1891	1,216	+0.33%
1896	1,128	−1.49%
1901	1,201	+1.26%

Year	Pop.	±% p.a.
1906	1,209	+0.13%
1911	1,282	+1.18%
1921	1,182	−0.81%
1926	1,150	−0.55%
1931	1,155	+0.09%
1936	1,147	−0.14%
1946	1,266	+0.99%
1954	1,328	+0.60%
1962	1,282	−0.44%
1968	1,685	+4.66%
1975	3,223	+9.71%
1982	5,014	+6.52%
1990	5,799	+1.83%
1999	6,153	+0.66%
2007	5,886	−0.55%
2012	6,459	+1.88%
2017	6,774	+0.96%
2023	6,580	−0.48%

Source: EHESS and INSEE (1968-2023)

== See also ==
- Communes of the Maine-et-Loire department
