= Canton of Angers-Centre =

The Canton of Angers-Centre is a former French canton located in the Maine-et-Loire département of France, in the arrondissement of Angers. It had 35,190 inhabitants (2012). It was disbanded following the French canton reorganisation which came into effect in March 2015. It comprised part of the commune of Angers.

== See also ==
- Arrondissement of Angers
- Cantons of the Maine-et-Loire department
- Communes of the Maine-et-Loire department
