= Étriché =

- Commune
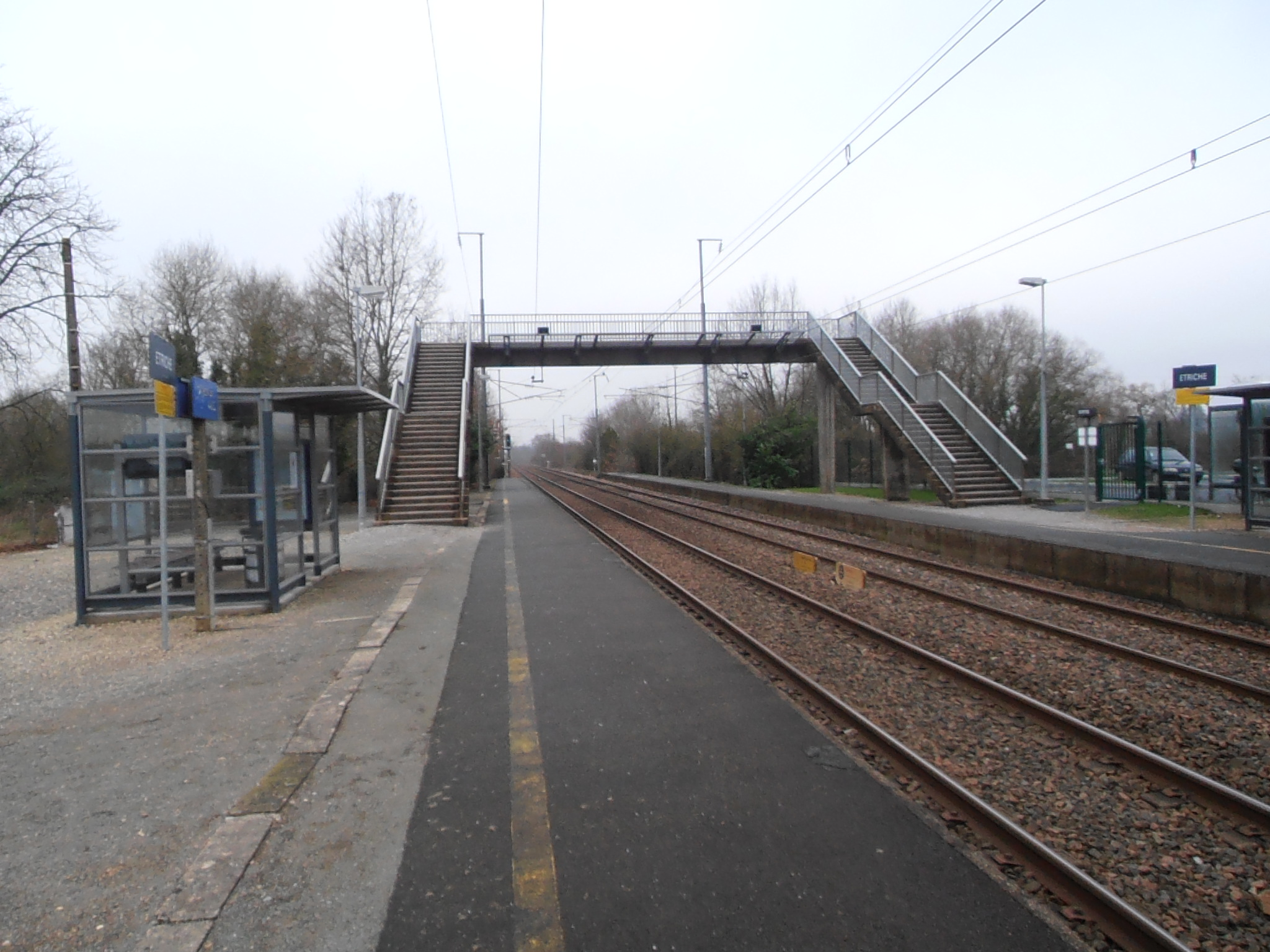
- Etriché-Châteauneuf railway station

- Coat of arms
- Location of Étriché
- Location within France Location within Pays de la Loire
- Coordinates: 47°39′06″N 0°26′38″W
- Country: France
- Region: Pays de la Loire
- Department: Maine-et-Loire
- Arrondissement: Angers
- Canton: Tiercé

Government
  - Mayor (2020–2026): David Lagleyze
- Area^{1}: 19.6 km^{2} (7.6 sq mi)
- Elevation: 25 m (82 ft)
- Highest elevation: 53 m (174 ft)
- Lowest elevation: 16 m (52 ft)
- Population (2023): 1,600
  - Density: 82/km^{2} (210/sq mi)
- Demonym(s): Etrichéen, Etrichéenne
- Time zone: UTC+01:00 (CET)
  - Summer (DST): UTC+02:00 (CEST)
- INSEE/Postal code: 49132 /49330
- ^{1} French Land Register data, which excludes lakes, ponds, glaciers > 1 km^{2} (0.386 sq mi or 247 acres) and river estuaries.

Étriché (French pronunciation: [etʁiʃe]) is a commune in the Maine-et-Loire department in western France.

== See also ==
- Communes of the Maine-et-Loire department
