= Angers Loire Métropole =

Coordinates: 47°30′N 0°33′W

- Communauté urbaine

- Location within the Maine-et-Loire department
- Country: France
- Region: Pays de la Loire
- Department: Maine-et-Loire
- No. of communes: {{{nbcomm}}}
- Established: 2016

Government
  - President: Christophe Béchu
- Area: 667 km^{2} (258 sq mi)
- Population (2018): 299,476
  - Density: 449/km^{2} (1,160/sq mi)
- Website: Angers Loire Métropole; Angers Developpement

The Communauté urbaine Angers Loire Métropole is the communauté urbaine, an intercommunal structure, centred on the city of Angers. It is located in the Maine-et-Loire department, in the Pays de la Loire region, western France. It was created in January 2016, replacing the previous Communauté d'agglomération d'Angers Loire Métropole. It was expanded with the commune of Loire-Authion in January 2018. Its area is 666.7 km^{2}. Its population was 299,476 in 2018, of which 154,508 in Angers proper.

== Composition ==
The Communauté urbaine Angers Loire Métropole gathers 29 communes:

1. Angers
2. Avrillé
3. Beaucouzé
4. Béhuard
5. Bouchemaine
6. Briollay
7. Cantenay-Épinard
8. Écouflant
9. Écuillé
10. Feneu
11. Loire-Authion
12. Longuenée-en-Anjou
13. Montreuil-Juigné
14. Mûrs-Erigné
15. Le Plessis-Grammoire
16. Les Ponts-de-Cé
17. Rives-du-Loir-en-Anjou
18. Saint-Barthélemy-d'Anjou
19. Saint-Clément-de-la-Place
20. Sainte-Gemmes-sur-Loire
21. Saint-Lambert-la-Potherie
22. Saint-Léger-de-Linières
23. Saint-Martin-du-Fouilloux
24. Sarrigné
25. Savennières
26. Soulaines-sur-Aubance
27. Soulaire-et-Bourg
28. Trélazé
29. Verrières-en-Anjou
