= Saint-Lambert-la-Potherie =

- Commune
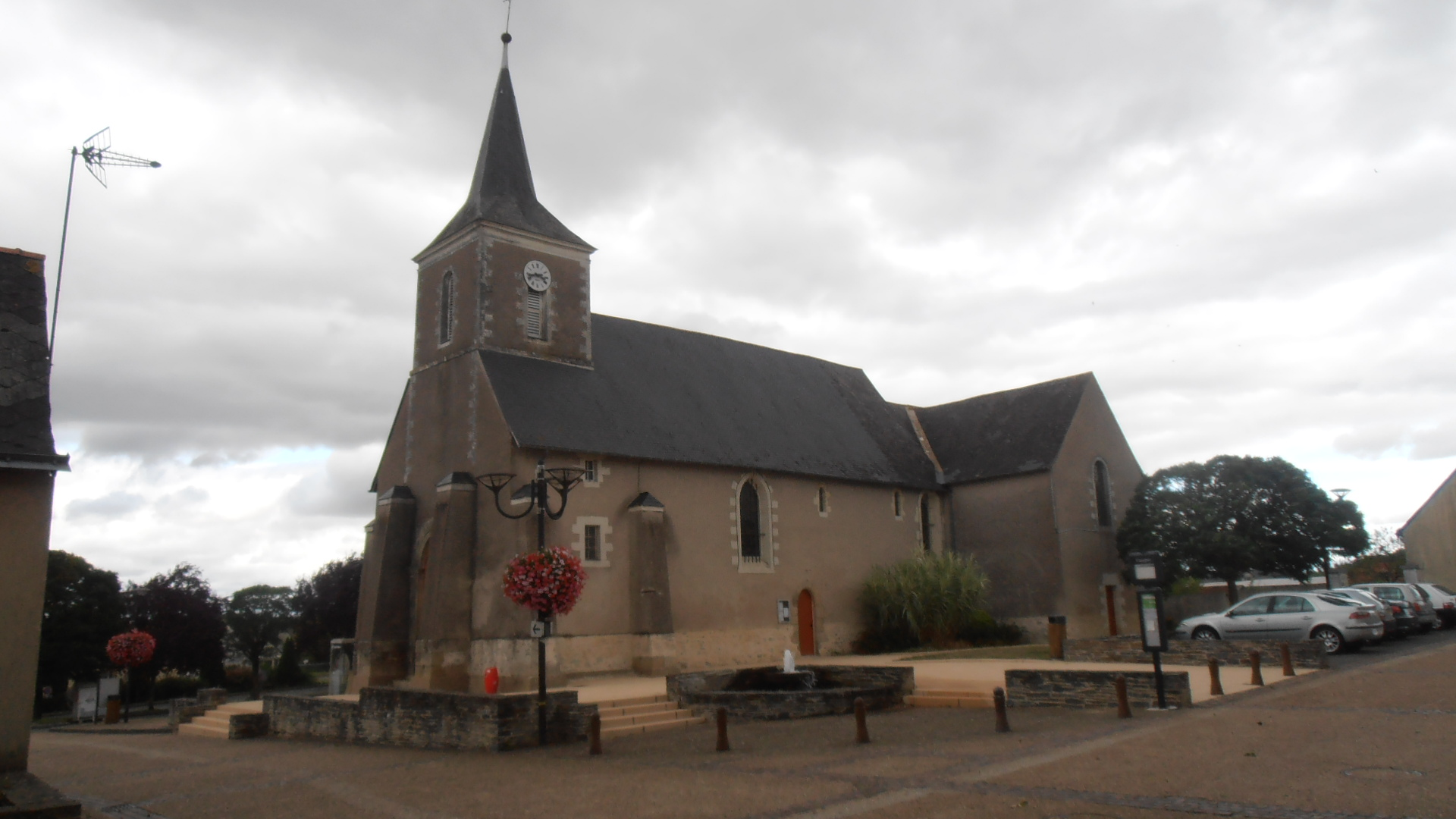
- The church of Saint-Lambert
- Location of Saint-Lambert-la-Potherie
- Location within France Location within Pays de la Loire
- Coordinates: 47°29′02″N 0°40′34″W
- Country: France
- Region: Pays de la Loire
- Department: Maine-et-Loire
- Arrondissement: Angers
- Canton: Angers-3
- Intercommunality: CU Angers Loire Métropole

Government
  - Mayor (2020–2026): Corinne Grosset
- Area^{1}: 13.81 km^{2} (5.33 sq mi)
- Elevation: 40 m (130 ft)
- Highest elevation: 76 m (249 ft)
- Lowest elevation: 39 m (128 ft)
- Population (2023): 2,974
  - Density: 215.4/km^{2} (557.8/sq mi)
- Time zone: UTC+01:00 (CET)
  - Summer (DST): UTC+02:00 (CEST)
- INSEE/Postal code: 49294 /49070
- ^{1} French Land Register data, which excludes lakes, ponds, glaciers > 1 km^{2} (0.386 sq mi or 247 acres) and river estuaries.

Saint-Lambert-la-Potherie (French pronunciation: [sɛ̃ lɑ̃bɛʁ la pɔtʁi]) is a commune in the Maine-et-Loire department in western France.

== Population ==
Historical population
Year	Pop.	±% p.a.
1968	421	—
1975	744	+8.47%
1982	1,688	+12.42%
1990	2,079	+2.64%
1999	2,209	+0.68%
2007	2,378	+0.93%
2012	2,541	+1.33%
2017	2,843	+2.27%
2023	2,974	+0.75%
Source: INSEE

== See also ==
- Communes of the Maine-et-Loire department
