= Beaucouzé =

- Commune
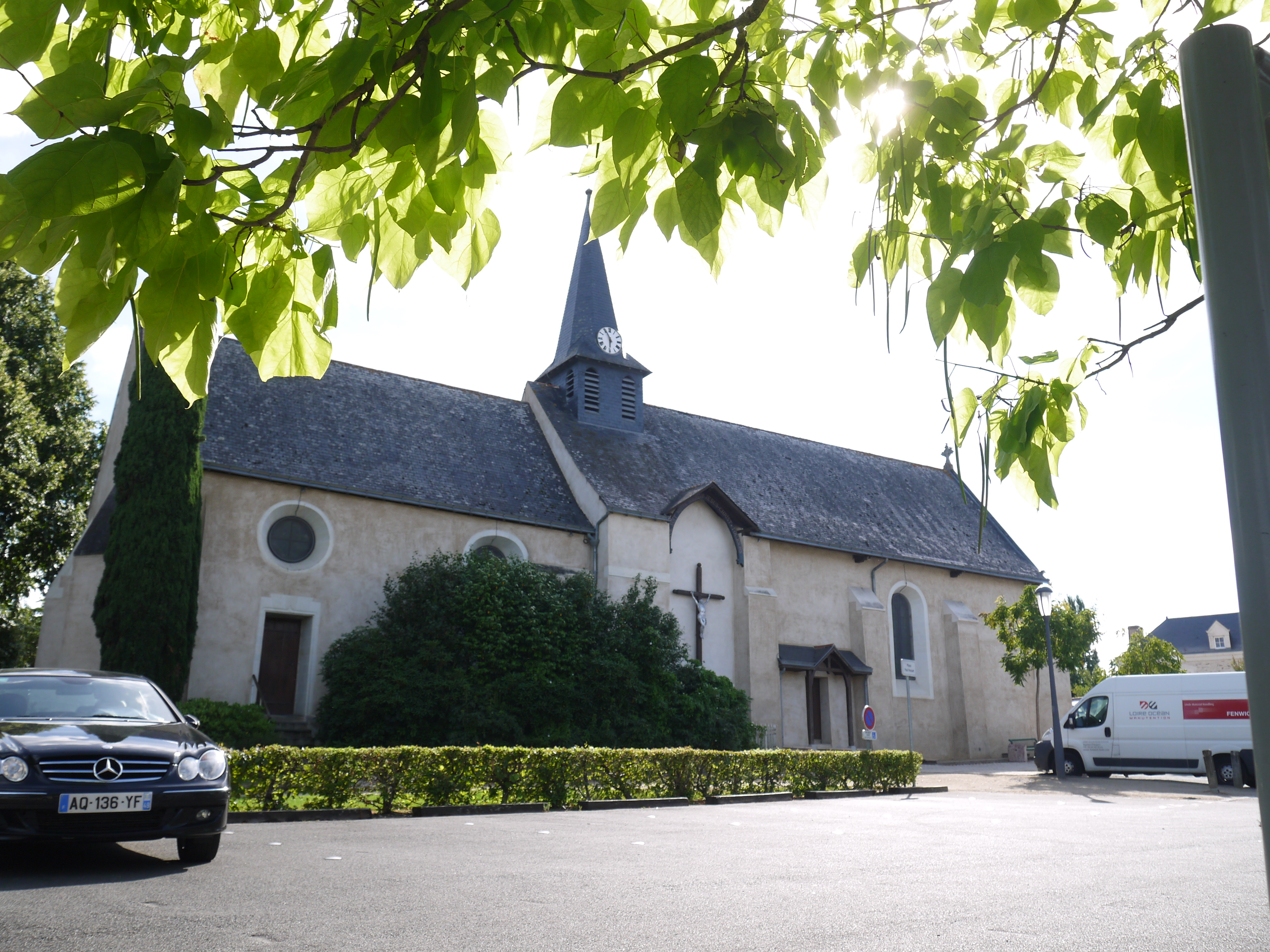
- The church in Beaucouzé

- Coat of arms
- Location of Beaucouzé
- Location within France Location within Pays de la Loire
- Coordinates: 47°28′34″N 0°37′54″W
- Country: France
- Region: Pays de la Loire
- Department: Maine-et-Loire
- Arrondissement: Angers
- Canton: Angers-3
- Intercommunality: CU Angers Loire Métropole

Government
  - Mayor (2020–2026): Yves Colliot
- Area^{1}: 19.34 km^{2} (7.47 sq mi)
- Elevation: 67 m (220 ft)
- Highest elevation: 88 m (289 ft)
- Lowest elevation: 21 m (69 ft)
- Population (2023): 5,732
  - Density: 296.4/km^{2} (767.6/sq mi)
- Time zone: UTC+01:00 (CET)
  - Summer (DST): UTC+02:00 (CEST)
- INSEE/Postal code: 49020 /49070
- ^{1} French Land Register data, which excludes lakes, ponds, glaciers > 1 km^{2} (0.386 sq mi or 247 acres) and river estuaries.

Beaucouzé (French pronunciation: [bokuze]) is a commune in the Maine-et-Loire department in western France.

== Population ==
Historical population

Year	Pop.	±% p.a.
1793	810	—
1800	409	−9.30%
1806	608	+6.83%
1821	677	+0.72%
1831	650	−0.41%
1836	696	+1.38%
1841	761	+1.80%
1846	820	+1.50%
1851	850	+0.72%
1856	796	−1.30%
1861	798	+0.05%
1866	764	−0.87%
1872	753	−0.24%
1876	737	−0.54%
1881	705	−0.88%
1886	719	+0.39%
1891	760	+1.12%
1896	714	−1.24%
1901	703	−0.31%

Year	Pop.	±% p.a.
1906	701	−0.06%
1911	691	−0.29%
1921	595	−1.48%
1926	631	+1.18%
1931	643	+0.38%
1936	636	−0.22%
1946	675	+0.60%
1954	679	+0.07%
1962	656	−0.43%
1968	821	+3.81%
1975	1,395	+7.87%
1982	2,266	+7.18%
1990	3,867	+6.91%
1999	4,851	+2.55%
2007	4,827	−0.06%
2012	4,889	+0.26%
2017	5,156	+1.07%
2023	5,732	+1.78%

Source: EHESS and INSEE (1968-2023)

== Climate ==
Climate data for Beaucouzé (1991–2020 averages)
Month	Jan	Feb	Mar	Apr	May	Jun	Jul	Aug	Sep	Oct	Nov	Dec	Year
Record high °C (°F)	17.1 (62.8)	21.2 (70.2)	24.8 (76.6)	29.7 (85.5)	32.8 (91.0)	40.1 (104.2)	40.7 (105.3)	38.7 (101.7)	35.7 (96.3)	30.5 (86.9)	22.2 (72.0)	19.0 (66.2)	40.7 (105.3)
Mean daily maximum °C (°F)	8.8 (47.8)	9.9 (49.8)	13.3 (55.9)	16.4 (61.5)	19.9 (67.8)	23.5 (74.3)	25.8 (78.4)	25.9 (78.6)	22.4 (72.3)	17.4 (63.3)	12.3 (54.1)	9.2 (48.6)	17.1 (62.8)
Daily mean °C (°F)	6.0 (42.8)	6.4 (43.5)	9.0 (48.2)	11.3 (52.3)	14.7 (58.5)	18.1 (64.6)	20.0 (68.0)	20.1 (68.2)	16.9 (62.4)	13.4 (56.1)	9.1 (48.4)	6.3 (43.3)	12.6 (54.7)
Mean daily minimum °C (°F)	3.3 (37.9)	2.9 (37.2)	4.6 (40.3)	6.3 (43.3)	9.6 (49.3)	12.6 (54.7)	14.3 (57.7)	14.3 (57.7)	11.4 (52.5)	9.3 (48.7)	5.9 (42.6)	3.5 (38.3)	8.2 (46.8)
Record low °C (°F)	−15.4 (4.3)	−12.8 (9.0)	−10.6 (12.9)	−3.4 (25.9)	−1.6 (29.1)	2.3 (36.1)	4.5 (40.1)	5.1 (41.2)	2.5 (36.5)	−3.2 (26.2)	−8.0 (17.6)	−13.4 (7.9)	−15.4 (4.3)
Average precipitation mm (inches)	69.9 (2.75)	54.4 (2.14)	52.8 (2.08)	54.7 (2.15)	59.4 (2.34)	48.7 (1.92)	45.0 (1.77)	48.2 (1.90)	56.5 (2.22)	71.9 (2.83)	72.9 (2.87)	74.9 (2.95)	709.3 (27.93)
Average precipitation days (≥ 1.0 mm)	11.4	9.5	9.4	9.7	9.2	6.8	6.1	7.1	7.6	10.6	11.9	11.7	110.9
Mean monthly sunshine hours	68.4	97.7	142.3	179.6	205.0	224.2	235.3	225.3	191.7	120.9	84.1	70.8	1,845.1
Source: Meteociel

== See also ==
- Communes of the Maine-et-Loire department
