= Sainte-Gemmes-sur-Loire =

- Commune
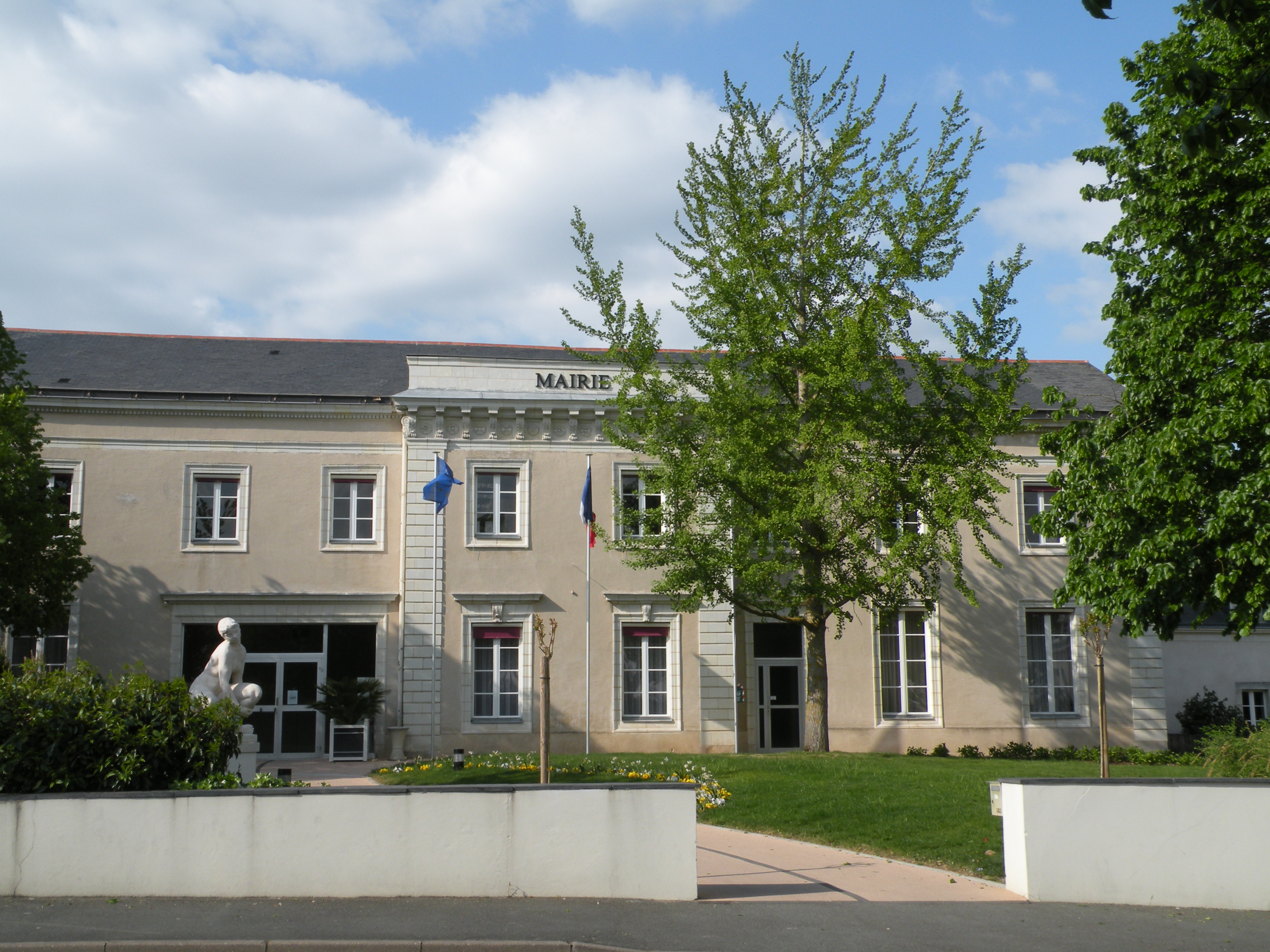
- The town hall of Sainte-Gemmes-sur-Loire
- Location of Sainte-Gemmes-sur-Loire
- Location within France Location within Pays de la Loire
- Coordinates: 47°25′34″N 0°33′22″W
- Country: France
- Region: Pays de la Loire
- Department: Maine-et-Loire
- Arrondissement: Angers
- Canton: Angers-2
- Intercommunality: CU Angers Loire Métropole

Government
  - Mayor (2020–2026): Paul Heulin
- Area^{1}: 14.83 km^{2} (5.73 sq mi)
- Elevation: 21 m (69 ft)
- Highest elevation: 45 m (148 ft)
- Lowest elevation: 12 m (39 ft)
- Population (2023): 3,685
  - Density: 248.5/km^{2} (643.6/sq mi)
- Time zone: UTC+01:00 (CET)
  - Summer (DST): UTC+02:00 (CEST)
- INSEE/Postal code: 49278 /49130
- ^{1} French Land Register data, which excludes lakes, ponds, glaciers > 1 km^{2} (0.386 sq mi or 247 acres) and river estuaries.

Sainte-Gemmes-sur-Loire (French pronunciation: [sɛ̃t ʒam syʁ lwaʁ], literally Saint-Gemmes on Loire) is a commune in the Maine-et-Loire department in western France.

== Population ==
Historical population
Year	Pop.	±% p.a.
1968	4,789	—
1975	4,466	−0.99%
1982	4,345	−0.39%
1990	3,803	−1.65%
1999	3,681	−0.36%
2007	3,922	+0.80%
2012	3,648	−1.44%
2017	3,406	−1.36%
2023	3,685	+1.32%
Source: INSEE

== See also ==
- Communes of the Maine-et-Loire department
