= Canton of Angers-Nord-Ouest =

Coordinates: 47°29′27″N 0°34′16″W

Angers-Nord-Ouest
- Former canton
- Interactive map of Angers-Nord-Ouest
- Country: France
- Region: Pays de la Loire
- Department: Maine-et-Loire
- No. of communes: {{{nbcomm}}}
- Disbanded: 2015
- Population (2012): 20,934

The Canton of Angers-Nord-Ouest is a French former administrative division, located in the arrondissement of Angers, in the Maine-et-Loire département (Pays de la Loire région). It had 20,934 inhabitants (2012). It was disbanded following the French canton reorganisation which came into effect in March 2015.

== Composition ==
The canton of Angers-Nord-Ouest comprised the following communes:

- Angers (partly)
- Avrillé

== See also ==
- Cantons of the Maine-et-Loire department
- Communes of the Maine-et-Loire department
