= Jardin botanique de Briollay =

Botanical garden in Pays de la Loire, France

Coordinates: 47°33′54″N 0°30′26″W

The Jardin botanique de Briollay is a botanical garden located on the Chemin de la Guichardière, Briollay, Maine-et-Loire, Pays de la Loire, France. It contains more than 70 types of shrubs and berry bushes, set on a hillside with excellent views of the valleys below.

== See also ==
- List of botanical gardens in France
