= Briollay =

- Commune
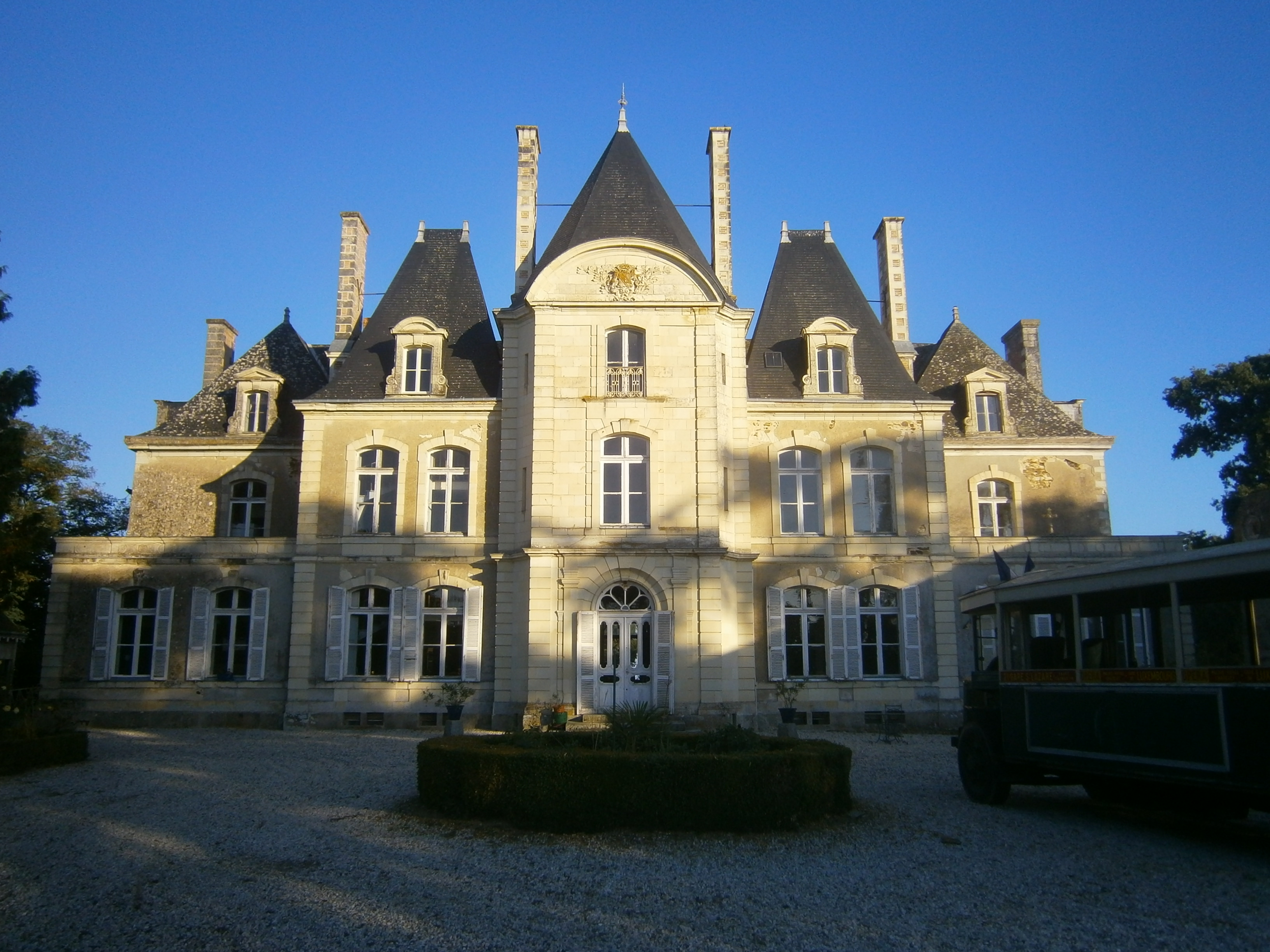
- The Chateau de Norieux
- Location of Briollay
- Location within France Location within Pays de la Loire
- Coordinates: 47°33′54″N 0°30′26″W
- Country: France
- Region: Pays de la Loire
- Department: Maine-et-Loire
- Arrondissement: Angers
- Canton: Angers-5
- Intercommunality: CU Angers Loire Métropole

Government
  - Mayor (2020–2026): Arnaud Hie
- Area^{1}: 15.06 km^{2} (5.81 sq mi)
- Highest elevation: 64 m (210 ft)
- Lowest elevation: 13 m (43 ft)
- Population (2023): 3,225
  - Density: 214.1/km^{2} (554.6/sq mi)
- Time zone: UTC+01:00 (CET)
  - Summer (DST): UTC+02:00 (CEST)
- INSEE/Postal code: 49048 /49125
- ^{1} French Land Register data, which excludes lakes, ponds, glaciers > 1 km^{2} (0.386 sq mi or 247 acres) and river estuaries.

Briollay (French pronunciation: [bʁijɔlɛ]) is a commune in the Maine-et-Loire department in western France.

== Population ==
Historical population

Year	Pop.	±% p.a.
1793	975	—
1821	948	−0.10%
1846	1,009	+0.25%
1872	946	−0.25%
1901	731	−0.89%
1926	571	−0.98%
1946	610	+0.33%
1962	661	+0.50%
1968	776	+2.71%

Year	Pop.	±% p.a.
1975	1,164	+5.96%
1982	1,683	+5.41%
1990	2,005	+2.21%
1999	2,282	+1.45%
2007	2,565	+1.47%
2012	2,751	+1.41%
2017	2,967	+1.52%
2023	3,225	+1.40%

Source: EHESS and INSEE (1968-2023)

== Sights ==
- Jardin botanique de Briollay

== See also ==
- Communes of the Maine-et-Loire department
