= Béhuard =

- Commune
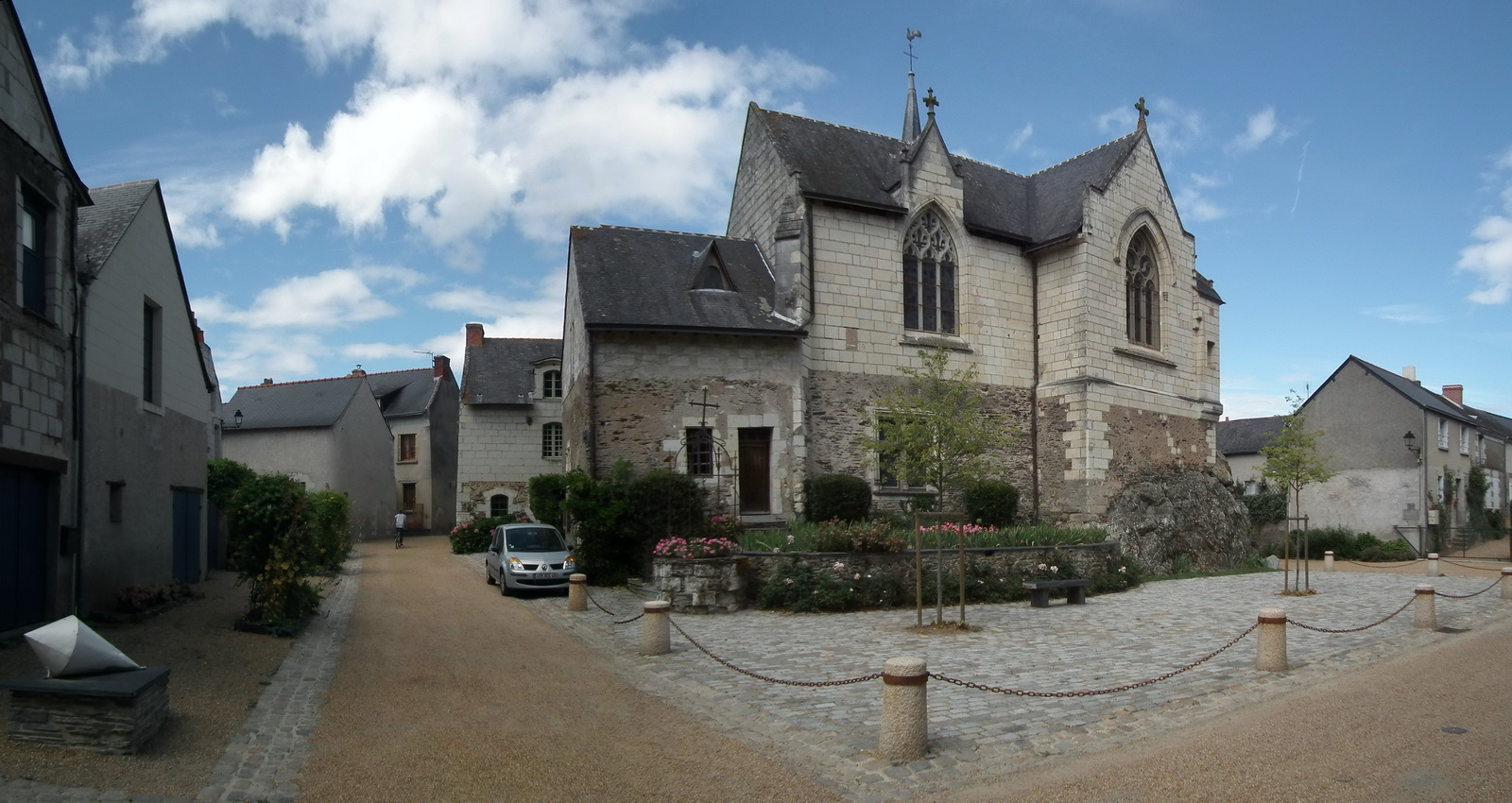
- The church in Béhuard

- Coat of arms
- Location of Béhuard
- Location within France Location within Pays de la Loire
- Coordinates: 47°22′48″N 0°38′34″W
- Country: France
- Region: Pays de la Loire
- Department: Maine-et-Loire
- Arrondissement: Angers
- Canton: Angers-3
- Intercommunality: CU Angers Loire Métropole

Government
  - Mayor (2020–2026): Bruno Richou
- Area^{1}: 2.21 km^{2} (0.85 sq mi)
- Elevation: 17 m (56 ft)
- Highest elevation: 16 m (52 ft)
- Lowest elevation: 12 m (39 ft)
- Population (2023): 115
  - Density: 52.0/km^{2} (135/sq mi)
- Time zone: UTC+01:00 (CET)
  - Summer (DST): UTC+02:00 (CEST)
- INSEE/Postal code: 49028 /49170
- ^{1} French Land Register data, which excludes lakes, ponds, glaciers > 1 km^{2} (0.386 sq mi or 247 acres) and river estuaries.

Béhuard (French pronunciation: [be'ɥaʁ]) is a commune and island in a contiguous river in the Maine-et-Loire department in western France.

== Population ==
Historical population
Year	Pop.	±% p.a.
1968	85	—
1975	100	+2.35%
1982	93	−1.03%
1990	94	+0.13%
1999	110	+1.76%
2007	130	+2.11%
2012	124	−0.94%
2017	125	+0.16%
2023	115	−1.38%
Source: INSEE

== See also ==
- Communes of the Maine-et-Loire department
