= Cantenay-Épinard =

- Commune
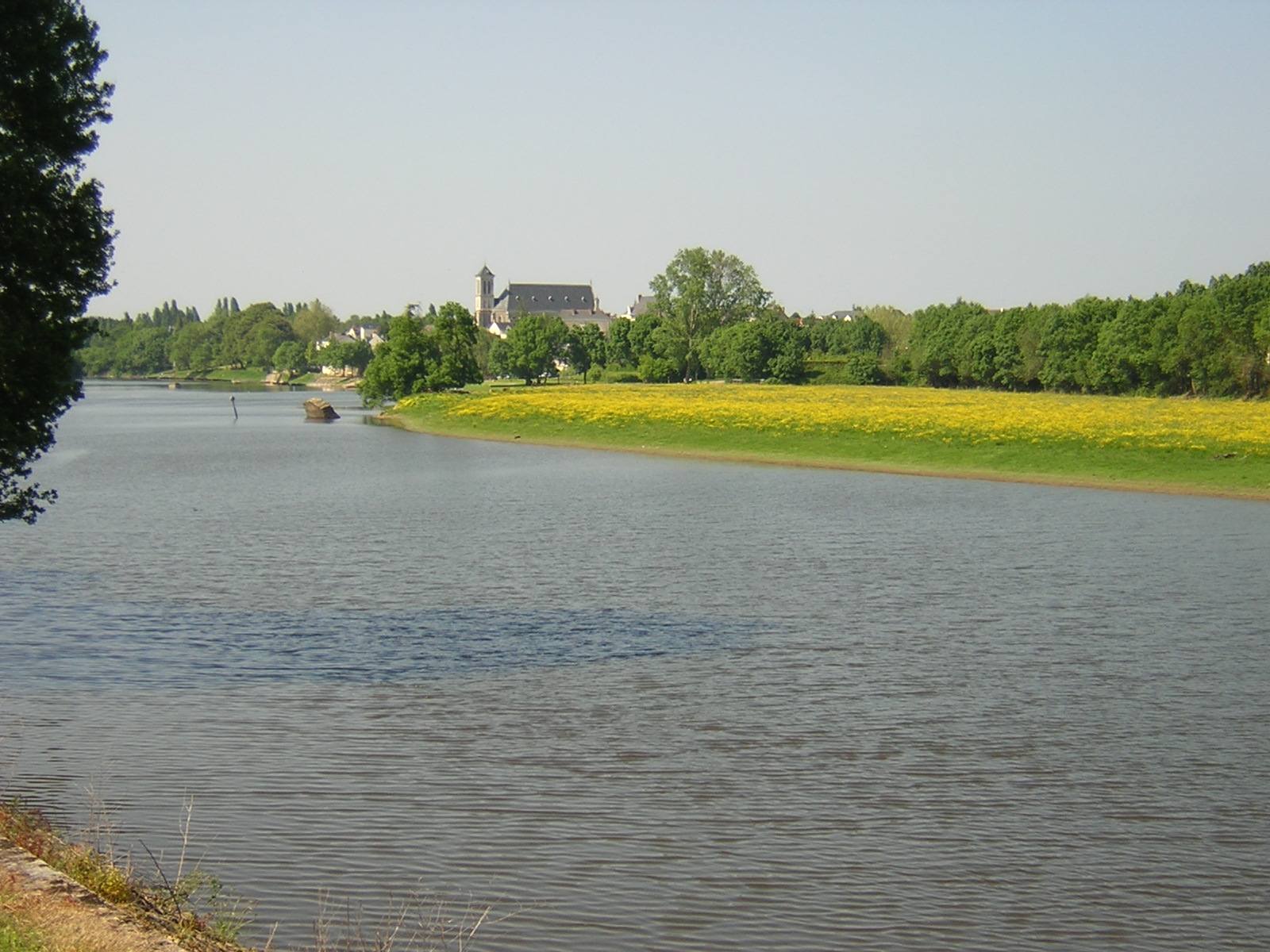
- A general view of Cantenay-Épinard, by the Mayenne
- Location of Cantenay-Épinard
- Location within France Location within Pays de la Loire
- Coordinates: 47°32′03″N 0°34′02″W
- Country: France
- Region: Pays de la Loire
- Department: Maine-et-Loire
- Arrondissement: Angers
- Canton: Angers-5
- Intercommunality: CU Angers Loire Métropole

Government
  - Mayor (2020–2026): Marc Cailleau
- Area^{1}: 16.1 km^{2} (6.2 sq mi)
- Elevation: 55 m (180 ft)
- Highest elevation: 49 m (161 ft)
- Lowest elevation: 12 m (39 ft)
- Population (2023): 2,415
  - Density: 150/km^{2} (388/sq mi)
- Demonym(s): Cantenaysien, Cantenaysienne
- Time zone: UTC+01:00 (CET)
  - Summer (DST): UTC+02:00 (CEST)
- INSEE/Postal code: 49055 /49460
- ^{1} French Land Register data, which excludes lakes, ponds, glaciers > 1 km^{2} (0.386 sq mi or 247 acres) and river estuaries.

Cantenay-Épinard (French pronunciation: [kɑ̃tnɛ epinaʁ]) is a commune in the Maine-et-Loire department in western France.

== Population ==
Historical population
Year	Pop.	±% p.a.
1968	813	—
1975	1,177	+5.43%
1982	1,374	+2.24%
1990	1,632	+2.17%
1999	1,865	+1.49%
2007	1,975	+0.72%
2012	2,047	+0.72%
2017	2,303	+2.38%
2023	2,415	+0.79%
Source: INSEE

== See also ==
- Communes of the Maine-et-Loire department
