= Saint-Clément-de-la-Place =

- Commune
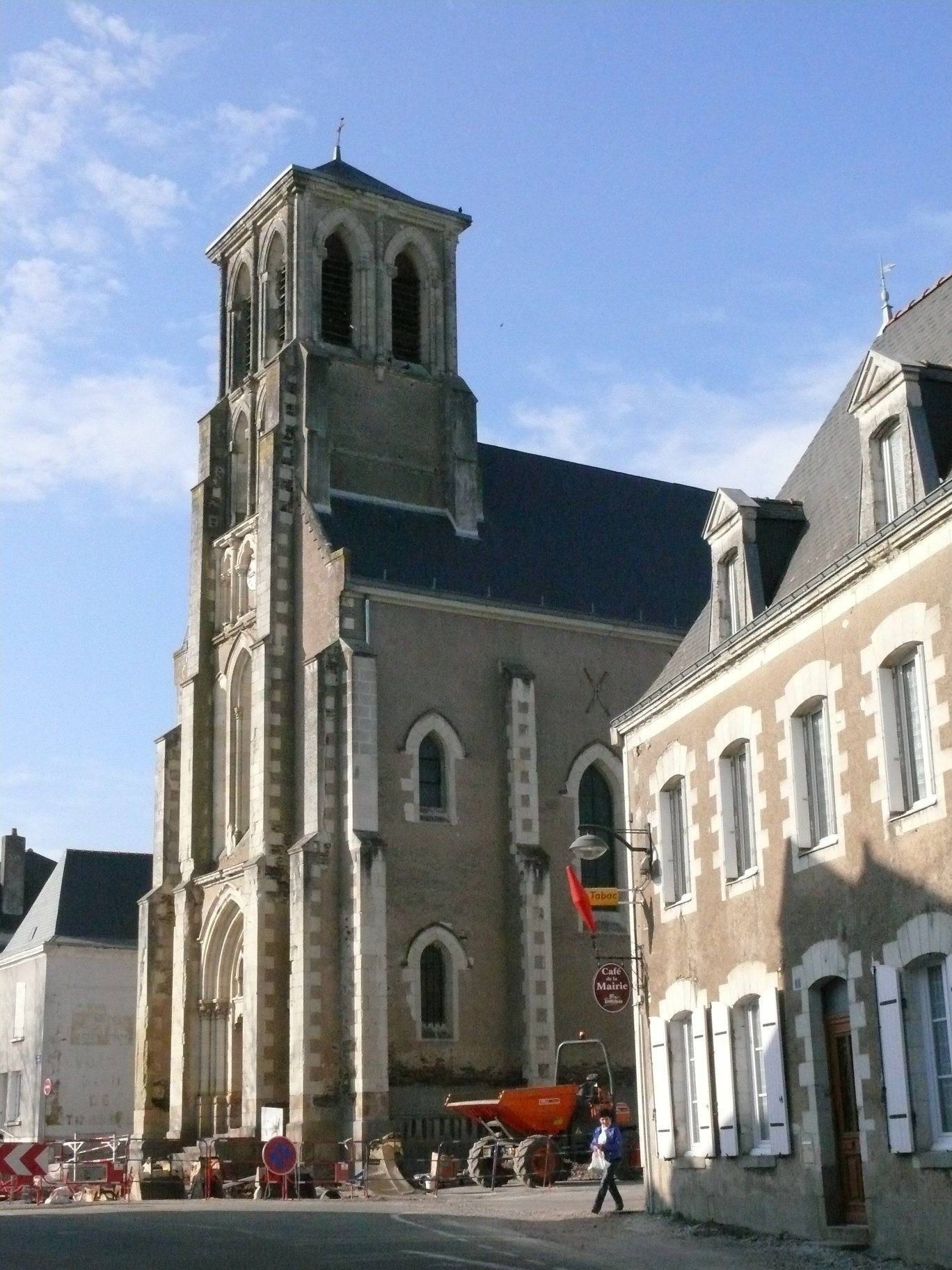
- The church of Saint-Clément
- Location of Saint-Clément-de-la-Place
- Location within France Location within Pays de la Loire
- Coordinates: 47°31′30″N 0°44′42″W
- Country: France
- Region: Pays de la Loire
- Department: Maine-et-Loire
- Arrondissement: Angers
- Canton: Angers-3
- Intercommunality: CU Angers Loire Métropole

Government
  - Mayor (2020–2026): Philippe Veyer
- Area^{1}: 33.23 km^{2} (12.83 sq mi)
- Elevation: 24 m (79 ft)
- Highest elevation: 102 m (335 ft)
- Lowest elevation: 40 m (130 ft)
- Population (2023): 2,168
  - Density: 65.24/km^{2} (169.0/sq mi)
- Time zone: UTC+01:00 (CET)
  - Summer (DST): UTC+02:00 (CEST)
- INSEE/Postal code: 49271 /49370
- ^{1} French Land Register data, which excludes lakes, ponds, glaciers > 1 km^{2} (0.386 sq mi or 247 acres) and river estuaries.

Saint-Clément-de-la-Place (French pronunciation: [sɛ̃ klemɑ̃ də la plas]) is a commune in the Maine-et-Loire department in western France.

== Population ==
Historical population
Year	Pop.	±% p.a.
1968	904	—
1975	901	−0.05%
1982	1,200	+4.18%
1990	1,320	+1.20%
1999	1,392	+0.59%
2007	1,777	+3.10%
2012	2,049	+2.89%
2017	2,131	+0.79%
2023	2,168	+0.29%
Source: INSEE

== See also ==
- Communes of the Maine-et-Loire department
