= Miré =

- Commune
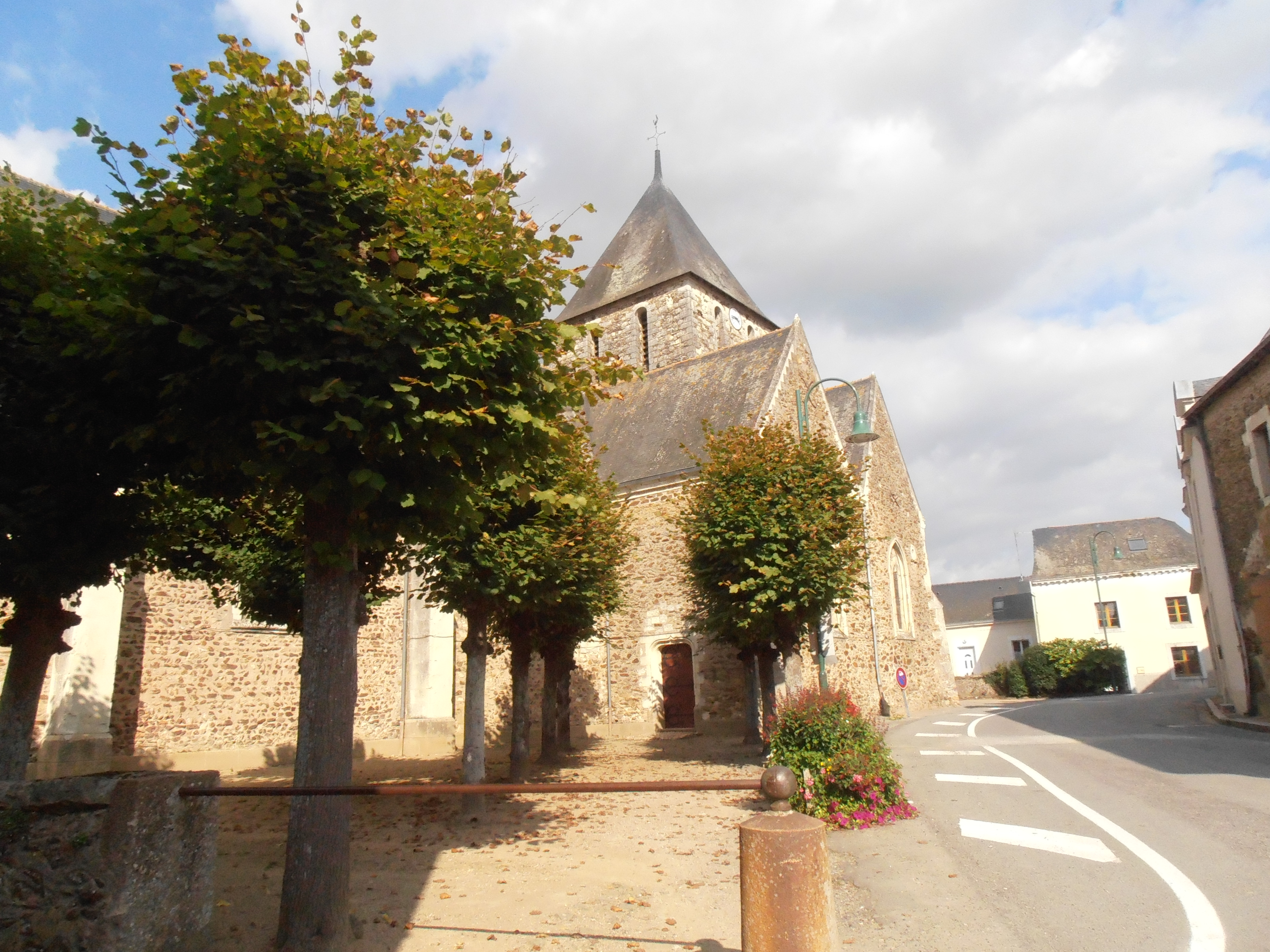
- The centre of Miré
- Location of Miré
- Location within France Location within Pays de la Loire
- Coordinates: 47°45′32″N 0°29′28″W
- Country: France
- Region: Pays de la Loire
- Department: Maine-et-Loire
- Arrondissement: Segré
- Canton: Tiercé
- Intercommunality: Vallées du Haut-Anjou

Government
  - Mayor (2020–2026): Brigitte Olignon-Guirriec
- Area^{1}: 17.73 km^{2} (6.85 sq mi)
- Elevation: 50 m (160 ft)
- Highest elevation: 81 m (266 ft)
- Lowest elevation: 24 m (79 ft)
- Population (2023): 1,060
  - Density: 59.8/km^{2} (155/sq mi)
- Demonym(s): Miréen, Miréenne
- Time zone: UTC+01:00 (CET)
  - Summer (DST): UTC+02:00 (CEST)
- INSEE/Postal code: 49205 /49330
- ^{1} French Land Register data, which excludes lakes, ponds, glaciers > 1 km^{2} (0.386 sq mi or 247 acres) and river estuaries.

Miré (French pronunciation: [miʁe]) is a commune in the Maine-et-Loire department in western France.

== See also ==
- Communes of the Maine-et-Loire department
