= La Jaille-Yvon =

- Commune
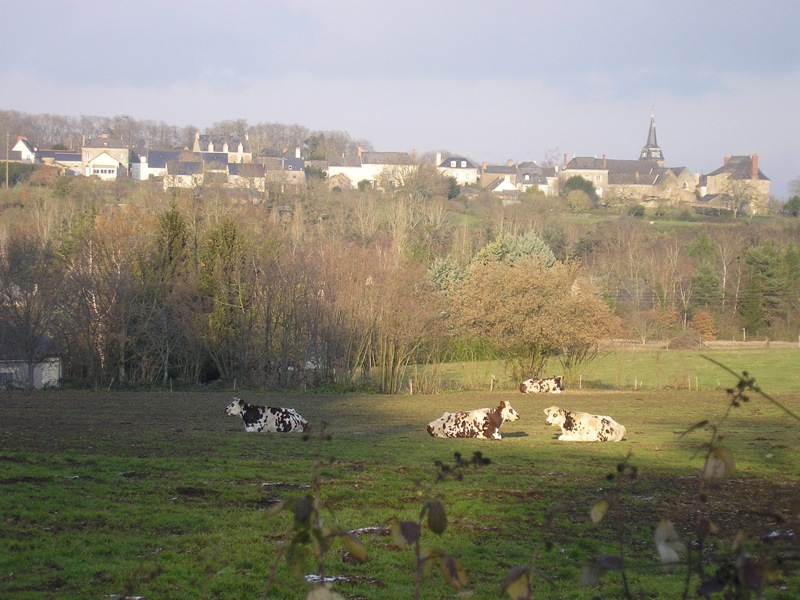
- A general view of La Jaille-Yvon

- Coat of arms
- Location of La Jaille-Yvon
- Location within France Location within Pays de la Loire
- Coordinates: 47°43′24″N 0°40′10″W
- Country: France
- Region: Pays de la Loire
- Department: Maine-et-Loire
- Arrondissement: Segré
- Canton: Tiercé
- Intercommunality: Vallées du Haut-Anjou

Government
  - Mayor (2020–2026): Pascal Chevrollier
- Area^{1}: 12.55 km^{2} (4.85 sq mi)
- Elevation: 80 m (260 ft)
- Highest elevation: 87 m (285 ft)
- Lowest elevation: 20 m (66 ft)
- Population (2023): 343
  - Density: 27.3/km^{2} (70.8/sq mi)
- Demonym(s): Jaonnais, Jaonnaise
- Time zone: UTC+01:00 (CET)
  - Summer (DST): UTC+02:00 (CEST)
- INSEE/Postal code: 49161 /49220
- ^{1} French Land Register data, which excludes lakes, ponds, glaciers > 1 km^{2} (0.386 sq mi or 247 acres) and river estuaries.

La Jaille-Yvon (French pronunciation: [la ʒaj ivɔ̃]) is a commune in the Maine-et-Loire department in western France.

== See also ==
- Communes of the Maine-et-Loire department
