= Saint-Martin-du-Fouilloux, Maine-et-Loire =

Saint-Martin-du-Fouilloux
- Commune
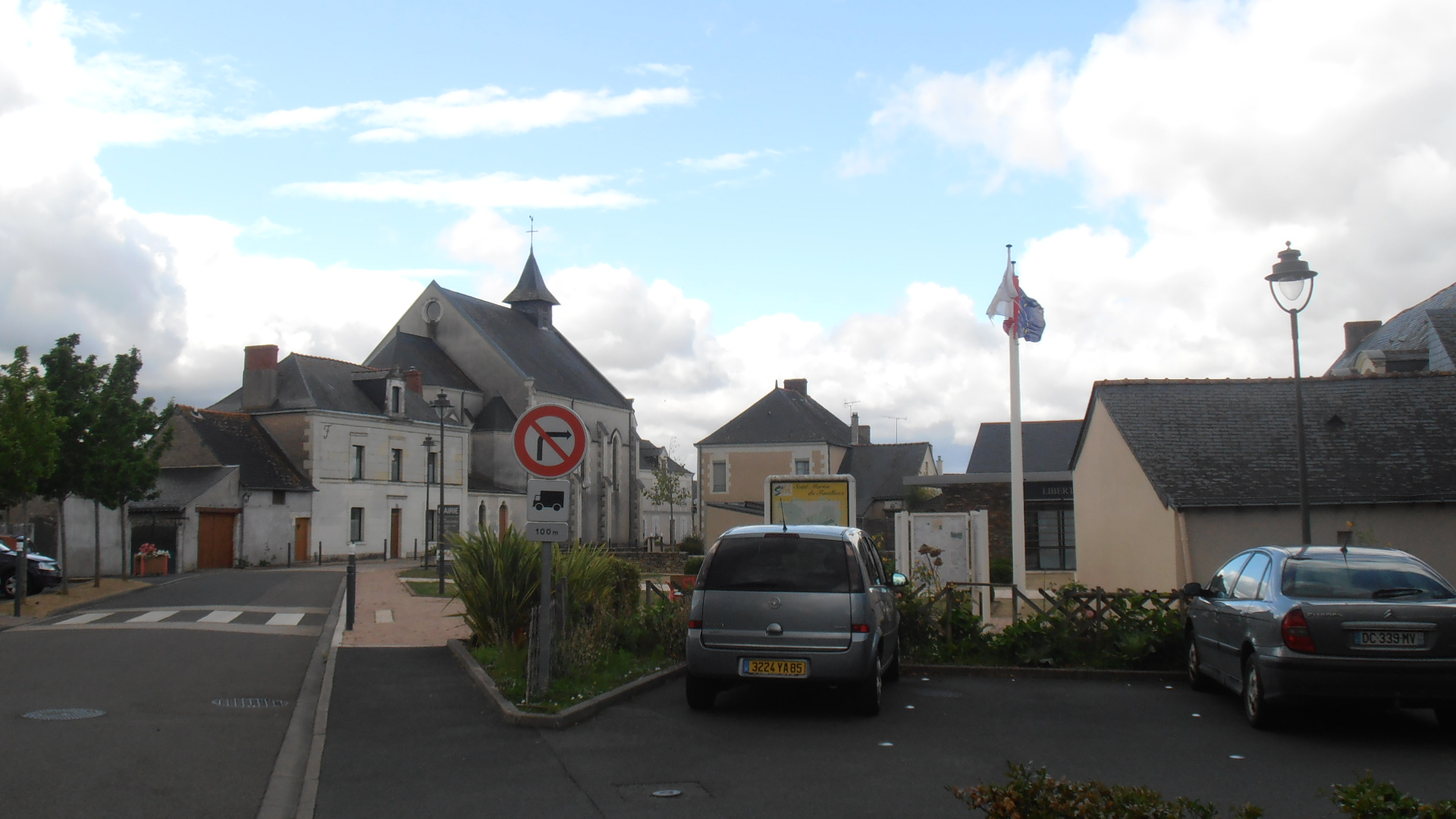
- The centre of the village
- Location of Saint-Martin-du-Fouilloux
- Location within France Location within Pays de la Loire
- Coordinates: 47°25′55″N 0°42′12″W
- Country: France
- Region: Pays de la Loire
- Department: Maine-et-Loire
- Arrondissement: Angers
- Canton: Angers-3
- Intercommunality: CU Angers Loire Métropole

Government
  - Mayor (2024–2026): Monique Leroy
- Area^{1}: 14.82 km^{2} (5.72 sq mi)
- Elevation: 55 m (180 ft)
- Highest elevation: 81 m (266 ft)
- Lowest elevation: 28 m (92 ft)
- Population (2023): 1,705
  - Density: 115.0/km^{2} (298.0/sq mi)
- Time zone: UTC+01:00 (CET)
  - Summer (DST): UTC+02:00 (CEST)
- INSEE/Postal code: 49306 /49170
- ^{1} French Land Register data, which excludes lakes, ponds, glaciers > 1 km^{2} (0.386 sq mi or 247 acres) and river estuaries.

Saint-Martin-du-Fouilloux (French pronunciation: [sɛ̃ maʁtɛ̃ dy fuju]) is a commune in the Maine-et-Loire department in western France.

== See also ==
- Communes of the Maine-et-Loire department
