= Thorigné-d'Anjou =

- Commune
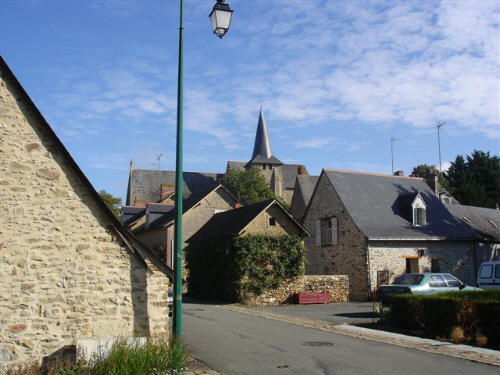
- The church of Saint Martin in Thorigné-d'Anjou
- Location of Thorigné-d'Anjou
- Location within France Location within Pays de la Loire
- Coordinates: 47°38′23″N 0°39′43″W
- Country: France
- Region: Pays de la Loire
- Department: Maine-et-Loire
- Arrondissement: Segré
- Canton: Tiercé

Government
  - Mayor (2022–2026): Christelle Lahaye
- Area^{1}: 16.45 km^{2} (6.35 sq mi)
- Elevation: 52 m (171 ft)
- Highest elevation: 66 m (217 ft)
- Lowest elevation: 17 m (56 ft)
- Population (2023): 1,223
  - Density: 74.35/km^{2} (192.6/sq mi)
- Demonym(s): Thorignéen, Thorignéenne
- Time zone: UTC+01:00 (CET)
  - Summer (DST): UTC+02:00 (CEST)
- INSEE/Postal code: 49344 /49220
- ^{1} French Land Register data, which excludes lakes, ponds, glaciers > 1 km^{2} (0.386 sq mi or 247 acres) and river estuaries.

Thorigné-d'Anjou (French pronunciation: [tɔʁiɲe dɑ̃ʒu], literally Thorigné of Anjou) is a commune in the Maine-et-Loire department in western France.

== See also ==
- Communes of the Maine-et-Loire department
