= Tiercé =

- Commune
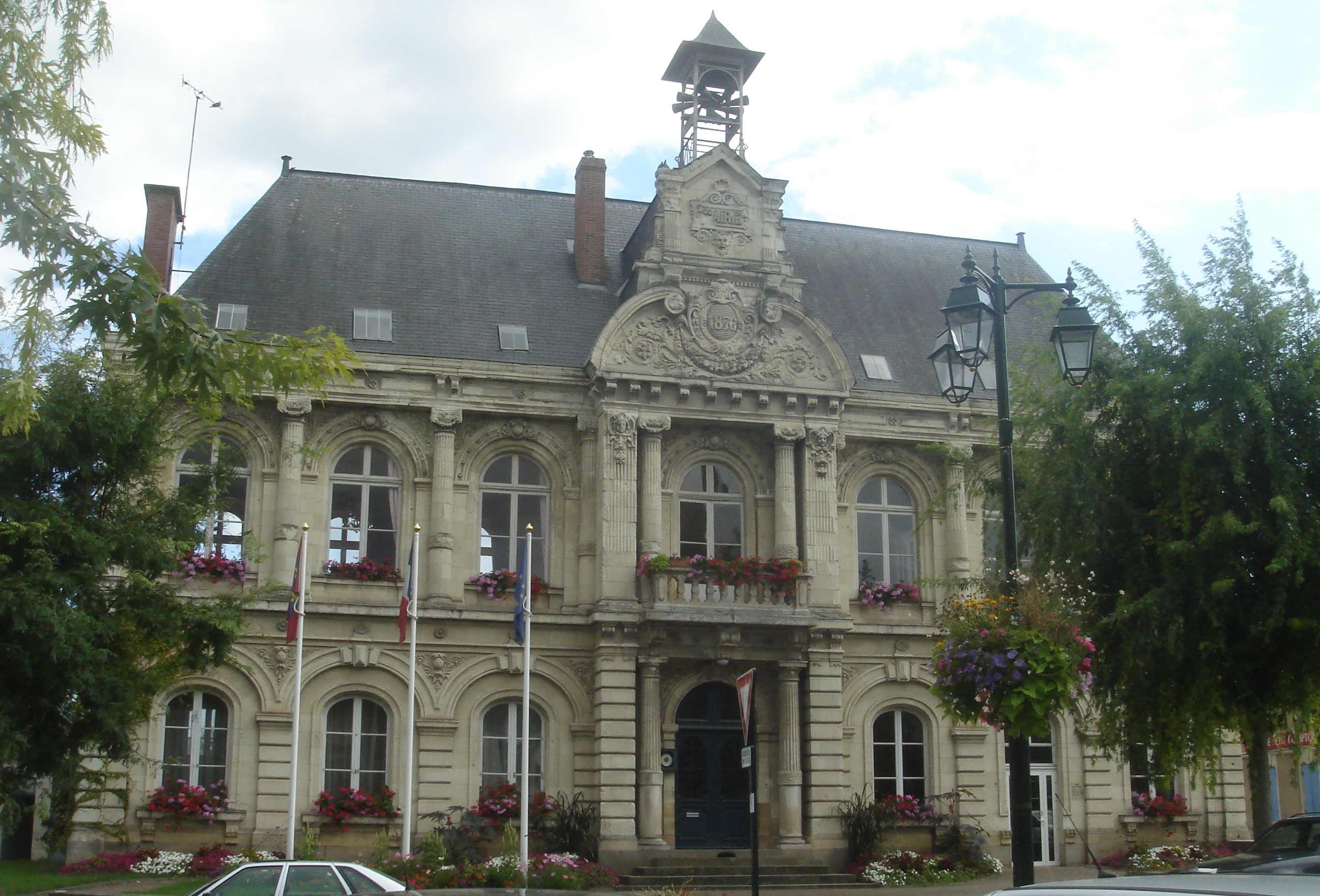
- The Town Hall
- Location of Tiercé
- Location within France Location within Pays de la Loire
- Coordinates: 47°36′56″N 0°27′58″W
- Country: France
- Region: Pays de la Loire
- Department: Maine-et-Loire
- Arrondissement: Angers
- Canton: Tiercé

Government
  - Mayor (2020–2026): Jean-Jacques Girard
- Area^{1}: 33.7 km^{2} (13.0 sq mi)
- Highest elevation: 73 m (240 ft)
- Lowest elevation: 13 m (43 ft)
- Population (2023): 4,589
  - Density: 136/km^{2} (353/sq mi)
- Demonym(s): Tiercéen, Tiercéenne
- Time zone: UTC+01:00 (CET)
  - Summer (DST): UTC+02:00 (CEST)
- INSEE/Postal code: 49347 /49125
- ^{1} French Land Register data, which excludes lakes, ponds, glaciers > 1 km^{2} (0.386 sq mi or 247 acres) and river estuaries.

Tiercé (French pronunciation: [tjɛʁse]) is a commune in the Maine-et-Loire department in western France.

== Population ==
Historical population
Year	Pop.	±% p.a.
1968	1,968	—
1975	2,025	+0.41%
1982	2,627	+3.79%
1990	3,047	+1.87%
1999	3,605	+1.89%
2007	4,070	+1.53%
2012	4,261	+0.92%
2017	4,381	+0.56%
2023	4,589	+0.78%
Source: INSEE

== See also ==
- Communes of the Maine-et-Loire department
