= Cheffes =

- Commune
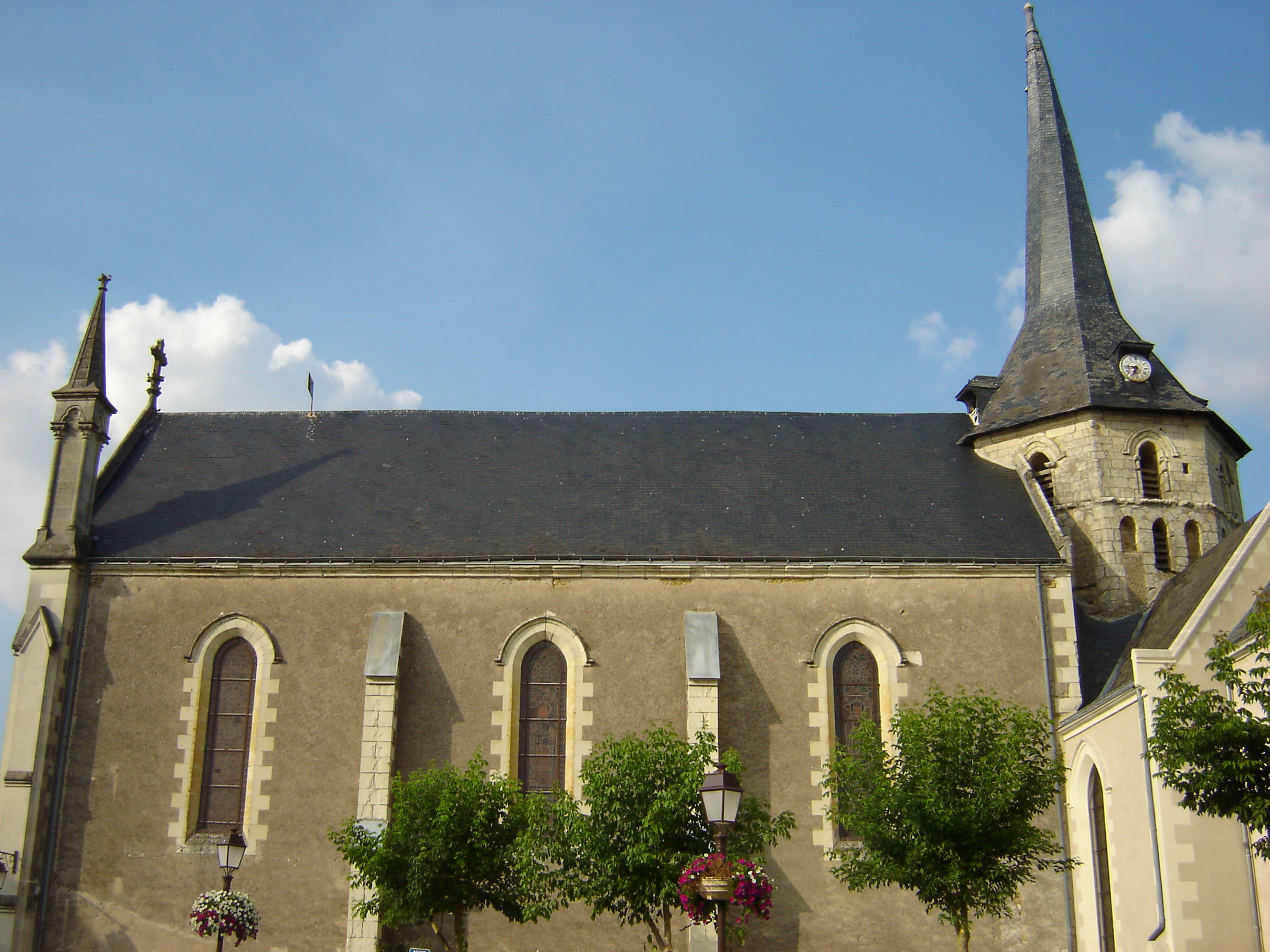
- The church in Cheffes
- Location of Cheffes
- Location within France Location within Pays de la Loire
- Coordinates: 47°37′18″N 0°30′23″W
- Country: France
- Region: Pays de la Loire
- Department: Maine-et-Loire
- Arrondissement: Angers
- Canton: Tiercé

Government
  - Mayor (2020–2026): Marc Dutruel
- Area^{1}: 17.35 km^{2} (6.70 sq mi)
- Elevation: 21 m (69 ft)
- Highest elevation: 53 m (174 ft)
- Lowest elevation: 14 m (46 ft)
- Population (2023): 1,044
  - Density: 60.17/km^{2} (155.8/sq mi)
- Demonym(s): Cheffois, Cheffoise
- Time zone: UTC+01:00 (CET)
  - Summer (DST): UTC+02:00 (CEST)
- INSEE/Postal code: 49090 /49125
- Website: cheffes.fr
- ^{1} French Land Register data, which excludes lakes, ponds, glaciers > 1 km^{2} (0.386 sq mi or 247 acres) and river estuaries.

Cheffes (French pronunciation: [ʃɛf]) is a commune in the Maine-et-Loire department of western France.

== See also ==
- Communes of the Maine-et-Loire department
