= Château du Plessis-Bourré =

Château in Pays de la Loire, France

Coordinates: 47°36′04″N 0°32′40″W

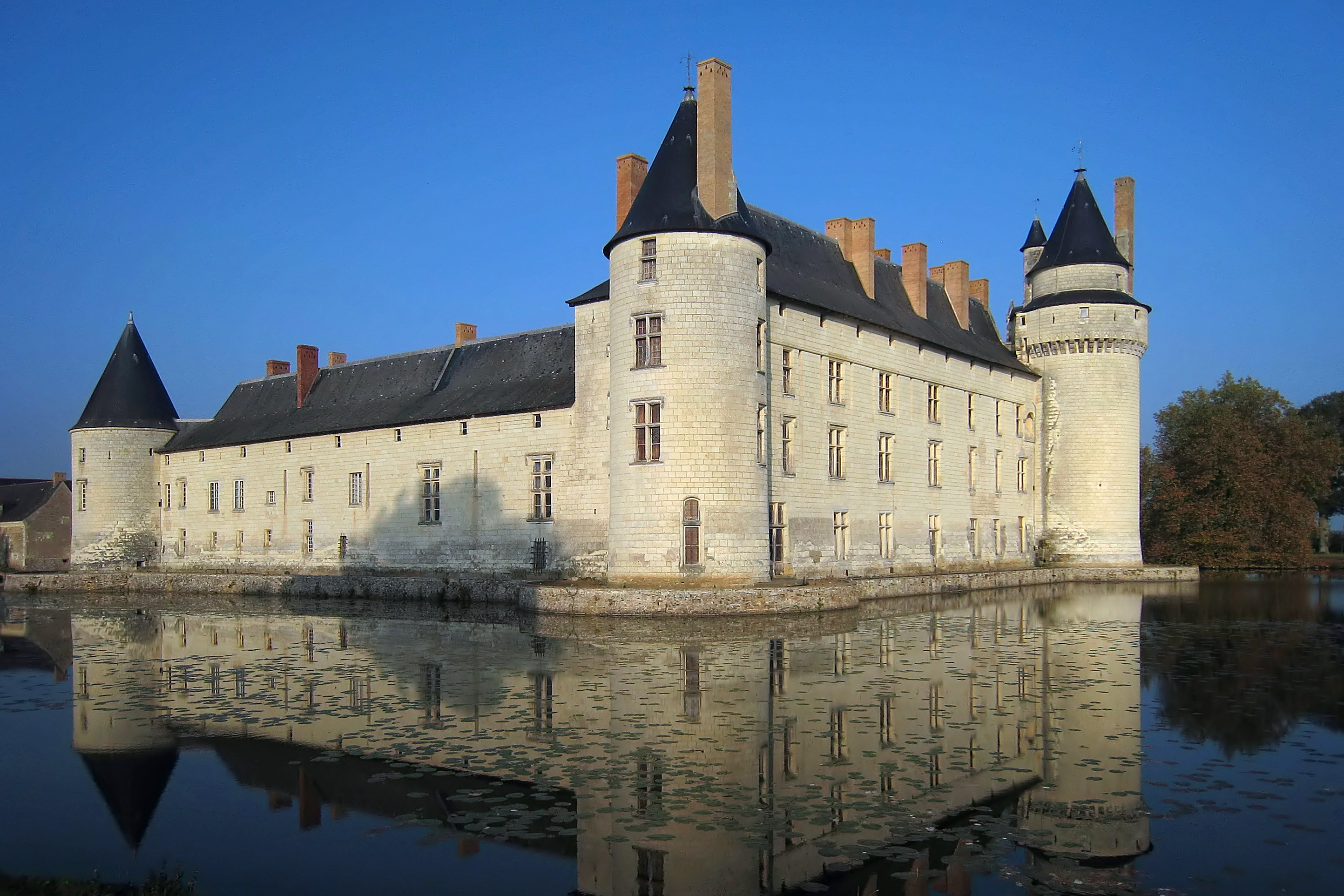
Chateau du Plessis-Bourré

Château du Plessis-Bourré is a château in the Loire Valley in France, situated in the commune of Écuillé in the Maine-et-Loire department. Built in less than 5 years from 1468 to 1472 by Finance Minister Jean Bourré, the principal advisor to King Louis XI. The château has not been modified externally since its construction and still has a fully working drawbridge. It was classified as a Monument historique in 1931.

Château du Plessis-Bourré was once owned by La Maison De Nuchèze. Jacques de Nuchèze the fourth child of Guillaume de Nuchèze IV Seigneur de Baudiment, des Francs, de Brain, de Chincé & de Batrisse died after 1486 and married Catherine des Francs whose parents were Louis des Francs, Seigneur des Francs & Bartholomée de Torve who died in 1505. Jacques de Nuchèze married Françoise d'Anlezy they had a child called Jean De Nuchèze, Seigneur du Plessis. Jean De Nuchèze, Seigneur du Plessis then proceeded to marry Catherine de Viry on 02.08.1579 and they had a child called Antoine du Plessis. see the De Nuchèze wiki for more info

The château was purchased in 1911 by Henry Vaïsse who, when he died in 1956, bequeathed it to his nephew, François Reille-Soult, Duke of Dalmatie, descendant of the marshals of the French empire Soult, Reille and Masséna.

In 1978, Antoinette de Ferrières de Sauvebœuf, born de Croix, granddaughter of the Duke of Dalmatie, and her spouse Bruno de Ferrières de Sauvebœuf took the responsibility of heading the renovation and maintenance of the château until 2009. They lived there with their three children, Victor (1976), Matthias (1978), and Jean-Baptiste (1980), for 31 years, the longest stay of a single family since 1473.

Since 2010, it has been inhabited by descendants of François Reille-Soult of Dalmatie and managed by Aymeric d'Anthenaise and Jean-François Reille-Soult de Dalmatie.

The Château du Plessis-Bourré has been the location for numerous films, including:

- Peau d'Âne (1970) by Jacques Demy
- Louis XI by J.C. Lubtchansky
- Jeanne d'Arc (1989 telefilm) by Pierre Badel
- Le Bossu (1997) by Philippe de Broca
- Fanfan la Tulipe (2003) by Gérard Krawczyk
- La Reine et le Cardinal (telefilm)
- The Princess of Montpensier (2009) by Bertrand Tavernier
- Louis XI, Le Pouvoir Fracassé (2010) by Henri Helman with Jacques Perrin
