= Écuillé =

- Commune
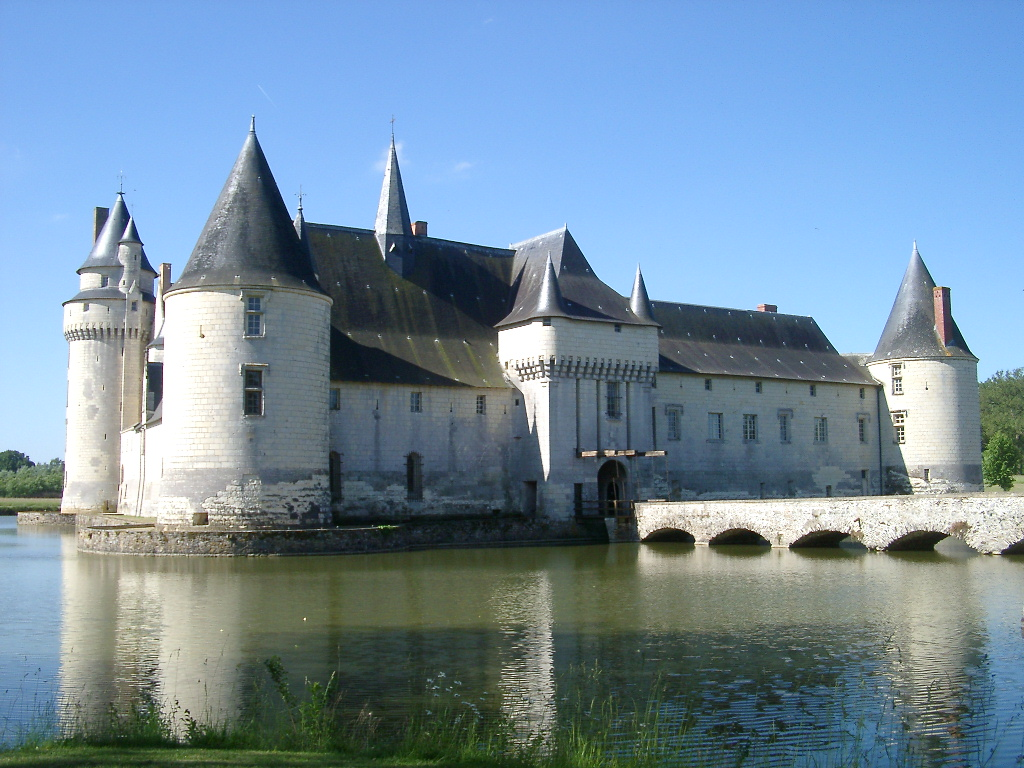
- The Château du Plessis-Bourré
- Location of Écuillé
- Location within France Location within Pays de la Loire
- Coordinates: 47°36′58″N 0°33′41″W
- Country: France
- Region: Pays de la Loire
- Department: Maine-et-Loire
- Arrondissement: Angers
- Canton: Angers-5
- Intercommunality: CU Angers Loire Métropole

Government
  - Mayor (2020–2026): Jean-Louis Demois
- Area^{1}: 12.55 km^{2} (4.85 sq mi)
- Highest elevation: 68 m (223 ft)
- Lowest elevation: 18 m (59 ft)
- Population (2023): 655
  - Density: 52.2/km^{2} (135/sq mi)
- Demonym: Ecuilléen
- Time zone: UTC+01:00 (CET)
  - Summer (DST): UTC+02:00 (CEST)
- INSEE/Postal code: 49130 /49460
- ^{1} French Land Register data, which excludes lakes, ponds, glaciers > 1 km^{2} (0.386 sq mi or 247 acres) and river estuaries.

Écuillé (French pronunciation: [ekɥije]) is a commune in the Maine-et-Loire department in western France.

== See also ==
- Château du Plessis-Bourré
- Communes of the Maine-et-Loire department
