= Baracé =

- Commune
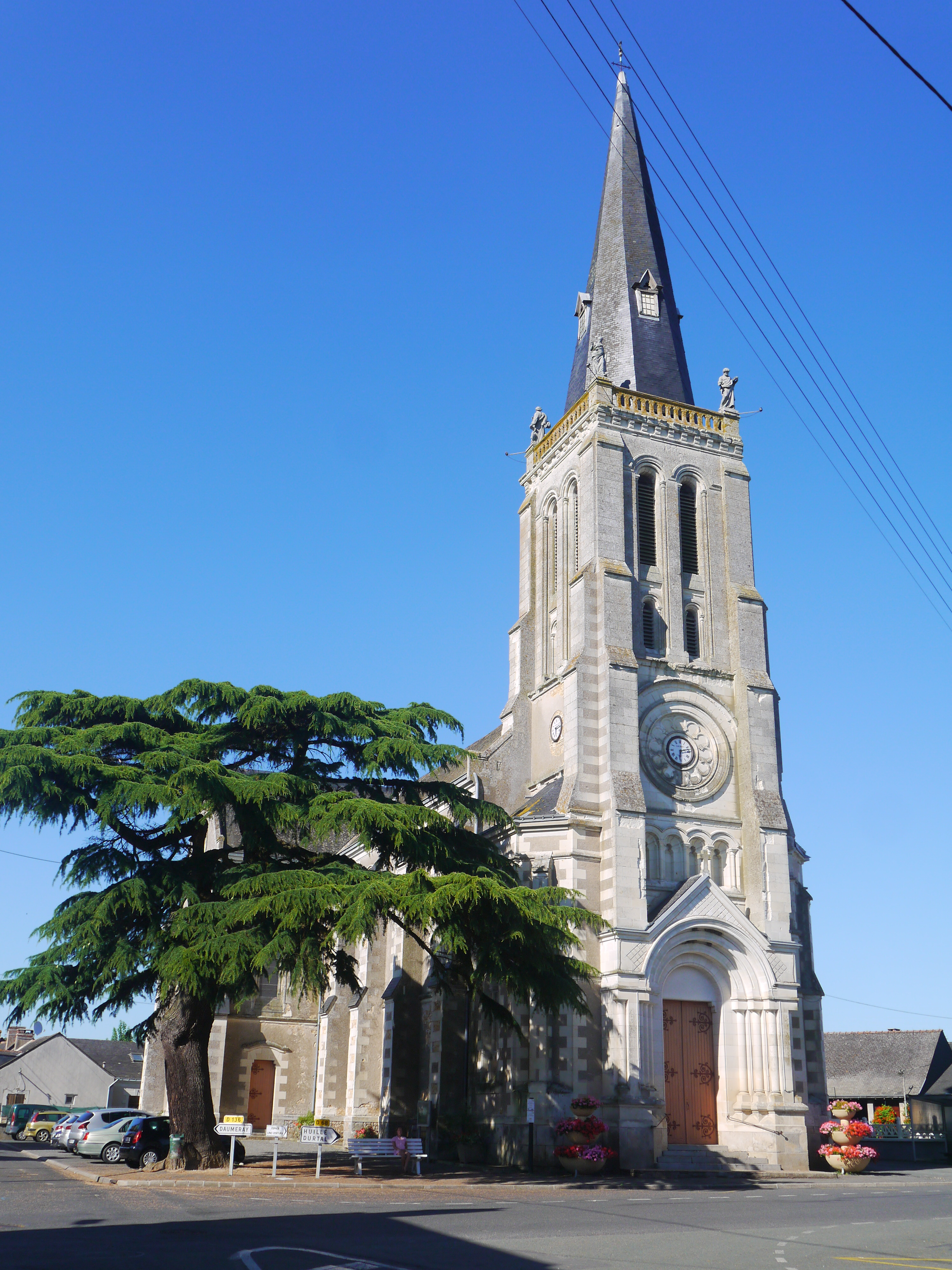
- The church in Baracé
- Location of Baracé
- Location within France Location within Pays de la Loire
- Coordinates: 47°38′27″N 0°21′26″W
- Country: France
- Region: Pays de la Loire
- Department: Maine-et-Loire
- Arrondissement: Angers
- Canton: Tiercé

Government
  - Mayor (2020–2026): Christine Richard
- Area^{1}: 13.46 km^{2} (5.20 sq mi)
- Elevation: 50 m (160 ft)
- Highest elevation: 62 m (203 ft)
- Lowest elevation: 17 m (56 ft)
- Population (2023): 636
  - Density: 47.3/km^{2} (122/sq mi)
- Time zone: UTC+01:00 (CET)
  - Summer (DST): UTC+02:00 (CEST)
- INSEE/Postal code: 49017 /49430
- ^{1} French Land Register data, which excludes lakes, ponds, glaciers > 1 km^{2} (0.386 sq mi or 247 acres) and river estuaries.

Baracé (French pronunciation: [baʁase]) is a commune in the Maine-et-Loire department in western France.

== Population ==
Historical population
Year	Pop.	±% p.a.
1968	384	—
1975	304	−3.28%
1982	312	+0.37%
1990	301	−0.45%
1999	317	+0.58%
2007	421	+3.61%
2012	507	+3.79%
2017	580	+2.73%
2023	636	+1.55%
Source: INSEE

== See also ==
- Communes of the Maine-et-Loire department
