= Arrondissement of Angers =

Coordinates: 47°28′N 0°34′W

Angers
- Arrondissement
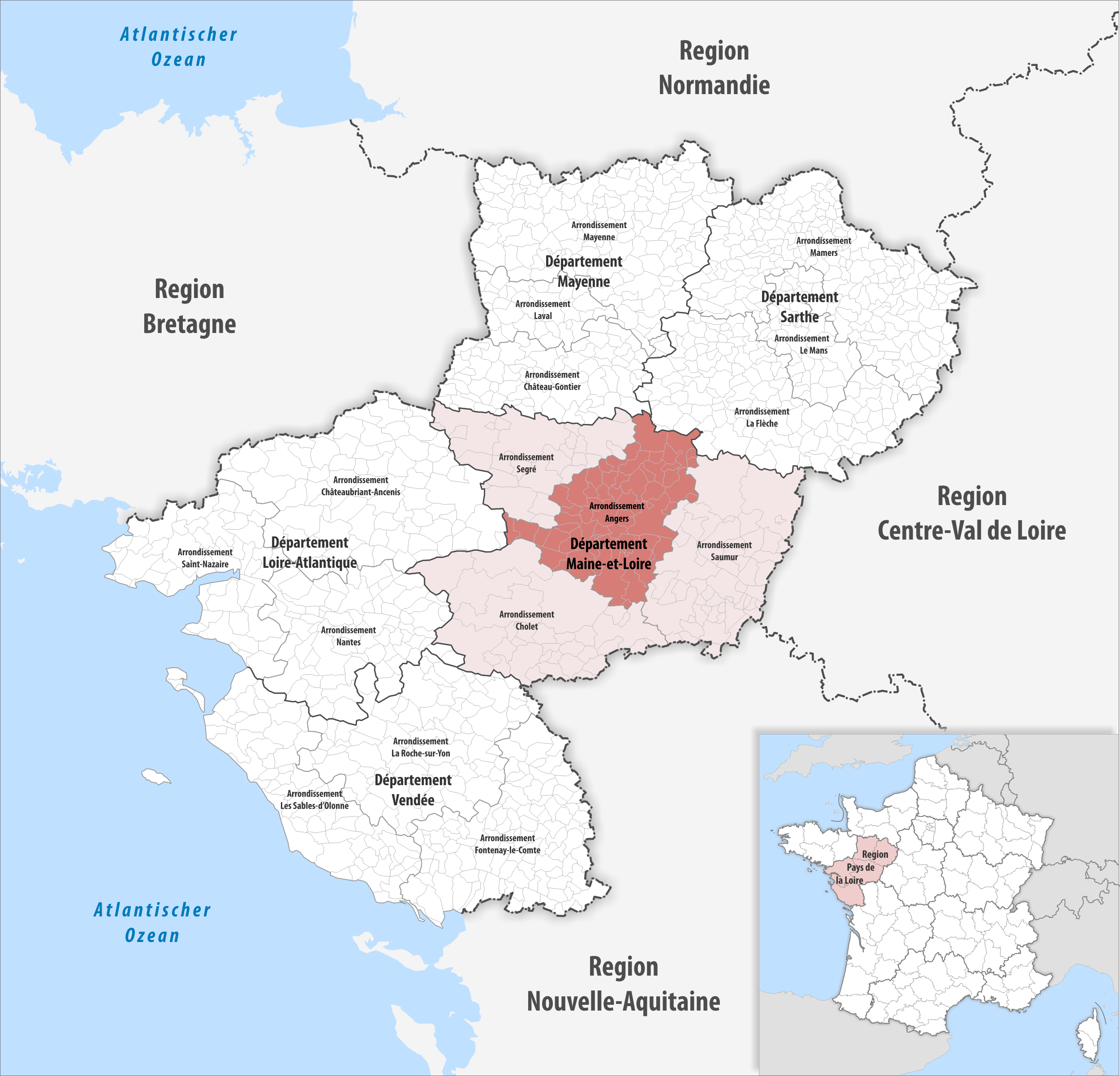
- Location within the region Pays de la Loire
- Country: France
- Region: Pays de la Loire
- Department: Maine-et-Loire
- No. of communes: {{{nbcomm}}}
- Area: 1,753.4 km^{2} (677.0 sq mi)
- Population (2023): 401,392
  - Density: 228.92/km^{2} (592.91/sq mi)
- INSEE code: 491

The arrondissement of Angers is an arrondissement of France in the Maine-et-Loire department in the Pays de la Loire region. It has 66 communes. Its population is 394,646 (2021), and its area is 1,753.4 km^{2} (677.0 sq mi).

== Composition ==
The communes of the arrondissement of Angers, and their INSEE codes, are:

1. Angers (49007)
2. Aubigné-sur-Layon (49012)
3. Avrillé (49015)
4. Baracé (49017)
5. Beaucouzé (49020)
6. Beaulieu-sur-Layon (49022)
7. Béhuard (49028)
8. Bellevigne-en-Layon (49345)
9. Blaison-Saint-Sulpice (49029)
10. Bouchemaine (49035)
11. Briollay (49048)
12. Brissac Loire Aubance (49050)
13. Cantenay-Épinard (49055)
14. Chalonnes-sur-Loire (49063)
15. Champtocé-sur-Loire (49068)
16. La Chapelle-Saint-Laud (49076)
17. Chaudefonds-sur-Layon (49082)
18. Cheffes (49090)
19. Cornillé-les-Caves (49107)
20. Corzé (49110)
21. Denée (49120)
22. Durtal (49127)
23. Écouflant (49129)
24. Écuillé (49130)
25. Étriché (49132)
26. Feneu (49135)
27. Les Garennes sur Loire (49167)
28. Huillé-Lézigné (49174)
29. Ingrandes-Le Fresne sur Loire (49160)
30. Jarzé-Villages (49163)
31. Loire-Authion (49307)
32. Longuenée-en-Anjou (49200)
33. Marcé (49188)
34. Montigné-lès-Rairies (49209)
35. Montreuil-Juigné (49214)
36. Montreuil-sur-Loir (49216)
37. Morannes sur Sarthe-Daumeray (49220)
38. Mozé-sur-Louet (49222)
39. Mûrs-Erigné (49223)
40. Le Plessis-Grammoire (49241)
41. Les Ponts-de-Cé (49246)
42. La Possonnière (49247)
43. Les Rairies (49257)
44. Rives-du-Loir-en-Anjou (49377)
45. Rochefort-sur-Loire (49259)
46. Saint-Barthélemy-d'Anjou (49267)
47. Saint-Clément-de-la-Place (49271)
48. Sainte-Gemmes-sur-Loire (49278)
49. Saint-Georges-sur-Loire (49283)
50. Saint-Germain-des-Prés (49284)
51. Saint-Jean-de-la-Croix (49288)
52. Saint-Lambert-la-Potherie (49294)
53. Saint-Léger-de-Linières (49298)
54. Saint-Martin-du-Fouilloux (49306)
55. Saint-Melaine-sur-Aubance (49308)
56. Sarrigné (49326)
57. Savennières (49329)
58. Seiches-sur-le-Loir (49333)
59. Sermaise (49334)
60. Soulaines-sur-Aubance (49338)
61. Soulaire-et-Bourg (49339)
62. Terranjou (49086)
63. Tiercé (49347)
64. Trélazé (49353)
65. Val-du-Layon (49292)
66. Verrières-en-Anjou (49323)

== History ==
The arrondissement of Angers was created in 1800. At the January 2017 reorganisation of the arrondissements of Maine-et-Loire, it gained two communes from the arrondissement of Saumur, and it lost four communes to the arrondissement of Saumur and four communes to the arrondissement of Segré.

As a result of the reorganisation of the cantons of France which came into effect in 2015, the borders of the cantons are no longer related to the borders of the arrondissements. The cantons of the arrondissement of Angers were, as of January 2015:

1. Angers-Centre
2. Angers-Est
3. Angers-Nord
4. Angers-Nord-Est
5. Angers-Nord-Ouest
6. Angers-Ouest
7. Angers-Sud
8. Angers-Trélazé
9. Beaufort-en-Vallée
10. Chalonnes-sur-Loire
11. Durtal
12. Le Louroux-Béconnais
13. Les Ponts-de-Cé
14. Saint-Georges-sur-Loire
15. Seiches-sur-le-Loir
16. Thouarcé
17. Tiercé
