= Les Rairies =

- Commune
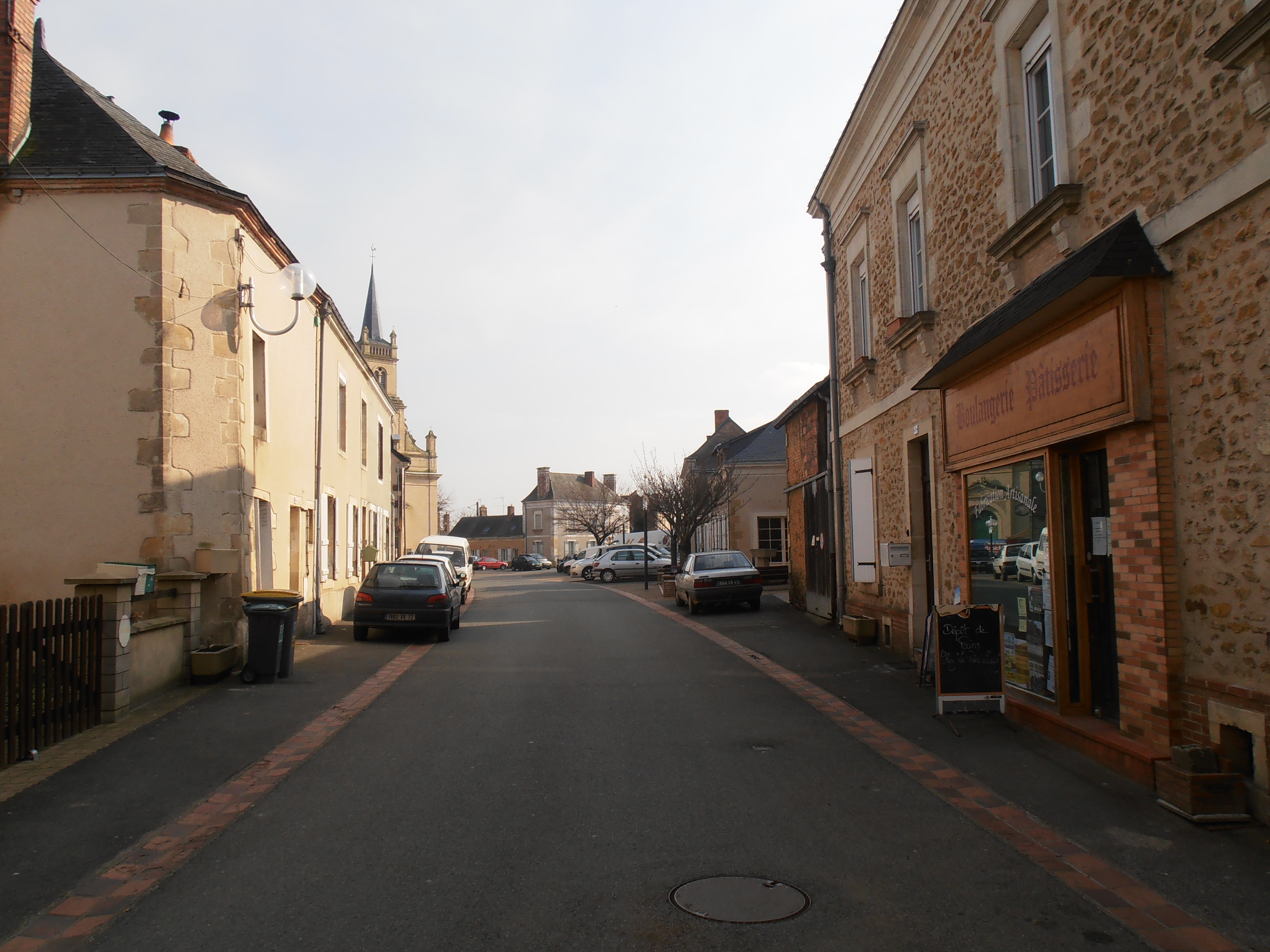
- The centre of Les Rairies
- Location of Les Rairies
- Location within France Location within Pays de la Loire
- Coordinates: 47°39′06″N 0°12′16″W
- Country: France
- Region: Pays de la Loire
- Department: Maine-et-Loire
- Arrondissement: Angers
- Canton: Tiercé

Government
  - Mayor (2020–2026): Joëlle Charrier
- Area^{1}: 8.41 km^{2} (3.25 sq mi)
- Highest elevation: 43 m (141 ft)
- Lowest elevation: 22 m (72 ft)
- Population (2023): 1,041
  - Density: 124/km^{2} (321/sq mi)
- Demonym(s): Rairieux, Rairieuse
- Time zone: UTC+01:00 (CET)
  - Summer (DST): UTC+02:00 (CEST)
- INSEE/Postal code: 49257 /49430
- ^{1} French Land Register data, which excludes lakes, ponds, glaciers > 1 km^{2} (0.386 sq mi or 247 acres) and river estuaries.

Les Rairies (French pronunciation: [le ʁɛʁi]) is a commune in the Maine-et-Loire department in western France.

== See also ==
- Communes of the Maine-et-Loire department
