= Canton of Tiercé =

Coordinates: 47.61°N 0.47°W

The canton of Tiercé is an administrative division of the Maine-et-Loire department, in western France. Its borders were modified at the French canton reorganisation which came into effect in March 2015. Its seat is in Tiercé.

It consists of the following communes:

1. Baracé
2. Chambellay
3. Cheffes
4. Chenillé-Champteussé
5. Durtal
6. Erdre-en-Anjou (partly)
7. Étriché
8. Grez-Neuville
9. Les Hauts-d'Anjou
10. La Jaille-Yvon
11. Juvardeil
12. Le Lion-d'Angers
13. Longuenée-en-Anjou (partly)
14. Miré
15. Montigné-lès-Rairies
16. Montreuil-sur-Maine
17. Morannes sur Sarthe-Daumeray
18. Les Rairies
19. Sceaux-d'Anjou
20. Thorigné-d'Anjou
21. Tiercé
