= Feneu =

- Commune
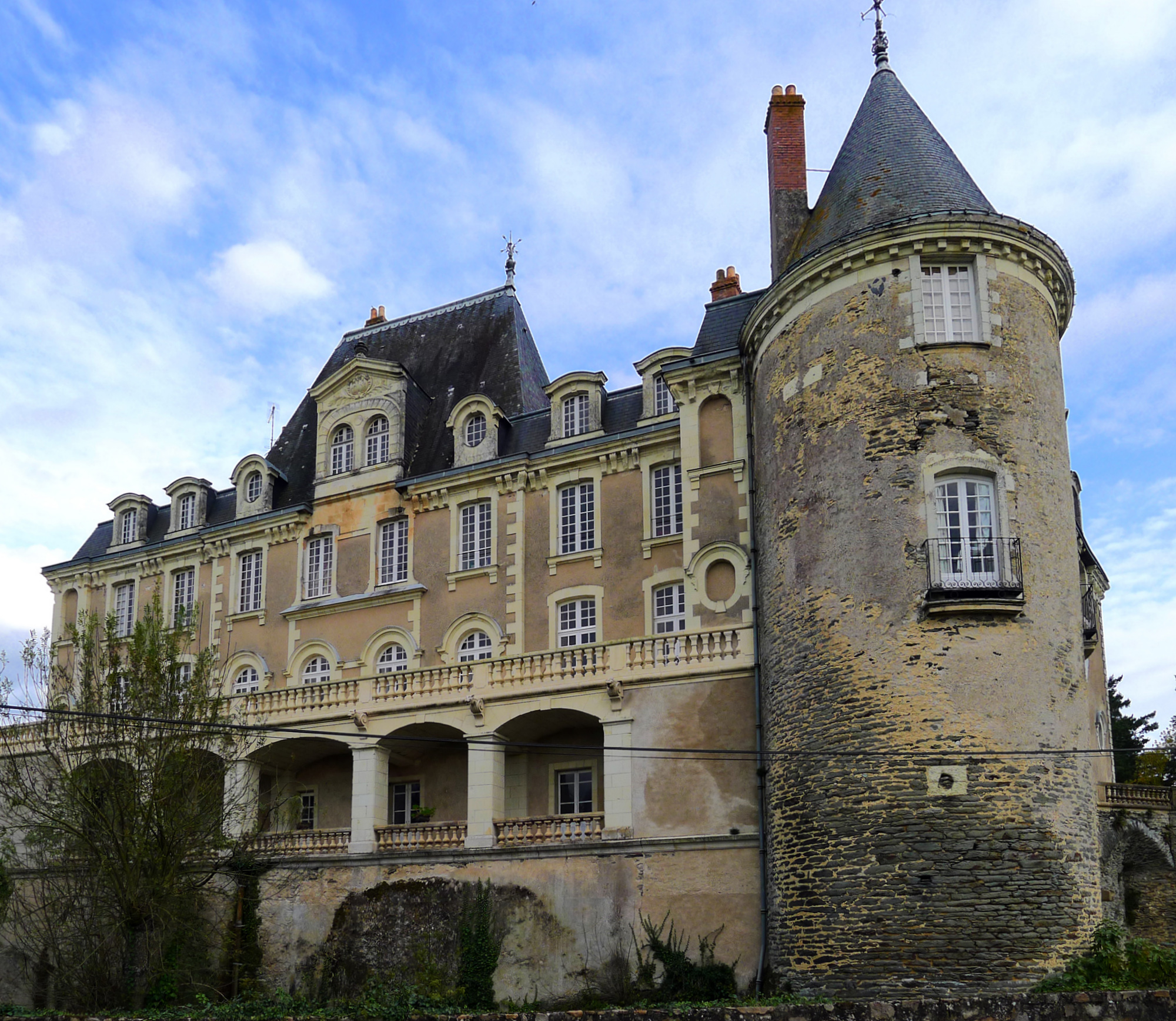
- The Château of Sautret
- Location of Feneu
- Location within France Location within Pays de la Loire
- Coordinates: 47°34′19″N 0°35′30″W
- Country: France
- Region: Pays de la Loire
- Department: Maine-et-Loire
- Arrondissement: Angers
- Canton: Angers-5
- Intercommunality: CU Angers Loire Métropole

Government
  - Mayor (2021–2026): Mickael Jousset
- Area^{1}: 25.52 km^{2} (9.85 sq mi)
- Elevation: 45 m (148 ft)
- Highest elevation: 67 m (220 ft)
- Lowest elevation: 12 m (39 ft)
- Population (2023): 2,212
  - Density: 86.68/km^{2} (224.5/sq mi)
- Demonym(s): Fanouin, Fanouine
- Time zone: UTC+01:00 (CET)
  - Summer (DST): UTC+02:00 (CEST)
- INSEE/Postal code: 49135 /49460
- ^{1} French Land Register data, which excludes lakes, ponds, glaciers > 1 km^{2} (0.386 sq mi or 247 acres) and river estuaries.

Feneu (French pronunciation: [fənø]) is a commune in the Maine-et-Loire department in western France.

== Population ==
Historical population
Year	Pop.	±% p.a.
1968	1,100	—
1975	1,208	+1.35%
1982	1,509	+3.23%
1990	1,676	+1.32%
1999	1,799	+0.79%
2007	2,074	+1.79%
2012	2,172	+0.93%
2017	2,193	+0.19%
2023	2,212	+0.14%
Source: INSEE

== See also ==
- Communes of the Maine-et-Loire department
