= Canton of Vihiers =

Coordinates: 47°08′12″N 0°29′42″W

The Canton of Vihiers is a former French canton located in the Maine-et-Loire département of France, in the arrondissement of Saumur. It had 15,365 inhabitants (2012). It was disbanded following the French canton reorganisation which came into effect in March 2015.

The canton comprised the following communes:

- Aubigné-sur-Layon
- Cernusson
- Les Cerqueux-sous-Passavant
- Cléré-sur-Layon
- Coron
- La Fosse-de-Tigné
- Montilliers
- Nueil-sur-Layon
- Passavant-sur-Layon
- La Plaine
- Saint-Paul-du-Bois
- La Salle-de-Vihiers
- Somloire
- Tigné
- Trémont
- Tancoigné
- Vihiers

== See also ==
- Cantons of the Maine-et-Loire department
- Communes of the Maine-et-Loire department
