= Cholet 3rd Canton =

Coordinates: 47°01′52″N 0°53′27″W

Cholet-3
- Former canton
- Interactive map of Cholet-3
- Country: France
- Region: Pays de la Loire
- Department: Maine-et-Loire
- No. of communes: {{{nbcomm}}}
- Disbanded: 2015
- Area: 82 km^{2} (32 sq mi)
- Population (2012): 28,939
  - Density: 350/km^{2} (910/sq mi)

Cholet 3rd Canton is a former canton of France, located in the Maine-et-Loire department, in the Pays de la Loire region. It had 28,939 inhabitants (2012). It was disbanded following the French canton reorganisation which came into effect in March 2015.

The canton comprised the following communes:

1. Cholet (partly)
2. Saint-Christophe-du-Bois
3. La Tessoualle

== See also ==
- Cholet 1st Canton
- Cholet 2nd Canton
- Arrondissement of Cholet
- Cantons of the Maine-et-Loire department
- Communes of the Maine-et-Loire department
