= Les Cerqueux-sous-Passavant =

- Part of Lys-Haut-Layon
- Location of Les Cerqueux-sous-Passavant
- Location within France Location within Pays de la Loire
- Coordinates: 47°06′32″N 0°27′53″W
- Country: France
- Region: Pays de la Loire
- Department: Maine-et-Loire
- Arrondissement: Cholet
- Canton: Cholet-2
- Commune: Lys-Haut-Layon
- Area^{1}: 23.24 km^{2} (8.97 sq mi)
- Elevation: 112 m (367 ft)
- Highest elevation: 127 m (417 ft)
- Lowest elevation: 84 m (276 ft)
- Population (2022): 492
  - Density: 21.2/km^{2} (54.8/sq mi)
- Demonym(s): Cerqueunais, Cerqueunaise
- Time zone: UTC+01:00 (CET)
  - Summer (DST): UTC+02:00 (CEST)
- Postal code: 49310
- ^{1} French Land Register data, which excludes lakes, ponds, glaciers > 1 km^{2} (0.386 sq mi or 247 acres) and river estuaries.

Les Cerqueux-sous-Passavant (French pronunciation: [le sɛʁkø su pasavɑ̃], literally Les Cerqueux under Passavant) is a former commune in the Maine-et-Loire department in western France. On 1 January 2016, it was merged into the new commune of Lys-Haut-Layon.

== See also ==
- Communes of the Maine-et-Loire department
