= Nueil-sur-Layon =

- Part of Lys-Haut-Layon
- Location of Nueil-sur-Layon
- Location within France Location within Pays de la Loire
- Coordinates: 47°07′08″N 0°21′55″W
- Country: France
- Region: Pays de la Loire
- Department: Maine-et-Loire
- Arrondissement: Cholet
- Canton: Cholet-2
- Commune: Lys-Haut-Layon
- Area^{1}: 61.23 km^{2} (23.64 sq mi)
- Elevation: 90 m (300 ft)
- Highest elevation: 123 m (404 ft)
- Lowest elevation: 57 m (187 ft)
- Population (2022): 1,307
  - Density: 21.35/km^{2} (55.29/sq mi)
- Demonym(s): Nueillais, Nueillaise
- Time zone: UTC+01:00 (CET)
  - Summer (DST): UTC+02:00 (CEST)
- Postal code: 49560
- Website: www.nueilsurlayon.fr
- ^{1} French Land Register data, which excludes lakes, ponds, glaciers > 1 km^{2} (0.386 sq mi or 247 acres) and river estuaries.

Nueil-sur-Layon (French pronunciation: [nɥɛj syʁ lɛjɔ̃], literally Nueil on Layon) is a former commune in the Maine-et-Loire department in western France. On 1 January 2016, it was merged into the new commune of Lys-Haut-Layon.

== Geography ==
The village lies on the left bank of the Layon, which flows northeastward through the southern part of the commune.

== See also ==
- Communes of the Maine-et-Loire department
