= Vihiers =

Part of Lys-Haut-Layon in Pays de la Loire, France

- Delegated commune of Lys-Haut-Layon
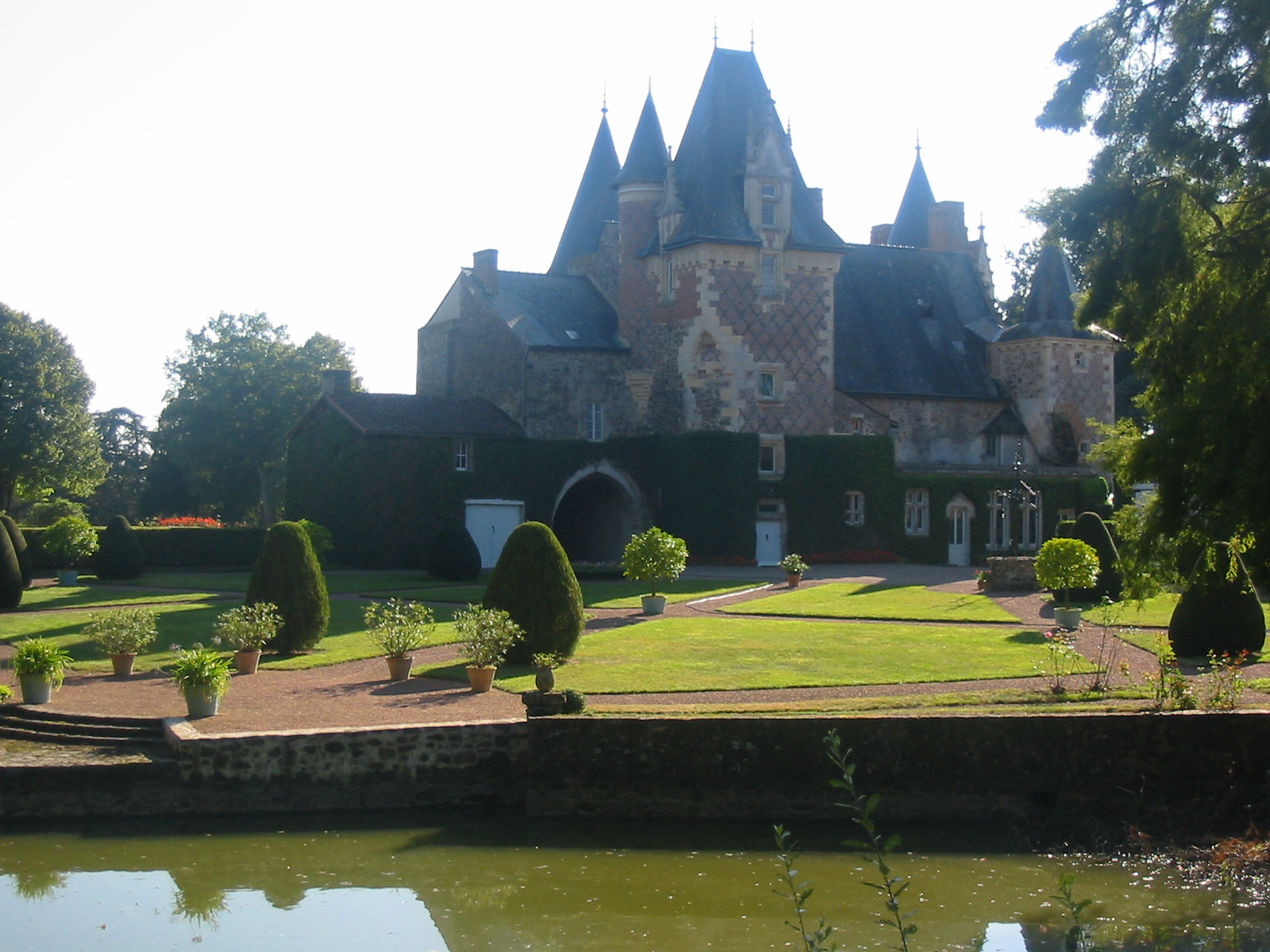

- Coat of arms
- Location of Vihiers
- Location within France Location within Pays de la Loire
- Coordinates: 47°08′50″N 0°31′57″W
- Country: France
- Region: Pays de la Loire
- Department: Maine-et-Loire
- Arrondissement: Cholet
- Canton: Cholet-2
- Commune: Lys-Haut-Layon
- Area^{1}: 59.7 km^{2} (23.1 sq mi)
- Highest elevation: 211 m (692 ft)
- Lowest elevation: 52 m (171 ft)
- Population (2022): 2,298
  - Density: 38.5/km^{2} (99.7/sq mi)
- Demonym(s): Vihiersois, Vihiersoise
- Time zone: UTC+01:00 (CET)
  - Summer (DST): UTC+02:00 (CEST)
- Postal code: 49310
- Website: lyshautlayon.fr
- ^{1} French Land Register data, which excludes lakes, ponds, glaciers > 1 km^{2} (0.386 sq mi or 247 acres) and river estuaries.

Vihiers (French pronunciation: [vije]) is a former commune in the Maine-et-Loire department in western France. On 1 January 2016, it was merged into the new commune of Lys-Haut-Layon.

== Geography ==
Vihiers is around 30 km south of Angers, around 30 km northeast of Cholet, and around 80 km east of Nantes. Main road D960 skirts the village. Public transport is provided by the regional bus company Aléop (services to Angers, Cholet and Saumur) and the local bus company Choletbus.

== History ==
In January 1974 the former communes of Saint-Hilaire-du-Bois and Le Voide were merged into the commune of Vihiers. At the creation of the commune nouvelle of Lys-Haut-Layon in 2016, the three former communes Vihiers, Saint-Hilaire-du-Bois and Le Voide became delegated communes.

== Notable people ==
- Henry Nicollon des Abbayes (1898-1974), professor of botany who was an authority on lichens, and also undertook a noted study of the flora of Brittany, was born in Vihiers.

== See also ==
- Communes of the Maine-et-Loire department
