= Trémont, Maine-et-Loire =

Trémont
- Part of Lys-Haut-Layon
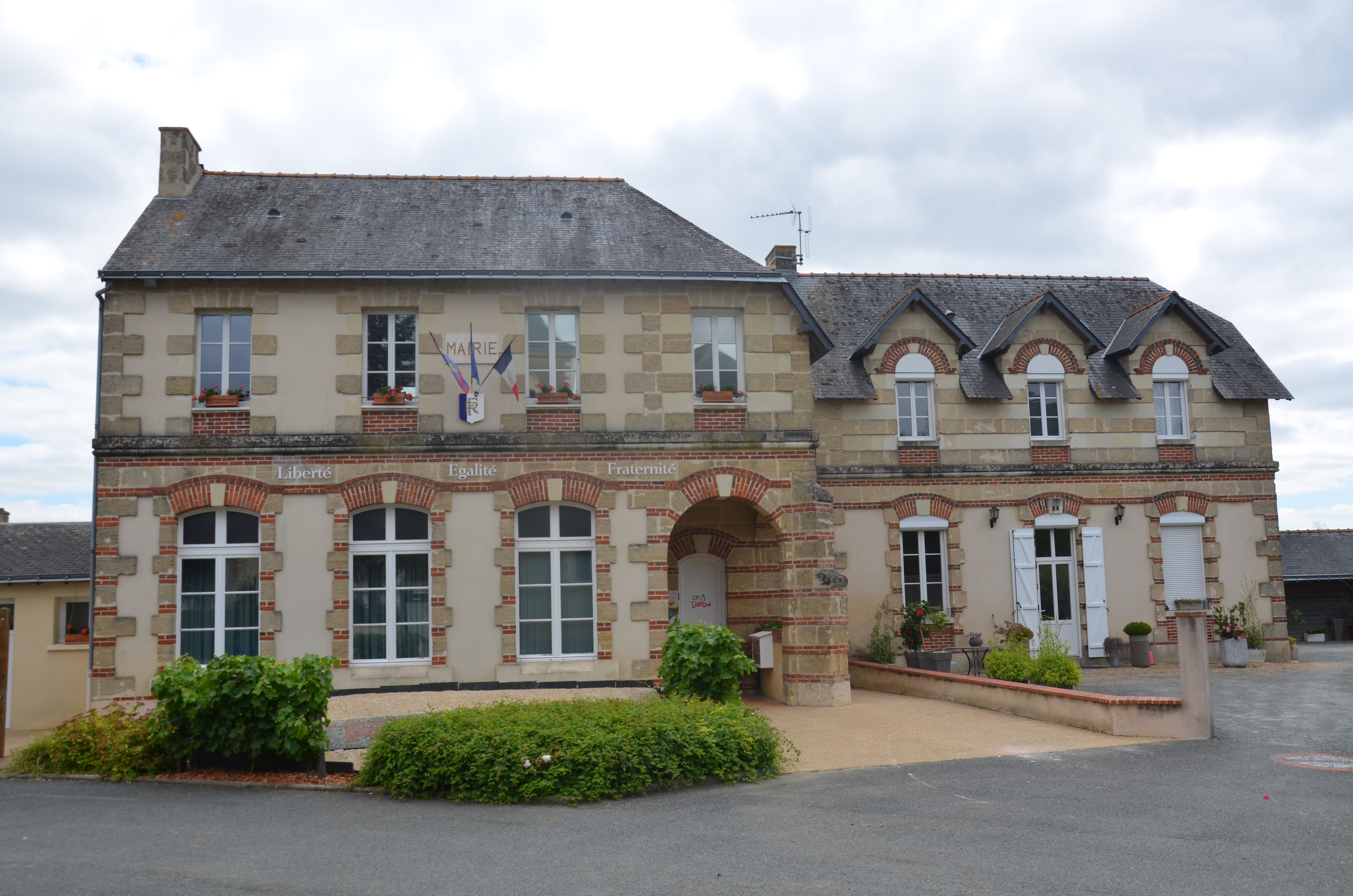
- Town hall
- Location of Trémont
- Location within France Location within Pays de la Loire
- Coordinates: 47°09′32″N 0°26′44″W
- Country: France
- Region: Pays de la Loire
- Department: Maine-et-Loire
- Arrondissement: Cholet
- Canton: Cholet-2
- Commune: Lys-Haut-Layon
- Area^{1}: 8.1 km^{2} (3.1 sq mi)
- Elevation: 74 m (243 ft)
- Highest elevation: 116 m (381 ft)
- Lowest elevation: 65 m (213 ft)
- Population (2022): 355
  - Density: 44/km^{2} (110/sq mi)
- Demonym(s): Trémontois, Trémontoise
- Time zone: UTC+01:00 (CET)
  - Summer (DST): UTC+02:00 (CEST)
- Postal code: 49310
- ^{1} French Land Register data, which excludes lakes, ponds, glaciers > 1 km^{2} (0.386 sq mi or 247 acres) and river estuaries.

Trémont (French pronunciation: [tʁemɔ̃]) is a former commune in the Maine-et-Loire department in western France. On 1 January 2016, it was merged into the new commune of Lys-Haut-Layon.

== See also ==
- Communes of the Maine-et-Loire department
