= Tigné =

- Part of Lys-Haut-Layon
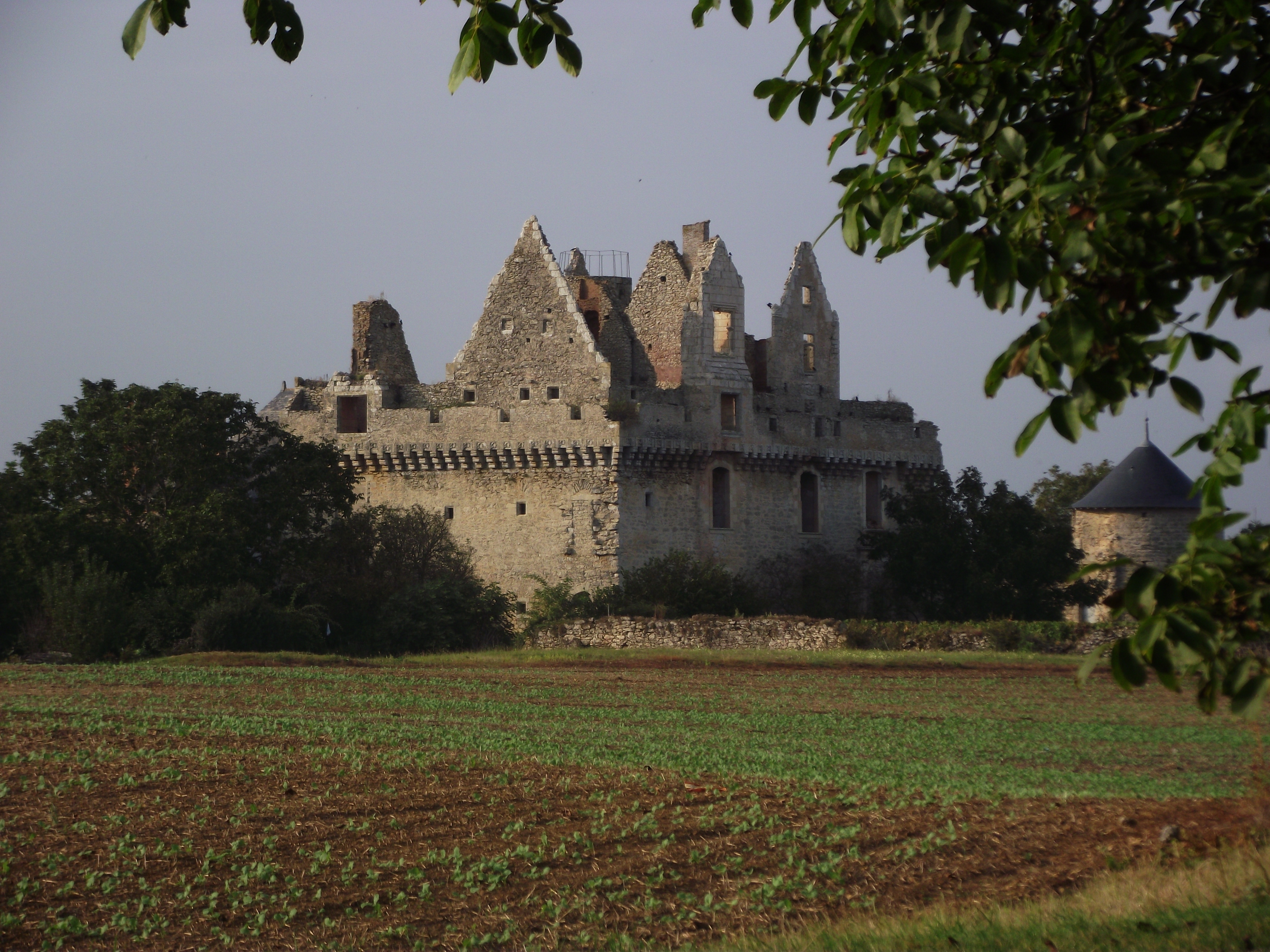
- Ruins of Château du Grand-Riou
- Location of Tigné
- Location within France Location within Pays de la Loire
- Coordinates: 47°12′05″N 0°25′38″W
- Country: France
- Region: Pays de la Loire
- Department: Maine-et-Loire
- Arrondissement: Cholet
- Canton: Cholet-2
- Commune: Lys-Haut-Layon
- Area^{1}: 16.78 km^{2} (6.48 sq mi)
- Elevation: 59 m (194 ft)
- Highest elevation: 98 m (322 ft)
- Lowest elevation: 37 m (121 ft)
- Population (2022): 722
  - Density: 43.0/km^{2} (111/sq mi)
- Demonym(s): Tignéen, Tignéenne
- Time zone: UTC+01:00 (CET)
  - Summer (DST): UTC+02:00 (CEST)
- Postal code: 49540
- ^{1} French Land Register data, which excludes lakes, ponds, glaciers > 1 km^{2} (0.386 sq mi or 247 acres) and river estuaries.

Tigné (French pronunciation: [tiɲe]) is a small village, administratively a former commune, in the Maine-et-Loire department in western France. On January 1, 2016 it became a delegated commune within the new commune of Lys-Haut-Layon. Wines produced in the commune carry the protected name Coteaux-du-Layon. As of 2022, the village has 722 inhabitants.

== Geography ==
The commune is traversed by the river Layon on its north side. The river creates a natural boundary with the neighboring village, Martigné-Briand. It is located in the "Couloir du Layon", a geographical area composed of winelands along the Layon river, a tributary of the Loire. Attached administratively to Saumur, Tigné borders the Pays des Mauges and the Saumurois.

== Cultural and architectural heritage ==
Buildings in Tigné classified as Historical Monuments:

- Chapelle Sainte-Anne, 12 and 17th centuries, registered Historical Monument by Ministerial Order of 17 July 1926.
- Château du Grand-Riou, registered Historical Monument by Ministerial Order of 19 May 1988 for the remaining ruins. Built in the 15th century and partially destroyed by fire in 1792, the château remains in ruins.
- Manoir Saint-Jacques Saint-Jean, la Roche Coutant, 16th and 17th centuries, registered Historical Monument by Ministerial Order of 23 January 1989.

Other buildings of historical and cultural interest:

- Château de Tigné, château and winelands from the 14th and 19th centuries, property of the French actor and winemaker Gérard Depardieu since 1989.
- Eglise Saint-Pierre, Roman Catholic Church built between 1860 and 1863. Its stained glass windows are a major feature.

== See also ==
- Communes of the Maine-et-Loire department
