= La Fosse-de-Tigné =

- Part of Lys-Haut-Layon
- Location of La Fosse-de-Tigné
- Location within France Location within Pays de la Loire
- Coordinates: 47°10′57″N 0°25′43″W
- Country: France
- Region: Pays de la Loire
- Department: Maine-et-Loire
- Arrondissement: Cholet
- Canton: Cholet-2
- Commune: Lys-Haut-Layon
- Area^{1}: 5.54 km^{2} (2.14 sq mi)
- Elevation: 69 m (226 ft)
- Highest elevation: 112 m (367 ft)
- Lowest elevation: 52 m (171 ft)
- Population (2022): 234
  - Density: 42.2/km^{2} (109/sq mi)
- Demonym(s): Fosséen, Fosséenne
- Time zone: UTC+01:00 (CET)
  - Summer (DST): UTC+02:00 (CEST)
- Postal code: 49540
- ^{1} French Land Register data, which excludes lakes, ponds, glaciers > 1 km^{2} (0.386 sq mi or 247 acres) and river estuaries.

La Fosse-de-Tigné (French pronunciation: [la fos də tiɲe]) is a former commune in the Maine-et-Loire department in western France. On 1 January 2016, it was merged into the new commune of Lys-Haut-Layon.

== See also ==
- Communes of the Maine-et-Loire department
