= Tancoigné =

- Part of Lys-Haut-Layon
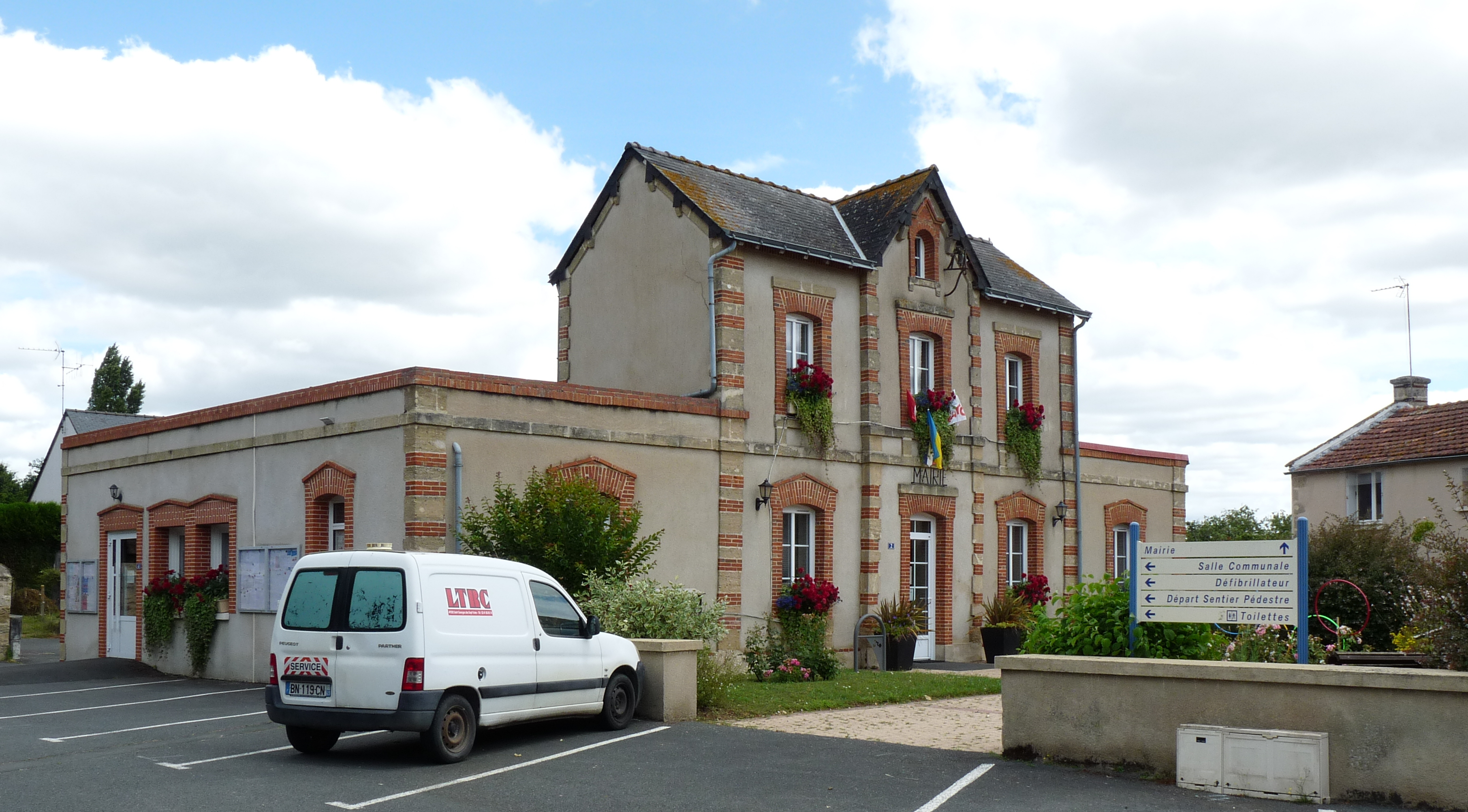
- Tancoigné Town hall
- Location of Tancoigné
- Location within France Location within Pays de la Loire
- Coordinates: 47°10′32″N 0°24′26″W
- Country: France
- Region: Pays de la Loire
- Department: Maine-et-Loire
- Arrondissement: Cholet
- Canton: Cholet-2
- Commune: Lys-Haut-Layon
- Area^{1}: 4.25 km^{2} (1.64 sq mi)
- Highest elevation: 91 m (299 ft)
- Lowest elevation: 53 m (174 ft)
- Population (2022): 310
  - Density: 73/km^{2} (190/sq mi)
- Demonym(s): Tancoignéen, Tancoignéenne
- Time zone: UTC+01:00 (CET)
  - Summer (DST): UTC+02:00 (CEST)
- Postal code: 49310
- ^{1} French Land Register data, which excludes lakes, ponds, glaciers > 1 km^{2} (0.386 sq mi or 247 acres) and river estuaries.

Tancoigné (French pronunciation: [tɑ̃kwaɲe]) is a former commune in the Maine-et-Loire department in western France. On 1 January 2016, it was merged into the new commune of Lys-Haut-Layon.

== See also ==
- Communes of the Maine-et-Loire department
