= Saint-Léger-sous-Cholet =

- Commune
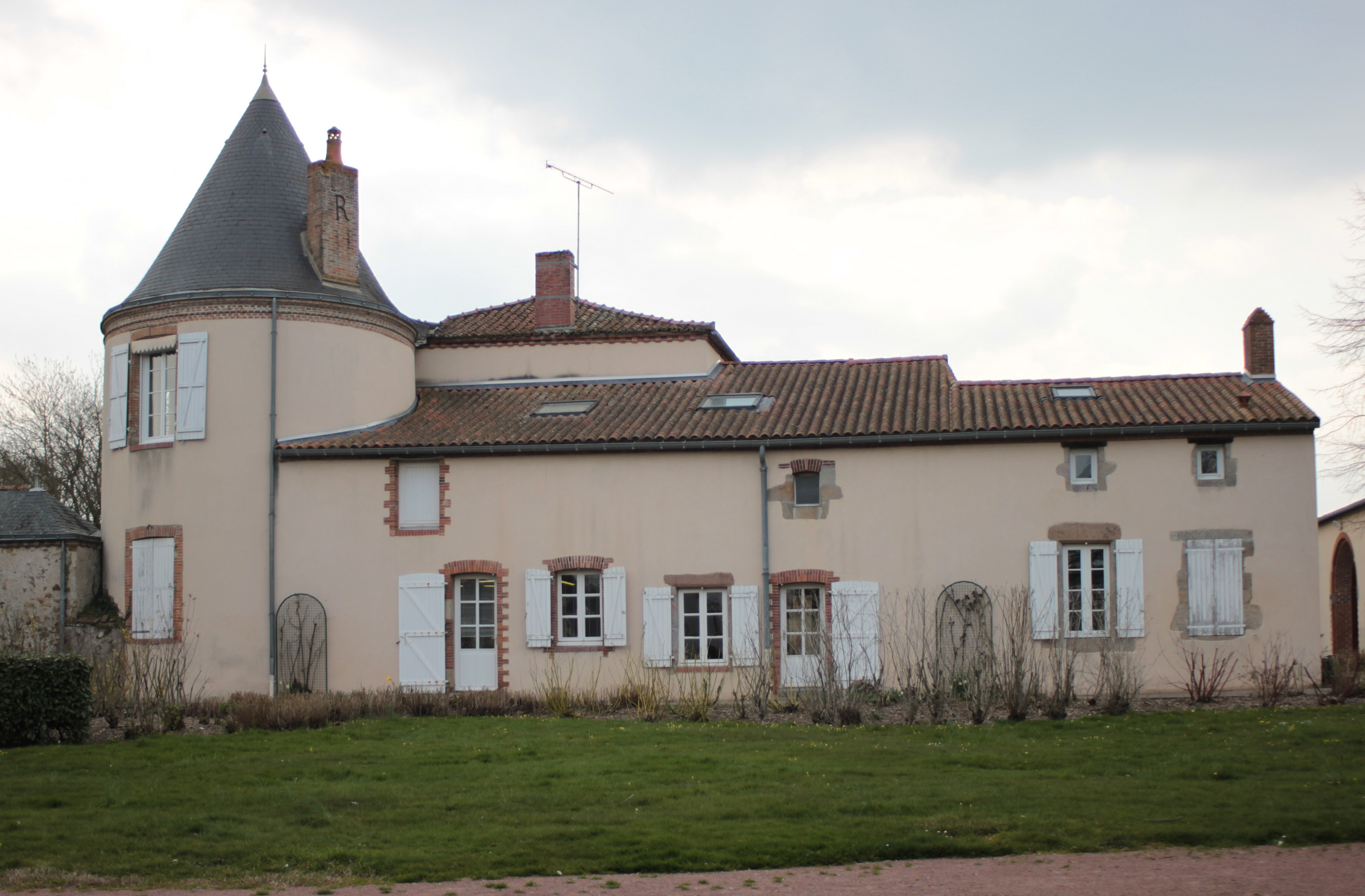
- The town hall of Saint-Léger-sous-Cholet

- Coat of arms
- Location of Saint-Léger-sous-Cholet
- Location within France Location within Pays de la Loire
- Coordinates: 47°05′35″N 0°54′29″W
- Country: France
- Region: Pays de la Loire
- Department: Maine-et-Loire
- Arrondissement: Cholet
- Canton: Sèvremoine
- Intercommunality: CA Cholet Agglomération

Government
  - Mayor (2020–2026): Jean-Paul Olivares
- Area^{1}: 9.72 km^{2} (3.75 sq mi)
- Highest elevation: 132 m (433 ft)
- Lowest elevation: 93 m (305 ft)
- Population (2023): 3,106
  - Density: 320/km^{2} (828/sq mi)
- Time zone: UTC+01:00 (CET)
  - Summer (DST): UTC+02:00 (CEST)
- INSEE/Postal code: 49299 /49280
- ^{1} French Land Register data, which excludes lakes, ponds, glaciers > 1 km^{2} (0.386 sq mi or 247 acres) and river estuaries.

Saint-Léger-sous-Cholet (French pronunciation: [sɛ̃ leʒe su ʃɔlɛ], literally Saint-Léger under Cholet) is a commune in the Maine-et-Loire department in western France.

== History ==
Before the French Revolution, the town and the north of the village (Haut-Saint-Léger) depended on Le May-sur-Èvre, the south (Bas-Saint-Léger) on Mortagne-sur-Sèvre.

The town was created by decree of Emperor Napoleon III on 14 December 1863, its territory was then a section of the town of Le May-sur-Evre.

From 1899 to 1947, the town was crossed by the Petit Anjou railway line (Cholet-Nantes, via Beaupréau and Le Loroux-Bottereau) which had a station there.

== Population ==
Historical population
Year	Pop.	±% p.a.
1968	701	—
1975	1,236	+8.44%
1982	1,857	+5.99%
1990	2,470	+3.63%
1999	2,604	+0.59%
2007	2,438	−0.82%
2012	2,552	+0.92%
2017	2,930	+2.80%
2023	3,106	+0.98%
Source: INSEE

== See also ==
- Communes of the Maine-et-Loire department
