= Nuaillé =

- Commune
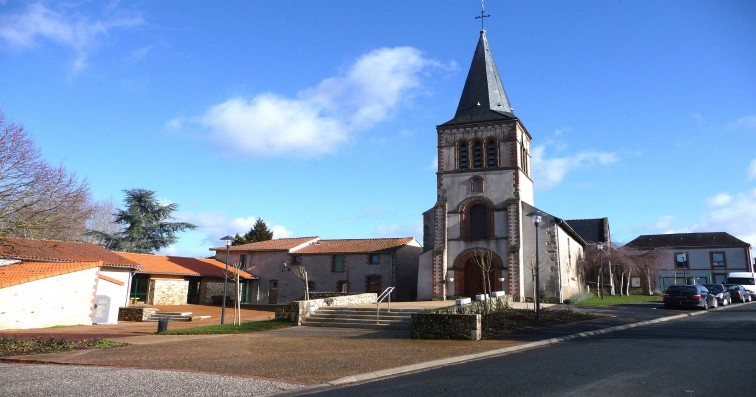
- The church in Nuaillé
- Location of Nuaillé
- Location within France Location within Pays de la Loire
- Coordinates: 47°05′43″N 0°47′40″W
- Country: France
- Region: Pays de la Loire
- Department: Maine-et-Loire
- Arrondissement: Cholet
- Canton: Cholet-2
- Intercommunality: CA Cholet Agglomération

Government
  - Mayor (2020–2026): Christophe Piet
- Area^{1}: 13.61 km^{2} (5.25 sq mi)
- Elevation: 132 m (433 ft)
- Highest elevation: 187 m (614 ft)
- Lowest elevation: 109 m (358 ft)
- Population (2023): 1,459
  - Density: 107.2/km^{2} (277.6/sq mi)
- Demonym(s): Nuaillais, Nuaillaise
- Time zone: UTC+01:00 (CET)
  - Summer (DST): UTC+02:00 (CEST)
- INSEE/Postal code: 49231 /49340
- Website: www.nuaille.com
- ^{1} French Land Register data, which excludes lakes, ponds, glaciers > 1 km^{2} (0.386 sq mi or 247 acres) and river estuaries.

Nuaillé (French pronunciation: [nɥaje]) is a commune in the Maine-et-Loire department in western France.

== See also ==
- Communes of the Maine-et-Loire department
