= Yzernay =

- Commune
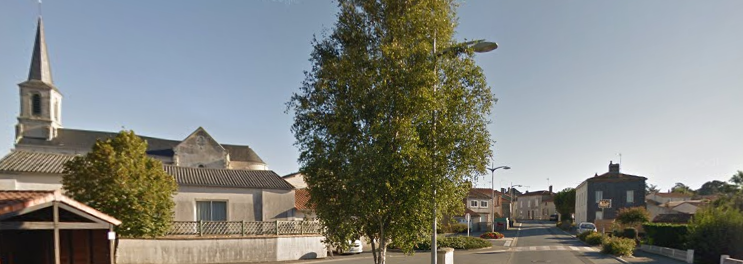
- The landscape of Yzernay

- Coat of arms
- Location of Yzernay
- Location within France Location within Pays de la Loire
- Coordinates: 47°01′20″N 0°42′06″W
- Country: France
- Region: Pays de la Loire
- Department: Maine-et-Loire
- Arrondissement: Cholet
- Canton: Cholet-2
- Intercommunality: CA Cholet Agglomération

Government
  - Mayor (2020–2026): Dominique Séchet
- Area^{1}: 40.66 km^{2} (15.70 sq mi)
- Highest elevation: 184 m (604 ft)
- Lowest elevation: 122 m (400 ft)
- Population (2023): 1,855
  - Density: 45.62/km^{2} (118.2/sq mi)
- Demonym(s): Yzernois, Yzernoises
- Time zone: UTC+01:00 (CET)
  - Summer (DST): UTC+02:00 (CEST)
- INSEE/Postal code: 49381 /49360
- ^{1} French Land Register data, which excludes lakes, ponds, glaciers > 1 km^{2} (0.386 sq mi or 247 acres) and river estuaries.

Yzernay (French pronunciation: [izɛʁnɛ]) is a commune in the Maine-et-Loire department in western France.

== Population ==
Historical population

Year	Pop.	±% p.a.
1793	1,370	—
1800	966	−4.87%
1806	1,110	+2.34%
1821	1,417	+1.64%
1831	1,601	+1.23%
1836	1,507	−1.20%
1841	1,564	+0.75%
1846	1,774	+2.55%
1851	1,945	+1.86%
1856	1,981	+0.37%
1861	1,993	+0.12%
1866	1,902	−0.93%
1872	1,811	−0.81%
1876	1,777	−0.47%
1881	1,746	−0.35%
1886	1,730	−0.18%
1891	1,674	−0.66%
1896	1,609	−0.79%
1901	1,579	−0.38%

Year	Pop.	±% p.a.
1906	1,441	−1.81%
1911	1,442	+0.01%
1921	1,272	−1.25%
1926	1,271	−0.02%
1931	1,296	+0.39%
1936	1,251	−0.70%
1946	1,244	−0.06%
1954	1,236	−0.08%
1962	1,288	+0.52%
1968	1,283	−0.06%
1975	1,421	+1.47%
1982	1,545	+1.20%
1990	1,634	+0.70%
1999	1,576	−0.40%
2007	1,660	+0.65%
2012	1,812	+1.77%
2017	1,841	+0.32%
2023	1,855	+0.13%

Source: EHESS (1793-1999) and INSEE

== See also ==
- Communes of the Maine-et-Loire department
