= La Séguinière =

- Commune
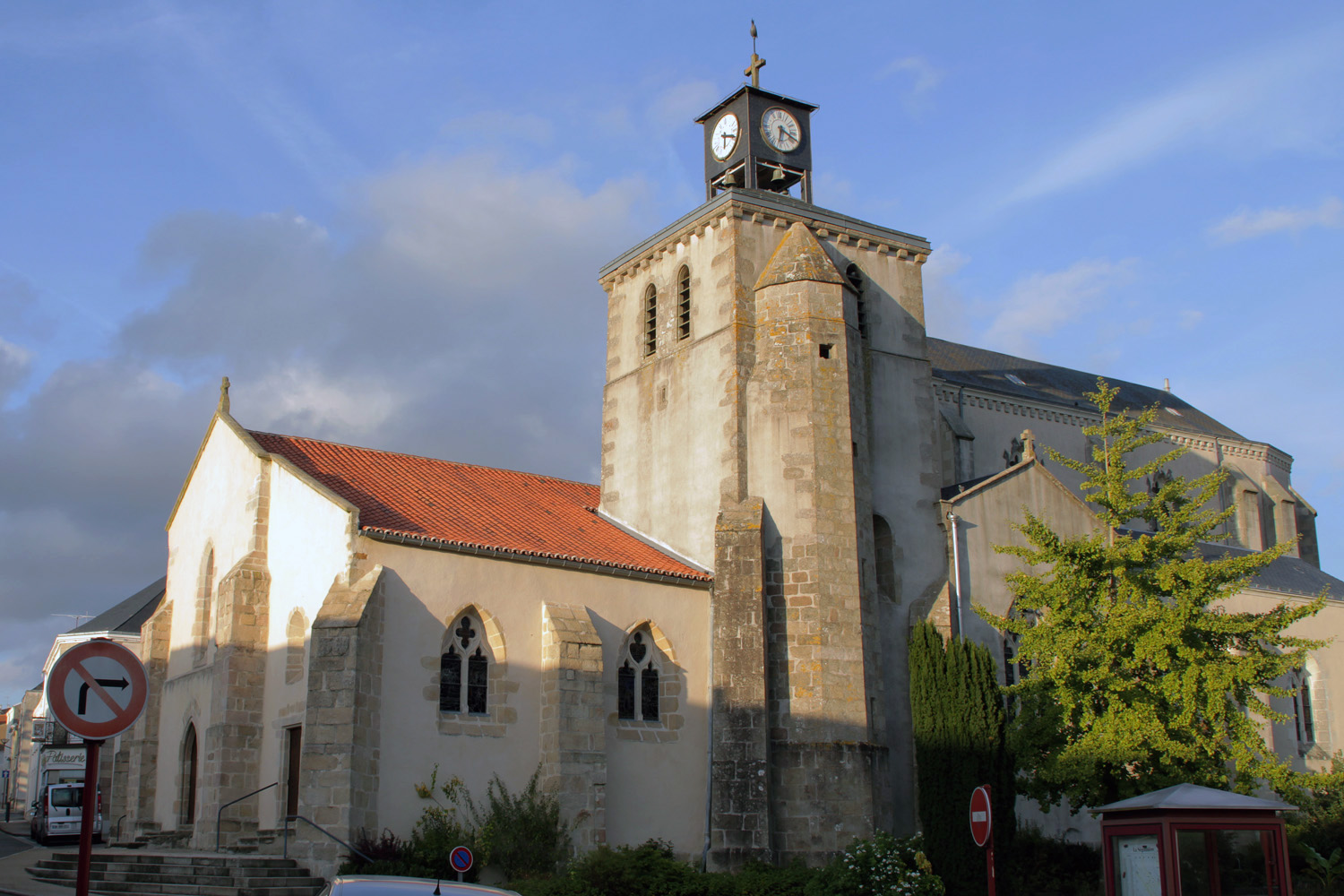
- The church of Notre-Dame de La Séguinière
- Location of La Séguinière
- Location within France Location within Pays de la Loire
- Coordinates: 47°03′47″N 0°56′17″W
- Country: France
- Region: Pays de la Loire
- Department: Maine-et-Loire
- Arrondissement: Cholet
- Canton: Sèvremoine
- Intercommunality: CA Cholet Agglomération

Government
  - Mayor (2020–2026): Guy Barré
- Area^{1}: 31.48 km^{2} (12.15 sq mi)
- Elevation: 66 m (217 ft)
- Highest elevation: 139 m (456 ft)
- Lowest elevation: 48 m (157 ft)
- Population (2023): 4,248
  - Density: 134.9/km^{2} (349.5/sq mi)
- Time zone: UTC+01:00 (CET)
  - Summer (DST): UTC+02:00 (CEST)
- INSEE/Postal code: 49332 /49280
- ^{1} French Land Register data, which excludes lakes, ponds, glaciers > 1 km^{2} (0.386 sq mi or 247 acres) and river estuaries.

La Séguinière (French pronunciation: [la seɡinjɛʁ]) is a commune in the Maine-et-Loire department in western France.

== Twinning ==
La Séguinière is twinned with Coxheath, Kent, England.

== History ==
From the 5th to the 9th century, the territory was part of ancient Tiphalia, the country of Tiffauges. The first act which mentions the name of La Séguinière mentions around 1080 a Gautier, a priest, who, he and his family, gave the planking of the Elinière near Aubigné to the abbey of Marmoutiers.

During the Middle Ages, an important castle was built to the north of the town, on the right bank of the La Moine river. Burned down, it lay in ruins in the 17th century.

In the 17th century wheat, rye and flax were grown here. The textile industry developing in the Choletais, there are also more than thirty looms. In the 19th century, the inhabitants lived mainly from agriculture, but also from weaving. A laundry, installed in the 18th century, still works there. Several brick and tile kilns are in operation, as well as a dozen water or windmills.

During the War in the Vendée, the inhabitants of the country joined the insurgent troops of Jacques Cathelineau in Cholet. A battle was fought in February 1794 at La Séguinière. The following month the village was burned down and General Cordellier's column massacred the inhabitants.

In the 20th century, in the 1960s, La Séguinière was a small rural town that still lives mainly from agriculture and crafts. A development plan then aims to equip itself with industrial and artisanal zones.

== Population ==
Historical population
Year	Pop.	±% p.a.
1968	1,672	—
1975	2,225	+4.17%
1982	3,108	+4.89%
1990	3,482	+1.43%
1999	3,506	+0.08%
2007	3,636	+0.46%
2012	3,940	+1.62%
2017	4,150	+1.04%
2023	4,248	+0.39%
Source: INSEE

== Notable people ==
- Louis de Montfort, said "the father of Montfort" (1673-1716) came to La Séguinière in 1713 and 1715 where certain stained glass windows of the Notre-Dame de l'Assomption church retrace his life.
- Ron Anderson (basketball, born 1958), former professional basketball player in the NBA and French championships, spent some time with the "La Séguinière Saint-Louis Basket" club.

== See also ==
- Communes of the Maine-et-Loire department
