= Toutlemonde =

- Commune
- Location of Toutlemonde
- Location within France Location within Pays de la Loire
- Coordinates: 47°03′18″N 0°45′54″W
- Country: France
- Region: Pays de la Loire
- Department: Maine-et-Loire
- Arrondissement: Cholet
- Canton: Cholet-2
- Intercommunality: CA Cholet Agglomération

Government
  - Mayor (2020–2026): Gérard Petit
- Area^{1}: 12.9 km^{2} (5.0 sq mi)
- Elevation: 153 m (502 ft)
- Highest elevation: 176 m (577 ft)
- Lowest elevation: 93 m (305 ft)
- Population (2023): 1,305
  - Density: 101/km^{2} (262/sq mi)
- Time zone: UTC+01:00 (CET)
  - Summer (DST): UTC+02:00 (CEST)
- INSEE/Postal code: 49352 /49360
- ^{1} French Land Register data, which excludes lakes, ponds, glaciers > 1 km^{2} (0.386 sq mi or 247 acres) and river estuaries.

Toutlemonde (French pronunciation: [tuləmɔ̃d]) is a commune in the Maine-et-Loire department in western France.

== See also ==
- Communes of the Maine-et-Loire department
