= Lys-Haut-Layon =

- Commune
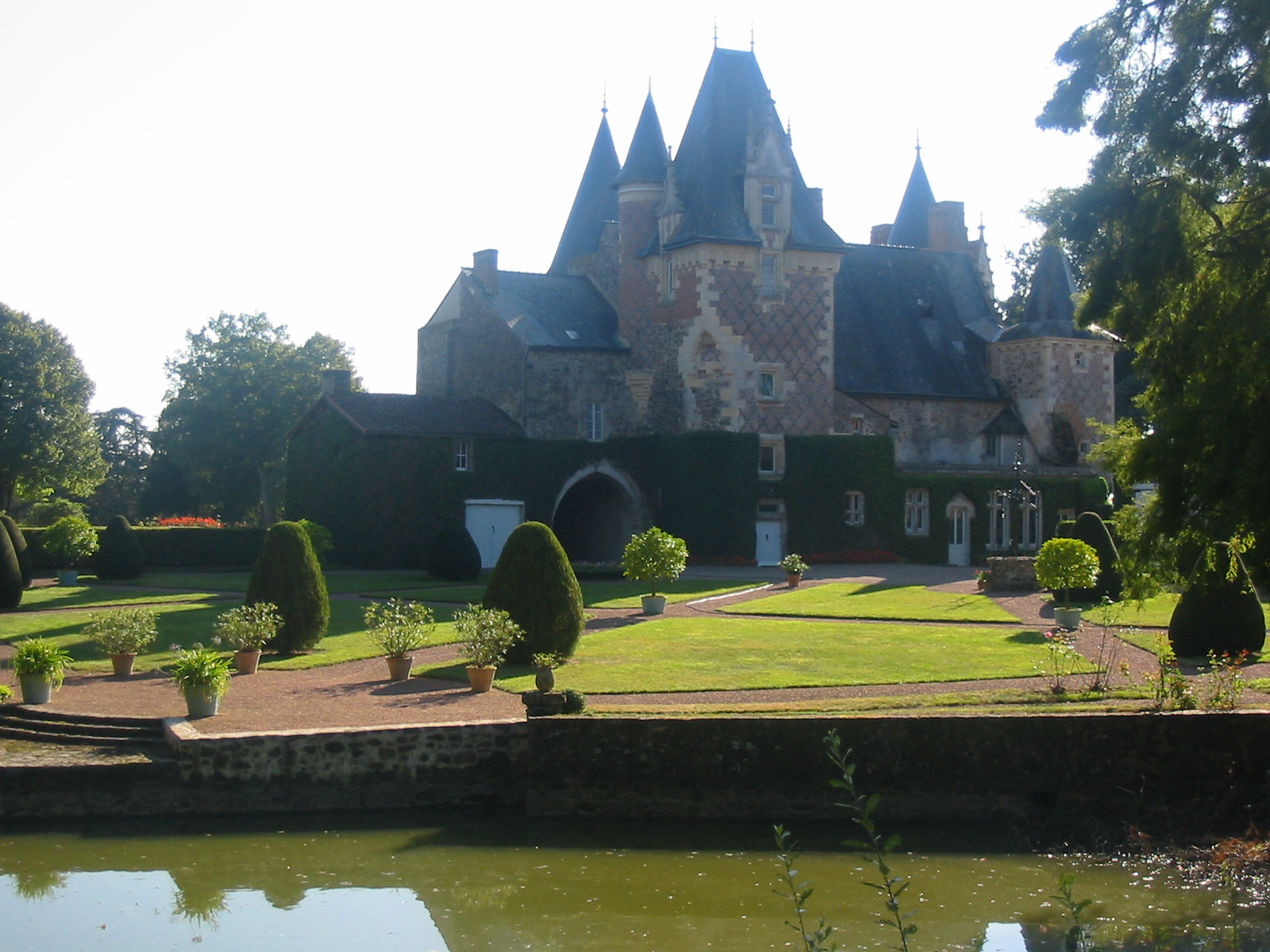
- The Château of the Coudray-Montbault in Vihiers
- Location of Lys-Haut-Layon
- Location within France Location within Pays de la Loire
- Coordinates: 47°08′46″N 0°32′06″W
- Country: France
- Region: Pays de la Loire
- Department: Maine-et-Loire
- Arrondissement: Cholet
- Canton: Cholet-2
- Intercommunality: CA Cholet Agglomération

Government
  - Mayor (2020–2026): Médérick Thomas
- Area^{1}: 178.84 km^{2} (69.05 sq mi)
- Population (2023): 7,748
  - Density: 43.32/km^{2} (112.2/sq mi)
- Time zone: UTC+01:00 (CET)
  - Summer (DST): UTC+02:00 (CEST)
- INSEE/Postal code: 49373 /49310, 49540, 49560
- ^{1} French Land Register data, which excludes lakes, ponds, glaciers > 1 km^{2} (0.386 sq mi or 247 acres) and river estuaries.

Lys-Haut-Layon (French pronunciation: [liso lɛjɔ̃]) is a commune in the Maine-et-Loire department of western France. The municipality was established on 1 January 2016 and consists of the former communes of Vihiers (including Saint-Hilaire-du-Bois and Le Voide), Les Cerqueux-sous-Passavant, La Fosse-de-Tigné, Nueil-sur-Layon, Tancoigné, Tigné and Trémont.

== Population ==
The population data given in the table below refer to the commune in its geography as of January 2025.

Historical population
Year	Pop.	±% p.a.
1968	7,681	—
1975	7,430	−0.47%
1982	7,715	+0.54%
1990	7,532	−0.30%
1999	7,224	−0.46%
2007	7,553	+0.56%
2012	7,877	+0.84%
2017	7,880	+0.01%
2023	7,748	−0.28%
Source: INSEE

== See also ==
- Communes of the Maine-et-Loire department
