= Mazières-en-Mauges =

- Commune
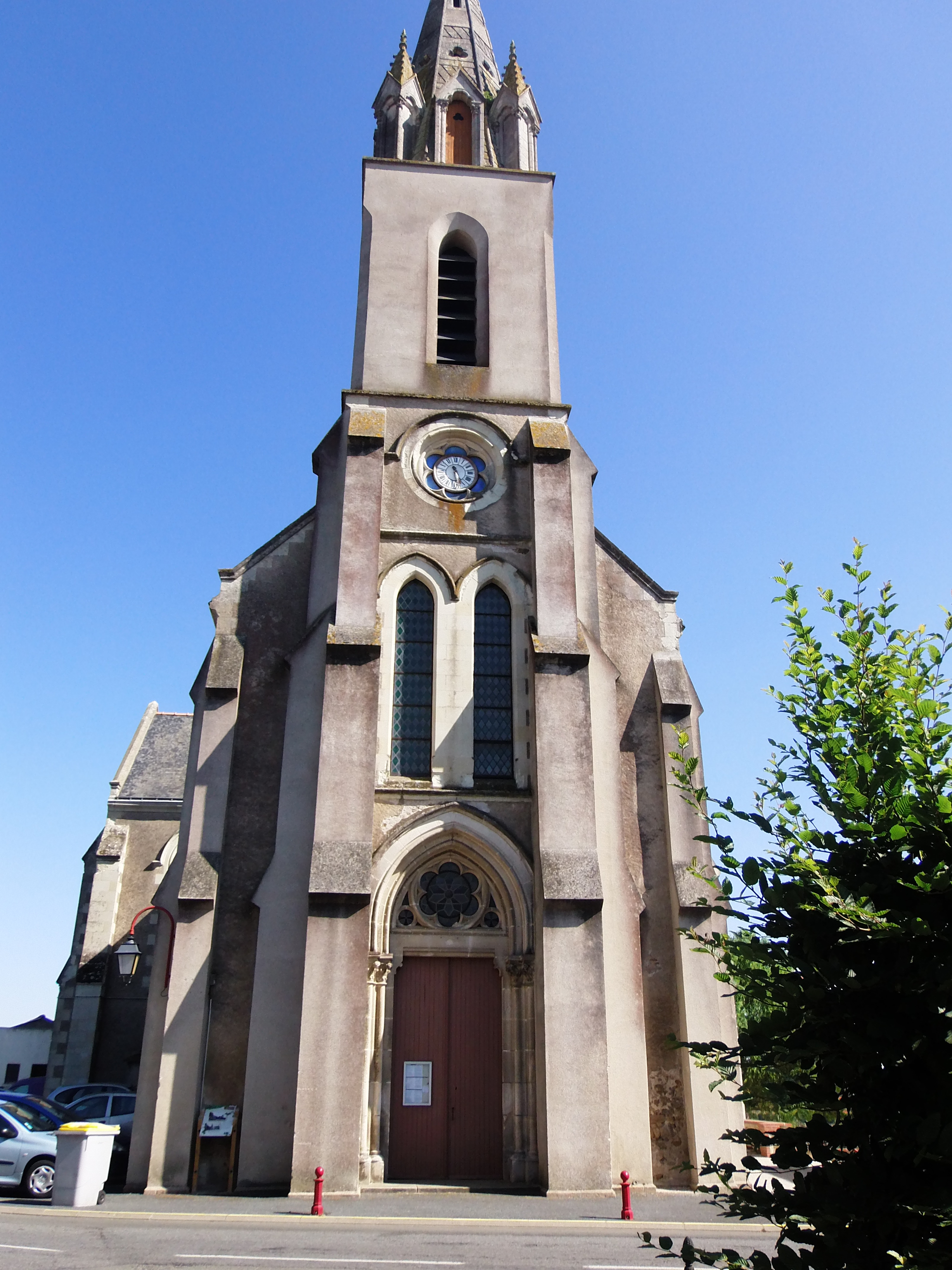
- The church of Saint-Pierre
- Location of Mazières-en-Mauges
- Location within France Location within Pays de la Loire
- Coordinates: 47°02′48″N 0°48′59″W
- Country: France
- Region: Pays de la Loire
- Department: Maine-et-Loire
- Arrondissement: Cholet
- Canton: Cholet-2
- Intercommunality: CA Cholet Agglomération

Government
  - Mayor (2020–2026): Guy Sourisseau
- Area^{1}: 8.86 km^{2} (3.42 sq mi)
- Elevation: 108 m (354 ft)
- Highest elevation: 163 m (535 ft)
- Lowest elevation: 88 m (289 ft)
- Population (2023): 1,240
  - Density: 140/km^{2} (362/sq mi)
- Demonym(s): Maziérais, Maziéraise
- Time zone: UTC+01:00 (CET)
  - Summer (DST): UTC+02:00 (CEST)
- INSEE/Postal code: 49195 /49280
- ^{1} French Land Register data, which excludes lakes, ponds, glaciers > 1 km^{2} (0.386 sq mi or 247 acres) and river estuaries.

Mazières-en-Mauges (French pronunciation: [mazjɛʁ ɑ̃ moʒ]) is a commune in the Maine-et-Loire department in western France.

== See also ==
- Communes of the Maine-et-Loire department
