= Saint Michael's Church, Le May-sur-Èvre =

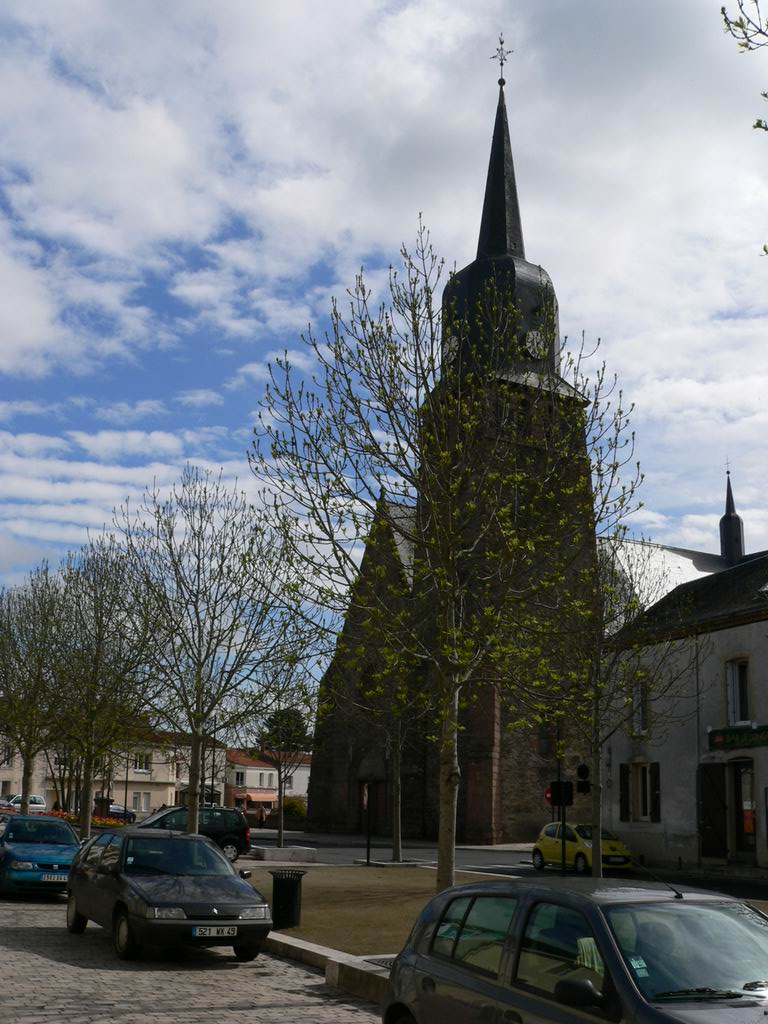
Saint Michael's Church in le May-sur-Èvre

Saint-Michael's Church of le May-sur-Èvre is located in les Mauges, area of the West of France, (Maine-et-Loire). Often named "the Giant of the Mauges" (French: "le Géant des Mauges") because of its great size, it is the most remarkable building of the town.

== History ==
The church was built in the 15th century on the location of a previous priory chapel. Its walls, supported by large granite buttresses and its heavy steeple give the church of Saint-Michel a robust aspect, typical of the Ancien Régime time in les Mauges. After the War in the Vendée (1793 to 1796; French: "Guerre de Vendée"), it is one of the only religious building left in the 19th century. Since 1973, it has been inscribed on the list of historical monuments of regional importance, (French: "inscription au titre des monuments historiques" formerly called "Inventaire Supplémentaire des Monuments Historiques").

== Saint-Michael killing the dragon ==
A statue of Saint-Michael killing the dragon can be seen in the church which is the work of the sculptor Pierre Biardeau, (1608–1671). Apart for the wings and the cross, the statue is made in only one piece of baked clay.

== Notes ==
47°08′15″N 0°53′31″W
