= Chanteloup-les-Bois =

- Commune
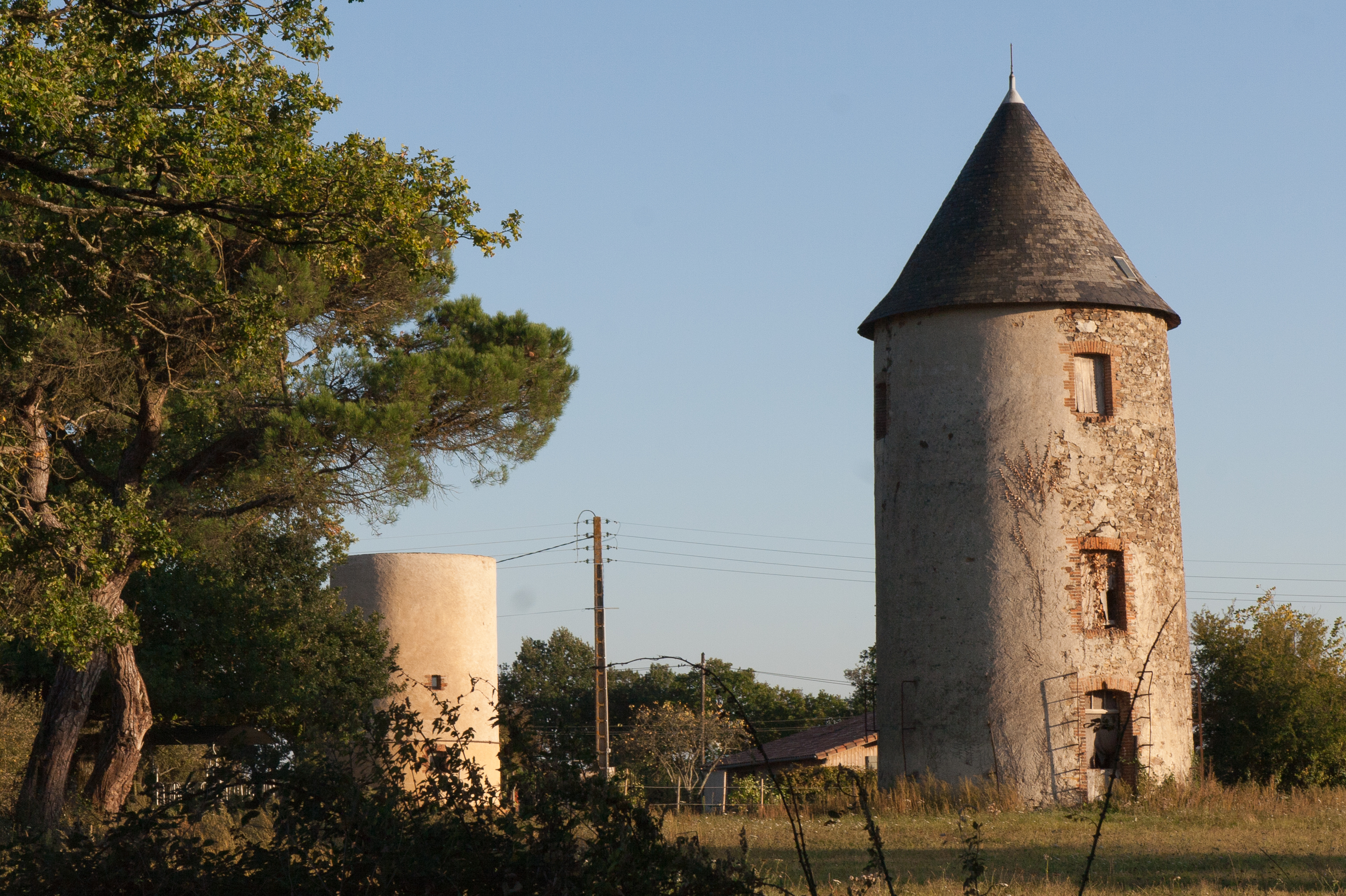
- The Mills of Péronne

- Coat of arms
- Location of Chanteloup-les-Bois
- Location within France Location within Pays de la Loire
- Coordinates: 47°05′44″N 0°41′03″W
- Country: France
- Region: Pays de la Loire
- Department: Maine-et-Loire
- Arrondissement: Cholet
- Canton: Cholet-2
- Intercommunality: CA Cholet Agglomération

Government
  - Mayor (2020–2026): Olivier Rio
- Area^{1}: 27.47 km^{2} (10.61 sq mi)
- Elevation: 175 m (574 ft)
- Highest elevation: 191 m (627 ft)
- Lowest elevation: 128 m (420 ft)
- Population (2023): 734
  - Density: 26.7/km^{2} (69.2/sq mi)
- Demonym(s): Cantelupien, Cantelupienne
- Time zone: UTC+01:00 (CET)
  - Summer (DST): UTC+02:00 (CEST)
- INSEE/Postal code: 49070 /49340
- ^{1} French Land Register data, which excludes lakes, ponds, glaciers > 1 km^{2} (0.386 sq mi or 247 acres) and river estuaries.

Chanteloup-les-Bois (French pronunciation: [ʃɑ̃tlu le bwa]) is a commune in the Maine-et-Loire department of western France.

== See also ==
- Communes of the Maine-et-Loire department
- Mauges-sur-Loire
