= Trémentines =

- Commune
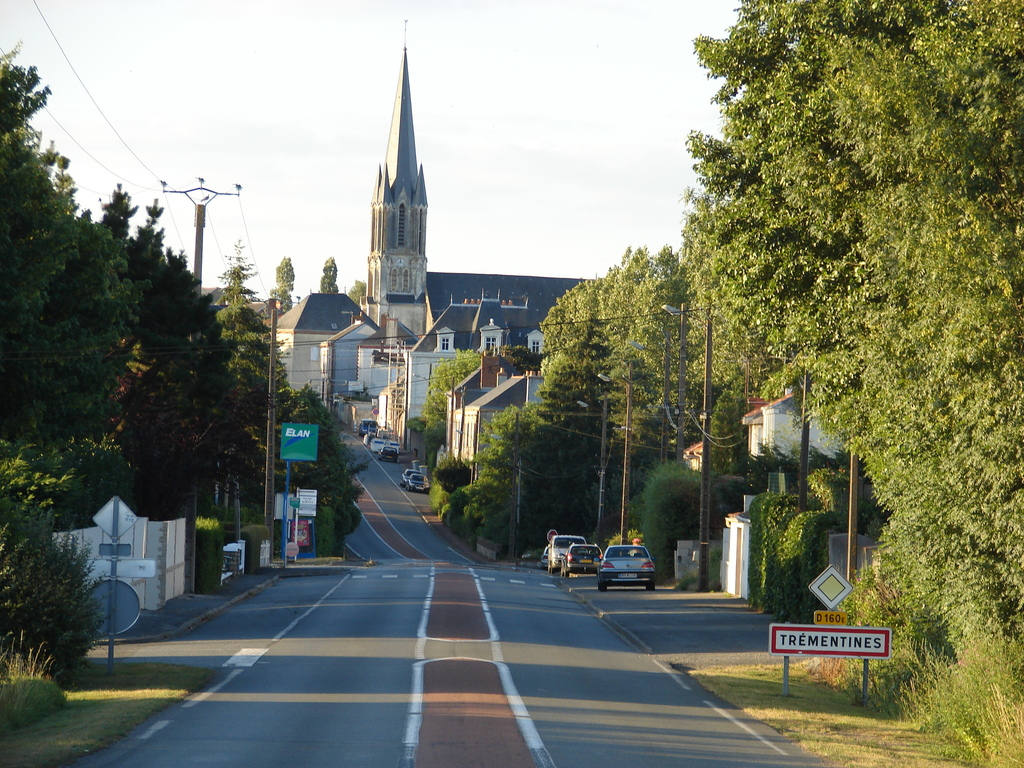
- The rue Pasteur in Trémentines
- Location of Trémentines
- Location within France Location within Pays de la Loire
- Coordinates: 47°07′23″N 0°47′06″W
- Country: France
- Region: Pays de la Loire
- Department: Maine-et-Loire
- Arrondissement: Cholet
- Canton: Cholet-2
- Intercommunality: CA Cholet Agglomération

Government
  - Mayor (2020–2026): Jacqueline Delaunay
- Area^{1}: 34.83 km^{2} (13.45 sq mi)
- Elevation: 127 m (417 ft)
- Highest elevation: 180 m (590 ft)
- Lowest elevation: 82 m (269 ft)
- Population (2023): 3,101
  - Density: 89.03/km^{2} (230.6/sq mi)
- Time zone: UTC+01:00 (CET)
  - Summer (DST): UTC+02:00 (CEST)
- INSEE/Postal code: 49355 /49340
- ^{1} French Land Register data, which excludes lakes, ponds, glaciers > 1 km^{2} (0.386 sq mi or 247 acres) and river estuaries.

Trémentines (French pronunciation: [tʁemɑ̃tin]) is a commune in the Maine-et-Loire department in western France. The musicologist Jean-Pierre Ouvrard (1948–1992) was born in Trémentines.

== Geography ==
The commune is traversed by the Èvre river.

== Population ==
Historical population
Year	Pop.	±% p.a.
1968	2,037	—
1975	2,341	+2.01%
1982	2,805	+2.62%
1990	3,034	+0.99%
1999	2,817	−0.82%
2007	2,865	+0.21%
2012	2,793	−0.51%
2017	3,005	+1.47%
2023	3,101	+0.53%
Source: INSEE

== See also ==
- Communes of the Maine-et-Loire department
