= Vezins, Maine-et-Loire =

Vezins
- Commune
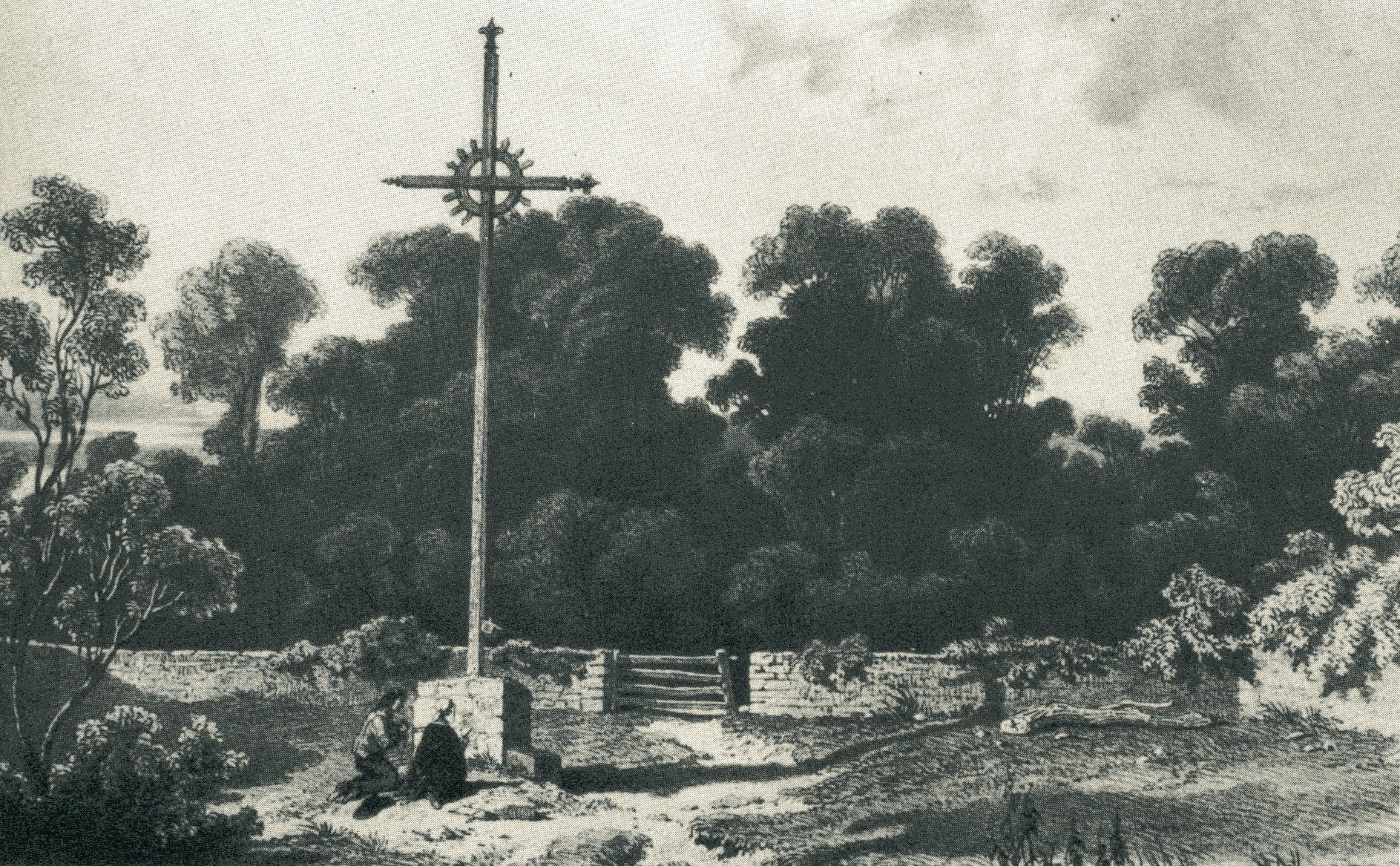
- The cemetery of the martyrs of the battle of Ouleries
- Location of Vezins
- Location within France Location within Pays de la Loire
- Coordinates: 47°07′15″N 0°42′37″W
- Country: France
- Region: Pays de la Loire
- Department: Maine-et-Loire
- Arrondissement: Cholet
- Canton: Cholet-2
- Intercommunality: CA Cholet Agglomération

Government
  - Mayor (2020–2026): Cédric Van Vooren
- Area^{1}: 18.36 km^{2} (7.09 sq mi)
- Elevation: 140 m (460 ft)
- Highest elevation: 184 m (604 ft)
- Lowest elevation: 113 m (371 ft)
- Population (2023): 1,758
  - Density: 95.75/km^{2} (248.0/sq mi)
- Time zone: UTC+01:00 (CET)
  - Summer (DST): UTC+02:00 (CEST)
- INSEE/Postal code: 49371 /49340
- ^{1} French Land Register data, which excludes lakes, ponds, glaciers > 1 km^{2} (0.386 sq mi or 247 acres) and river estuaries.

Vezins (French pronunciation: [vəzɛ̃]) is a commune in the Maine-et-Loire department in western France.

== Geography ==
The Èvre river has its source in the commune, 1.5 km north east from the village itself.

== Demography ==
Historical population
Year	Pop.	±% p.a.
1968	1,044	—
1975	1,073	+0.39%
1982	1,265	+2.38%
1990	1,394	+1.22%
1999	1,582	+1.42%
2007	1,642	+0.47%
2012	1,609	−0.41%
2017	1,717	+1.31%
2023	1,758	+0.39%
Source: INSEE

== See also ==
- Communes of the Maine-et-Loire department
