= La Romagne, Maine-et-Loire =

La Romagne
- Commune
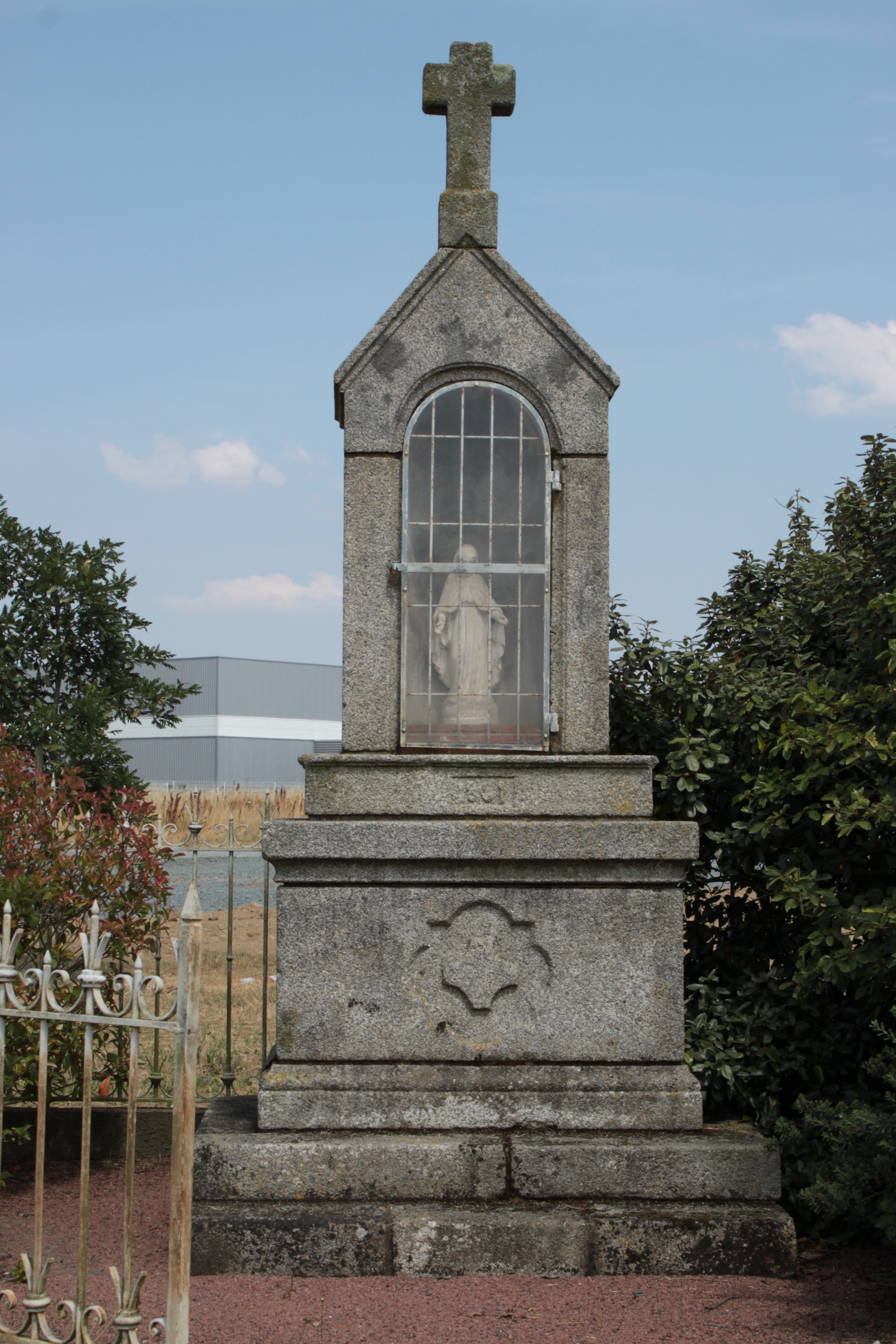
- The Oratoire de la Peltière
- Location of La Romagne
- Location within France Location within Pays de la Loire
- Coordinates: 47°03′42″N 1°01′15″W
- Country: France
- Region: Pays de la Loire
- Department: Maine-et-Loire
- Arrondissement: Cholet
- Canton: Sèvremoine
- Intercommunality: CA Cholet Agglomération

Government
  - Mayor (2020–2026): Josette Guitton
- Area^{1}: 16.11 km^{2} (6.22 sq mi)
- Elevation: 110 m (360 ft)
- Population (2023): 2,028
  - Density: 125.9/km^{2} (326.0/sq mi)
- Demonym(s): Romagnon, Romagnonne
- Time zone: UTC+01:00 (CET)
  - Summer (DST): UTC+02:00 (CEST)
- INSEE/Postal code: 49260 /49740
- ^{1} French Land Register data, which excludes lakes, ponds, glaciers > 1 km^{2} (0.386 sq mi or 247 acres) and river estuaries.

La Romagne (French pronunciation: [la ʁɔmaɲ]) is a commune in the Maine-et-Loire department in western France.

== Population ==
Historical population
Year	Pop.	±% p.a.
1968	1,048	—
1975	1,182	+1.73%
1982	1,434	+2.80%
1990	1,603	+1.40%
1999	1,587	−0.11%
2007	1,673	+0.66%
2012	1,774	+1.18%
2017	1,879	+1.16%
2023	2,028	+1.28%
Source: INSEE

== See also ==
- Communes of the Maine-et-Loire department
