= Bégrolles-en-Mauges =

- Commune
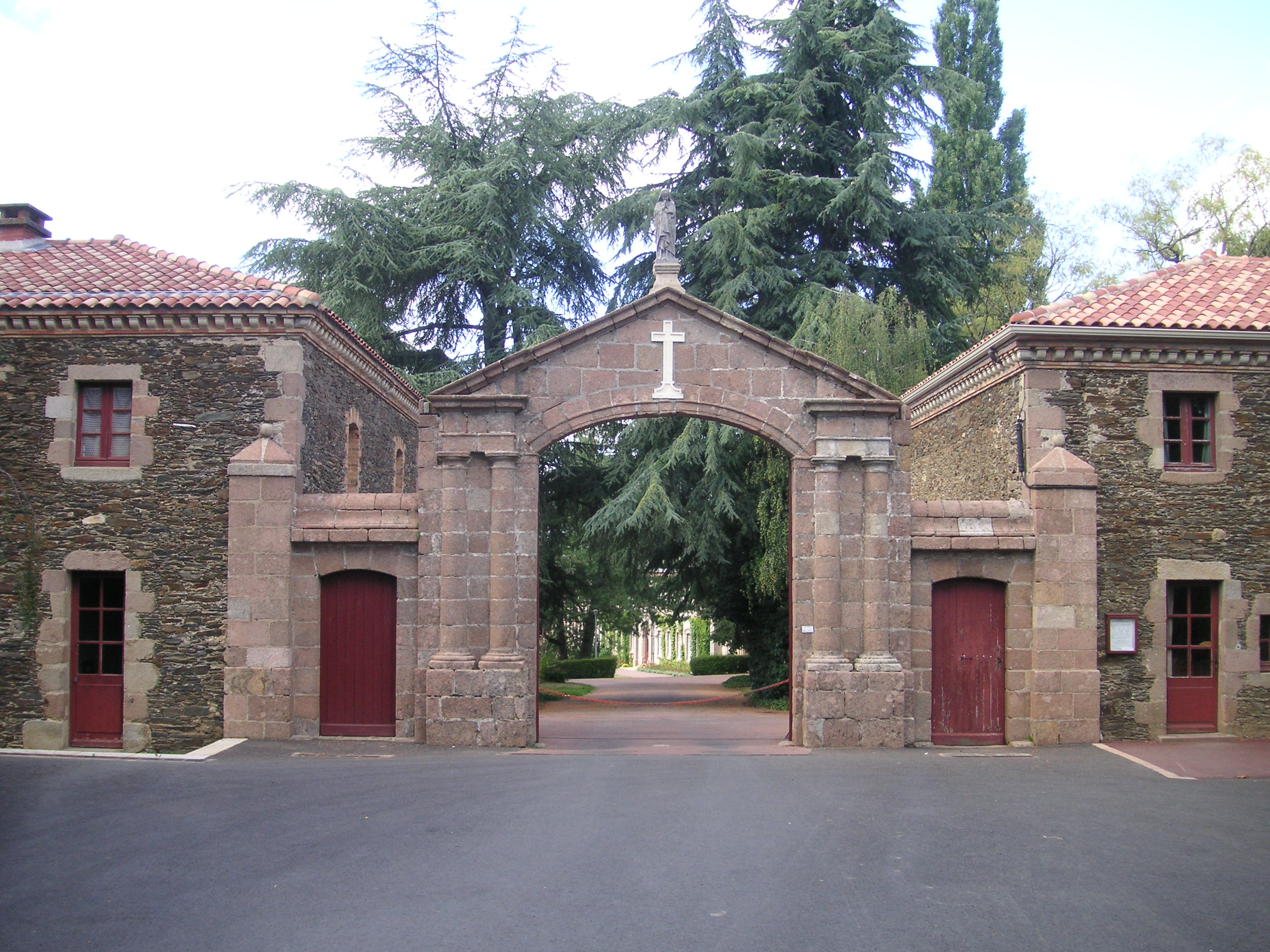
- The main entrance to Bellefontaine Abbey

- Coat of arms
- Location of Bégrolles-en-Mauges
- Location within France Location within Pays de la Loire
- Coordinates: 47°08′29″N 0°56′25″W
- Country: France
- Region: Pays de la Loire
- Department: Maine-et-Loire
- Arrondissement: Cholet
- Canton: Beaupréau-en-Mauges
- Intercommunality: CA Cholet Agglomération

Government
  - Mayor (2020–2026): Pierre-Marie Cailleau
- Area^{1}: 14.69 km^{2} (5.67 sq mi)
- Elevation: 118 m (387 ft)
- Highest elevation: 117 m (384 ft)
- Lowest elevation: 74 m (243 ft)
- Population (2023): 2,110
  - Density: 144/km^{2} (372/sq mi)
- Time zone: UTC+01:00 (CET)
  - Summer (DST): UTC+02:00 (CEST)
- INSEE/Postal code: 49027 /49122
- ^{1} French Land Register data, which excludes lakes, ponds, glaciers > 1 km^{2} (0.386 sq mi or 247 acres) and river estuaries.

Bégrolles-en-Mauges (French pronunciation: [beɡʁɔl ɑ̃ moʒ]) is a commune in the Maine-et-Loire department in western France.

== Population ==
Historical population

Year	Pop.	±% p.a.
1851	1,044	—
1872	1,277	+0.96%
1901	1,000	−0.84%
1926	844	−0.68%
1946	976	+0.73%
1962	1,104	+0.77%
1968	1,146	+0.62%
1975	1,254	+1.29%

Year	Pop.	±% p.a.
1982	1,435	+1.94%
1990	1,520	+0.72%
1999	1,531	+0.08%
2007	1,749	+1.68%
2012	1,976	+2.47%
2017	2,068	+0.91%
2023	2,110	+0.34%

Source: EHESS and INSEE (1968-2023)

== See also ==
- Communes of the Maine-et-Loire department
