= Maulévrier =

- Commune
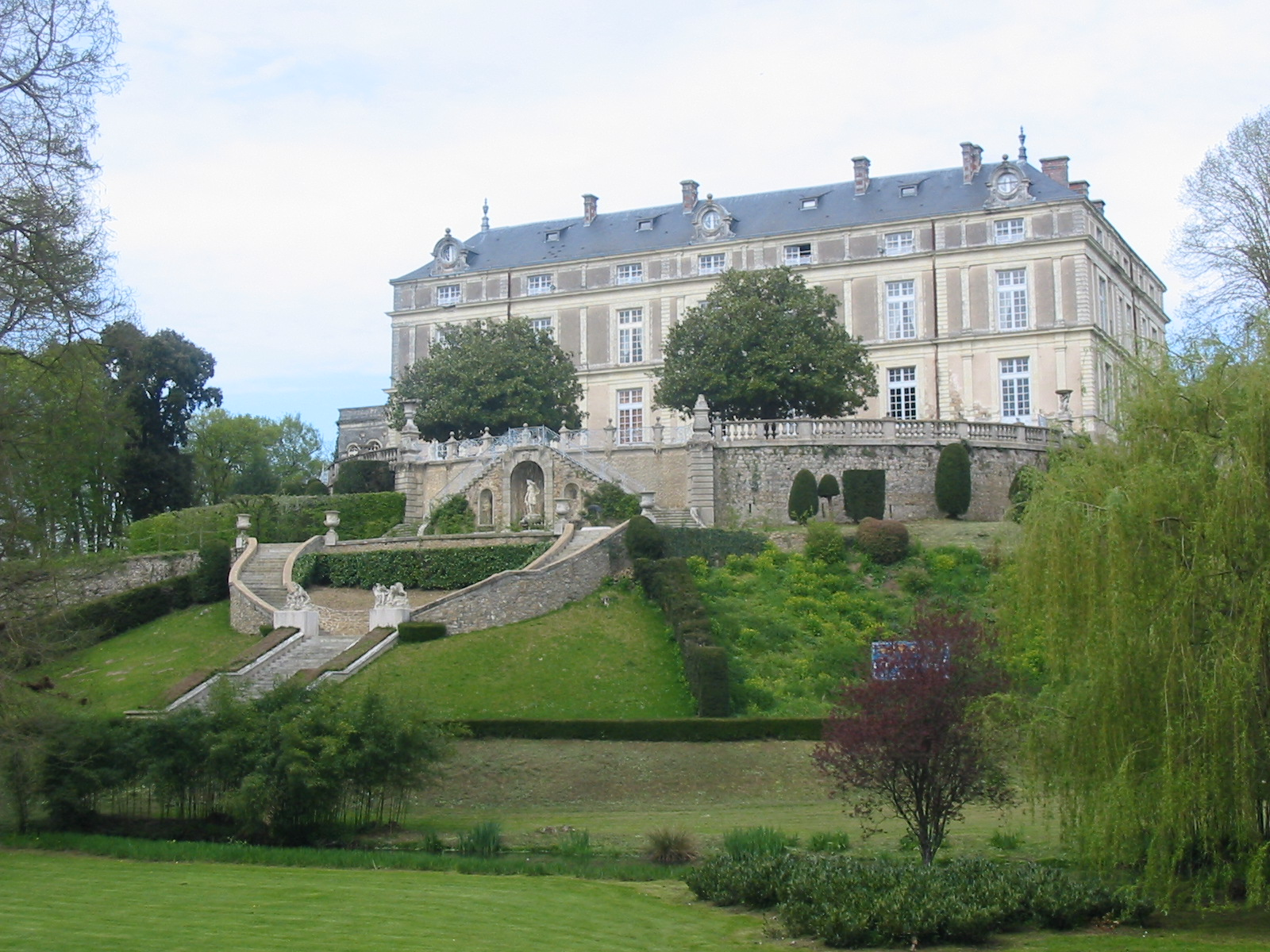
- The Chateau Colbert in Maulévrier

- Coat of arms
- Location of Maulévrier
- Location within France Location within Pays de la Loire
- Coordinates: 47°00′36″N 0°44′38″W
- Country: France
- Region: Pays de la Loire
- Department: Maine-et-Loire
- Arrondissement: Cholet
- Canton: Cholet-2
- Intercommunality: CA Cholet Agglomération

Government
  - Mayor (2020–2026): Dominique Hervé
- Area^{1}: 33.63 km^{2} (12.98 sq mi)
- Elevation: 110 m (360 ft)
- Highest elevation: 176 m (577 ft)
- Lowest elevation: 87 m (285 ft)
- Population (2023): 3,172
  - Density: 94.32/km^{2} (244.3/sq mi)
- Demonym(s): Maulévrais, Maulévraise
- Time zone: UTC+01:00 (CET)
  - Summer (DST): UTC+02:00 (CEST)
- INSEE/Postal code: 49192 /49360
- Website: maulevrier.fr
- ^{1} French Land Register data, which excludes lakes, ponds, glaciers > 1 km^{2} (0.386 sq mi or 247 acres) and river estuaries.

Maulévrier (French pronunciation: [molevʁije]) is a commune in the department of Maine-et-Loire, Pays de la Loire, western France.

== Population ==
Historical population
Year	Pop.	±% p.a.
1968	1,670	—
1975	1,838	+1.38%
1982	2,330	+3.45%
1990	2,610	+1.43%
1999	2,830	+0.90%
2007	2,951	+0.52%
2012	3,210	+1.70%
2017	3,176	−0.21%
2023	3,172	−0.02%
Source: INSEE

== Points of interest ==
- Parc Oriental de Maulévrier – the biggest Japanese garden in France

== See also ==
- Communes of the Maine-et-Loire department
