= La Plaine, Maine-et-Loire =

La Plaine
- Commune
- Location of La Plaine
- Location within France Location within Pays de la Loire
- Coordinates: 47°04′08″N 0°38′02″W
- Country: France
- Region: Pays de la Loire
- Department: Maine-et-Loire
- Arrondissement: Cholet
- Canton: Cholet-2
- Intercommunality: CA Cholet Agglomération

Government
  - Mayor (2020–2026): Sylvie Barbault
- Area^{1}: 22.24 km^{2} (8.59 sq mi)
- Highest elevation: 213 m (699 ft)
- Lowest elevation: 124 m (407 ft)
- Population (2023): 1,018
  - Density: 45.77/km^{2} (118.6/sq mi)
- Demonym(s): Plainais, Plainaise
- Time zone: UTC+01:00 (CET)
  - Summer (DST): UTC+02:00 (CEST)
- INSEE/Postal code: 49240 /49360
- ^{1} French Land Register data, which excludes lakes, ponds, glaciers > 1 km^{2} (0.386 sq mi or 247 acres) and river estuaries.

La Plaine (French pronunciation: [la plɛn]) is a commune in the Maine-et-Loire department in western France.

== See also ==
- Communes of the Maine-et-Loire department
