= Somloire =

- Commune
- Location of Somloire
- Location within France Location within Pays de la Loire
- Coordinates: 47°02′05″N 0°36′18″W
- Country: France
- Region: Pays de la Loire
- Department: Maine-et-Loire
- Arrondissement: Cholet
- Canton: Cholet-2
- Intercommunality: CA Cholet Agglomération

Government
  - Mayor (2020–2026): Sébastien Crétin
- Area^{1}: 31.83 km^{2} (12.29 sq mi)
- Highest elevation: 184 m (604 ft)
- Lowest elevation: 107 m (351 ft)
- Population (2023): 884
  - Density: 27.8/km^{2} (71.9/sq mi)
- Time zone: UTC+01:00 (CET)
  - Summer (DST): UTC+02:00 (CEST)
- INSEE/Postal code: 49336 /49360
- ^{1} French Land Register data, which excludes lakes, ponds, glaciers > 1 km^{2} (0.386 sq mi or 247 acres) and river estuaries.

Somloire (French pronunciation: [sɔmlwaʁ]) is a commune in the Maine-et-Loire department in western France. It is around 20 km east of Cholet.

== See also ==
- Communes of the Maine-et-Loire department
