= La Tessoualle =

- Commune
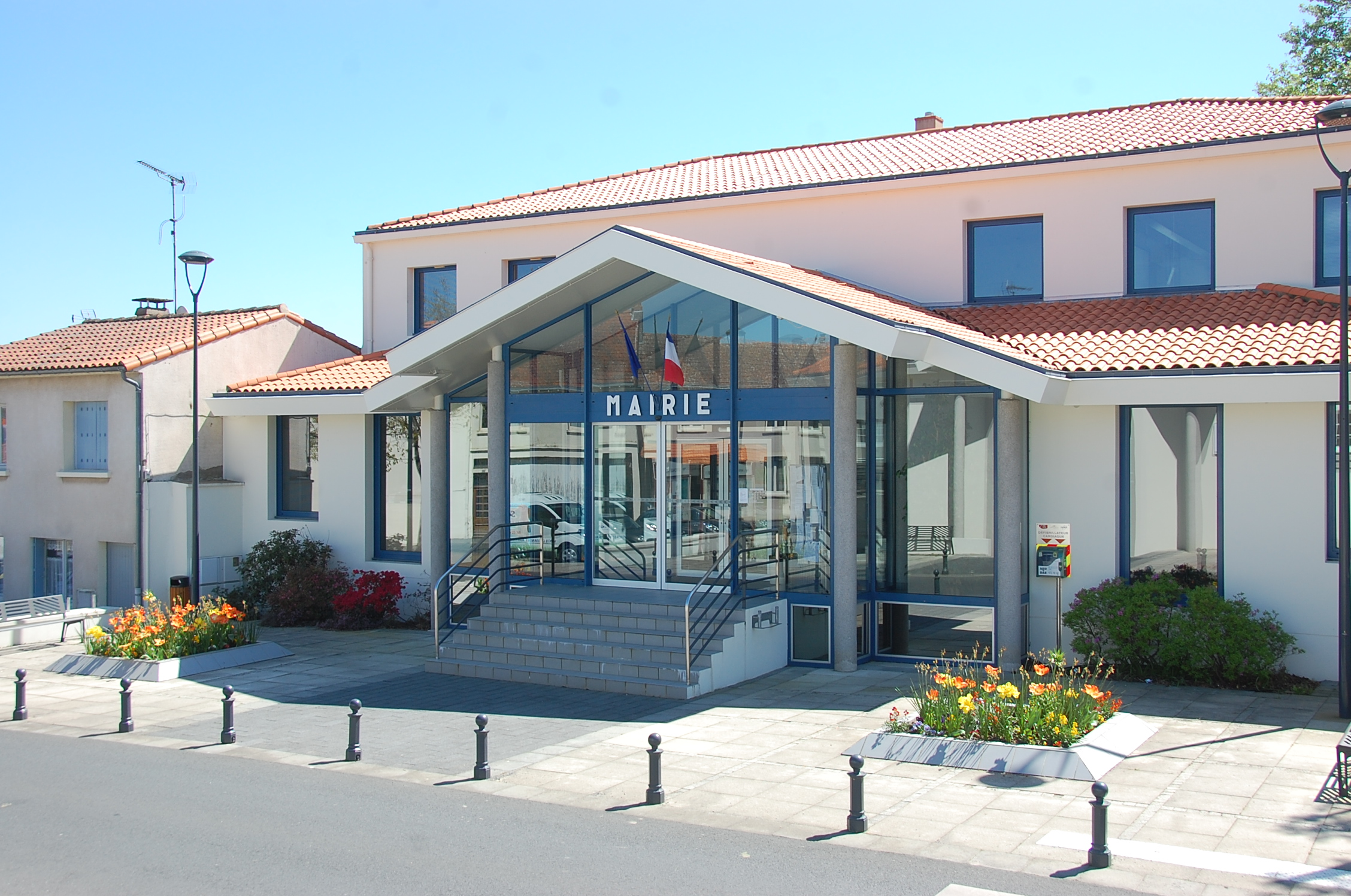
- The town hall of La Tessoualle
- Location of La Tessoualle
- Location within France Location within Pays de la Loire
- Coordinates: 47°00′18″N 0°50′56″W
- Country: France
- Region: Pays de la Loire
- Department: Maine-et-Loire
- Arrondissement: Cholet
- Canton: Cholet-2
- Intercommunality: CA Cholet Agglomération

Government
  - Mayor (2020–2026): Dominique Landreau
- Area^{1}: 21.21 km^{2} (8.19 sq mi)
- Elevation: 144 m (472 ft)
- Highest elevation: 164 m (538 ft)
- Lowest elevation: 72 m (236 ft)
- Population (2023): 3,167
  - Density: 149.3/km^{2} (386.7/sq mi)
- Time zone: UTC+01:00 (CET)
  - Summer (DST): UTC+02:00 (CEST)
- INSEE/Postal code: 49343 /49280
- ^{1} French Land Register data, which excludes lakes, ponds, glaciers > 1 km^{2} (0.386 sq mi or 247 acres) and river estuaries.

La Tessoualle (French pronunciation: [la teswal]) is a commune in the department of Maine-et-Loire, western France.

== Population ==
Historical population
Year	Pop.	±% p.a.
1968	1,648	—
1975	2,052	+3.18%
1982	2,677	+3.87%
1990	2,781	+0.48%
1999	2,941	+0.62%
2007	3,032	+0.38%
2012	3,092	+0.39%
2017	3,198	+0.68%
2023	3,167	−0.16%
Source: INSEE

== See also ==
- Communes of the Maine-et-Loire department
