= Montilliers =

- Commune
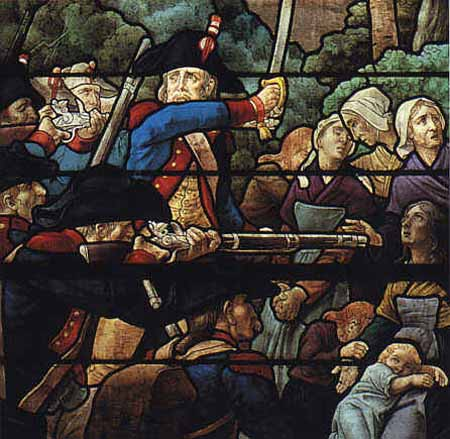
- A stained glass window in the Church of Saint-Hillaire of Montilliers, presenting the massacre of Moulin-de-la-Reine on 5 April 1794

- Coat of arms
- Location of Montilliers
- Location within France Location within Pays de la Loire
- Coordinates: 47°11′01″N 0°30′12″W
- Country: France
- Region: Pays de la Loire
- Department: Maine-et-Loire
- Arrondissement: Cholet
- Canton: Cholet-2
- Intercommunality: CA Cholet Agglomération

Government
  - Mayor (2020–2026): Philippe Bernard
- Area^{1}: 26.36 km^{2} (10.18 sq mi)
- Elevation: 100 m (330 ft)
- Highest elevation: 119 m (390 ft)
- Lowest elevation: 42 m (138 ft)
- Population (2023): 1,222
  - Density: 46.36/km^{2} (120.1/sq mi)
- Demonym(s): Monteglésien, Monteglésienne
- Time zone: UTC+01:00 (CET)
  - Summer (DST): UTC+02:00 (CEST)
- INSEE/Postal code: 49211 /49310
- Website: Site officiel de Montilliers
- ^{1} French Land Register data, which excludes lakes, ponds, glaciers > 1 km^{2} (0.386 sq mi or 247 acres) and river estuaries.

Montilliers (French pronunciation: [mɔ̃tije]) is a commune in the Maine-et-Loire department in western France.

== See also ==
- Communes of the Maine-et-Loire department
