= Cléré-sur-Layon =

- Commune
- Location of Cléré-sur-Layon
- Location within France Location within Pays de la Loire
- Coordinates: 47°05′37″N 0°25′11″W
- Country: France
- Region: Pays de la Loire
- Department: Maine-et-Loire
- Arrondissement: Cholet
- Canton: Cholet-2
- Intercommunality: CA Cholet Agglomération

Government
  - Mayor (2020–2026): Serge Lefevre
- Area^{1}: 21.74 km^{2} (8.39 sq mi)
- Elevation: 99 m (325 ft)
- Highest elevation: 116 m (381 ft)
- Lowest elevation: 67 m (220 ft)
- Population (2023): 348
  - Density: 16.0/km^{2} (41.5/sq mi)
- Demonym(s): Cléréen, Cléréenne
- Time zone: UTC+01:00 (CET)
  - Summer (DST): UTC+02:00 (CEST)
- INSEE/Postal code: 49102 /49560
- ^{1} French Land Register data, which excludes lakes, ponds, glaciers > 1 km^{2} (0.386 sq mi or 247 acres) and river estuaries.

Cléré-sur-Layon (French pronunciation: [kleʁe syʁ lɛjɔ̃], literally Cléré on Layon) is a commune in the Maine-et-Loire department in western France.

== Geography ==
The village lies on the right bank of the Layon, which flows northeastward through the commune.

== See also ==
- Communes of the Maine-et-Loire department
