= Coron, Maine-et-Loire =

Coron
- Commune
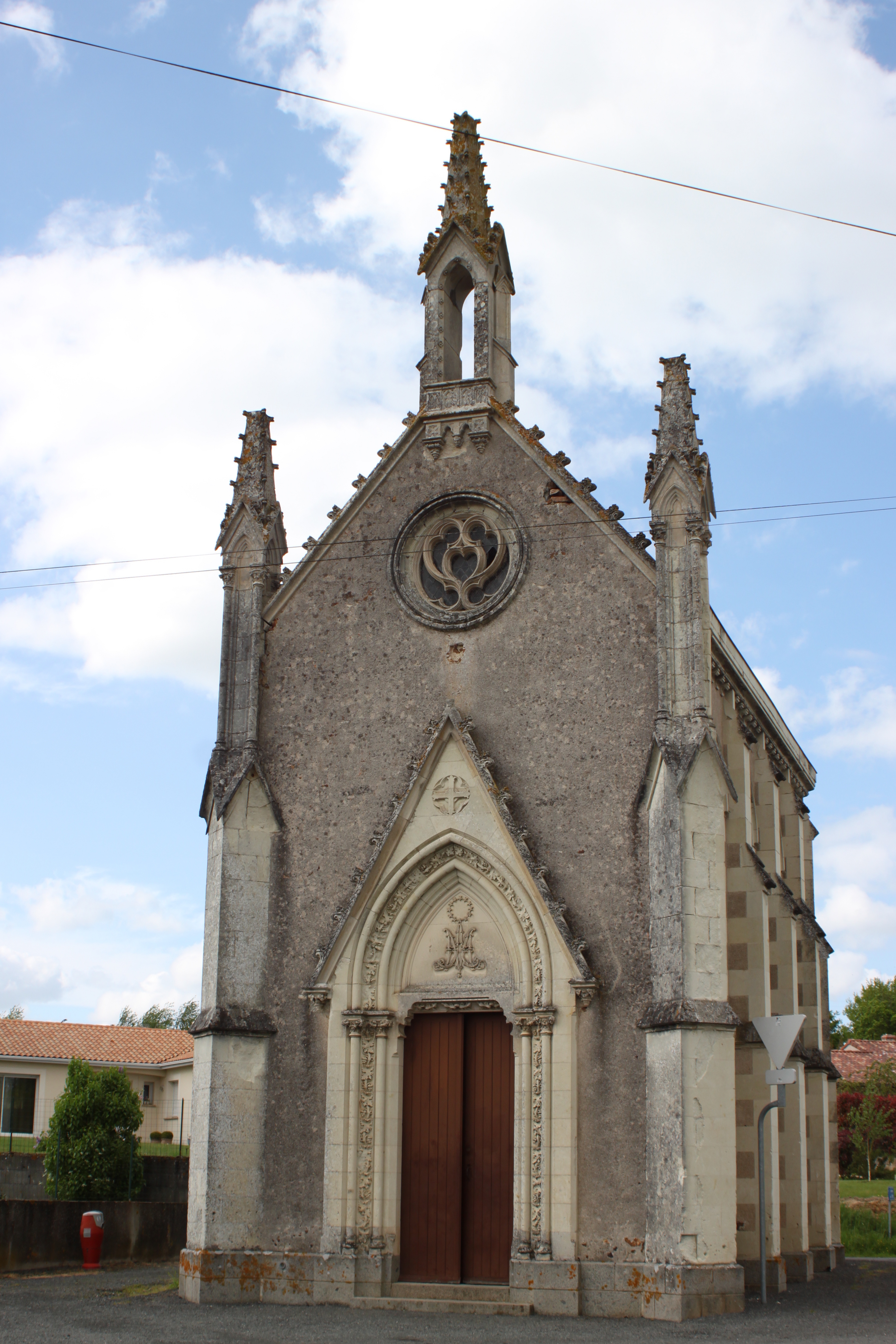
- The chapel of Vertu

- Coat of arms
- Location of Coron
- Location within France Location within Pays de la Loire
- Coordinates: 47°07′42″N 0°38′35″W
- Country: France
- Region: Pays de la Loire
- Department: Maine-et-Loire
- Arrondissement: Cholet
- Canton: Cholet-2
- Intercommunality: CA Cholet Agglomération

Government
  - Mayor (2020–2026): Xavier Testard
- Area^{1}: 31.9 km^{2} (12.3 sq mi)
- Elevation: 131 m (430 ft)
- Highest elevation: 188 m (617 ft)
- Lowest elevation: 84 m (276 ft)
- Population (2023): 1,603
  - Density: 50.3/km^{2} (130/sq mi)
- Demonym(s): Coronnais, Coronnaise
- Time zone: UTC+01:00 (CET)
  - Summer (DST): UTC+02:00 (CEST)
- INSEE/Postal code: 49109 /49690
- ^{1} French Land Register data, which excludes lakes, ponds, glaciers > 1 km^{2} (0.386 sq mi or 247 acres) and river estuaries.

Coron (French pronunciation: [kɔʁɔ̃]) is a commune in the Maine-et-Loire department in western France.

== See also ==
- Communes of the Maine-et-Loire department
