= Les Cerqueux =

- Commune
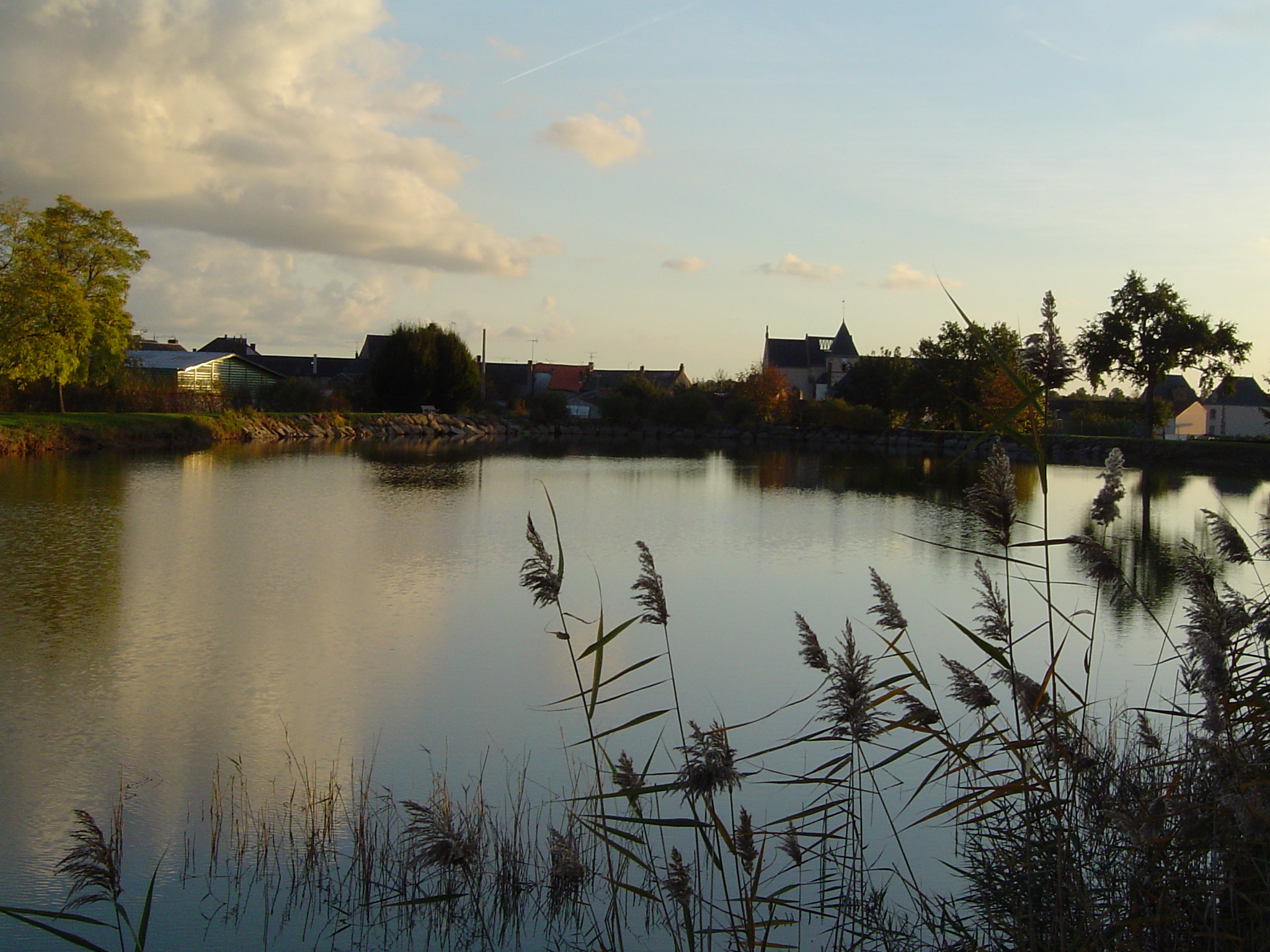
- The lake in Les Cerqueux
- Location of Les Cerqueux
- Location within France Location within Pays de la Loire
- Coordinates: 47°00′03″N 0°38′21″W
- Country: France
- Region: Pays de la Loire
- Department: Maine-et-Loire
- Arrondissement: Cholet
- Canton: Cholet-2
- Intercommunality: CA Cholet Agglomération

Government
  - Mayor (2020–2026): Joël Poupard
- Area^{1}: 13.82 km^{2} (5.34 sq mi)
- Elevation: 150 m (490 ft)
- Highest elevation: 186 m (610 ft)
- Lowest elevation: 139 m (456 ft)
- Population (2023): 897
  - Density: 64.9/km^{2} (168/sq mi)
- Demonym(s): Cerquois, Cerquoise
- Time zone: UTC+01:00 (CET)
  - Summer (DST): UTC+02:00 (CEST)
- INSEE/Postal code: 49058 /49360
- ^{1} French Land Register data, which excludes lakes, ponds, glaciers > 1 km^{2} (0.386 sq mi or 247 acres) and river estuaries.

Les Cerqueux (French pronunciation: [le sɛʁkø], before 1996: Les Cerqueux-de-Maulevrier) is a commune in the Maine-et-Loire department, western France.

== See also ==
- Communes of the Maine-et-Loire department
