= Cholet Agglomération =

Coordinates: 47°3′N 0°54′W

- Communauté d'agglomération
- Location within the Maine-et-Loire department
- Country: France
- Region: Pays de la Loire
- Department: Maine-et-Loire
- No. of communes: {{{nbcomm}}}
- Established: January 2017

Government
  - President: Gilles Bourdouleix (Ind.)
- Area: 788 km^{2} (304 sq mi)
- Population (2018): 104,382
  - Density: 132/km^{2} (343/sq mi)
- Website: CAC Website

Cholet Agglomération (before August 2023: Agglomération du Choletais) is the intercommunal structure gathering the city of Cholet and its suburbs.

It is located in the Maine-et-Loire département, in the Pays de la Loire région (France). It was formed on 1 January 2017 by the merger of the former Communauté d'agglomération du Choletais, the Communauté de communes du Bocage and the Communauté de communes du Vihiersois-Haut-Layon. Its area is 788.0 km^{2}. Its population was 104,382 in 2018, of which 54,186 in Cholet proper.

== Composition ==
Cholet Agglomération gathers the following 26 communes:

1. Bégrolles-en-Mauges
2. Cernusson
3. Les Cerqueux
4. Chanteloup-les-Bois
5. Cholet
6. Cléré-sur-Layon
7. Coron
8. Lys-Haut-Layon
9. Maulévrier
10. Le May-sur-Èvre
11. Mazières-en-Mauges
12. Montilliers
13. Nuaillé
14. Passavant-sur-Layon
15. La Plaine
16. La Romagne
17. Saint-Christophe-du-Bois
18. Saint-Léger-sous-Cholet
19. Saint-Paul-du-Bois
20. La Séguinière
21. Somloire
22. La Tessoualle
23. Toutlemonde
24. Trémentines
25. Vezins
26. Yzernay
