= Saint-Christophe-du-Bois =

- Commune
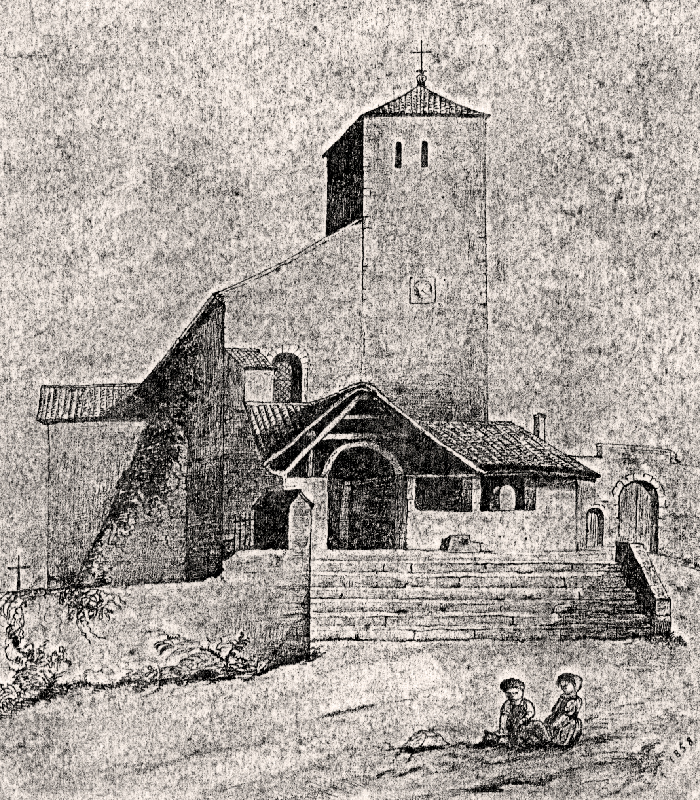
- Saint-Christophe-du-Bois's old church
- Location of Saint-Christophe-du-Bois
- Location within France Location within Pays de la Loire
- Coordinates: 47°01′46″N 0°56′35″W
- Country: France
- Region: Pays de la Loire
- Department: Maine-et-Loire
- Arrondissement: Cholet
- Canton: Sèvremoine
- Intercommunality: CA Cholet Agglomération

Government
  - Mayor (2020–2026): Sylvain Sénécaille
- Area^{1}: 21.75 km^{2} (8.40 sq mi)
- Elevation: 93 m (305 ft)
- Highest elevation: 141 m (463 ft)
- Lowest elevation: 53 m (174 ft)
- Population (2023): 2,828
  - Density: 130.0/km^{2} (336.8/sq mi)
- Time zone: UTC+01:00 (CET)
  - Summer (DST): UTC+02:00 (CEST)
- INSEE/Postal code: 49269 /49280
- ^{1} French Land Register data, which excludes lakes, ponds, glaciers > 1 km^{2} (0.386 sq mi or 247 acres) and river estuaries.

Saint-Christophe-du-Bois (French pronunciation: [sɛ̃ kʁistɔf dy bwa]) is a commune in the Maine-et-Loire department in western France.

== History ==
According to an unconfirmed tradition recorded in 1705, Saint Maurille, bishop of Angers, was the founder of Saint-Christophe in the 4th century.

A legend also reports that the first inhabitants of the town, having undertaken the construction of their village at a place called La Binaudière, drew an auspicious omen from a flock of crows which fell on them and carried branches to at the location of the present town.

== Population ==
Historical population
Year	Pop.	±% p.a.
1968	1,029	—
1975	1,302	+3.42%
1982	1,885	+5.43%
1990	2,282	+2.42%
1999	2,501	+1.02%
2007	2,680	+0.87%
2012	2,607	−0.55%
2017	2,755	+1.11%
2023	2,828	+0.44%
Source: INSEE

== See also ==
- Communes of the Maine-et-Loire department
