= Saint-Paul-du-Bois =

- Commune
- Coat of arms
- Location of Saint-Paul-du-Bois
- Location within France Location within Pays de la Loire
- Coordinates: 47°04′54″N 0°32′37″W
- Country: France
- Region: Pays de la Loire
- Department: Maine-et-Loire
- Arrondissement: Cholet
- Canton: Cholet-2
- Intercommunality: CA Cholet Agglomération

Government
  - Mayor (2020–2026): Olivier Vitré
- Area^{1}: 26.58 km^{2} (10.26 sq mi)
- Elevation: 208 m (682 ft)
- Highest elevation: 214 m (702 ft)
- Lowest elevation: 103 m (338 ft)
- Population (2023): 598
  - Density: 22.5/km^{2} (58.3/sq mi)
- Time zone: UTC+01:00 (CET)
  - Summer (DST): UTC+02:00 (CEST)
- INSEE/Postal code: 49310 /49310
- ^{1} French Land Register data, which excludes lakes, ponds, glaciers > 1 km^{2} (0.386 sq mi or 247 acres) and river estuaries.

Saint-Paul-du-Bois (French pronunciation: [sɛ̃ pɔl dy bwa]) is a commune in the Maine-et-Loire department in western France.

== See also ==
- Communes of the Maine-et-Loire department
