= Cernusson =

- Commune
- Location of Cernusson
- Location within France Location within Pays de la Loire
- Coordinates: 47°10′36″N 0°29′02″W
- Country: France
- Region: Pays de la Loire
- Department: Maine-et-Loire
- Arrondissement: Cholet
- Canton: Cholet-2
- Intercommunality: CA Cholet Agglomération

Government
  - Mayor (2020–2026): Guy Dailleux
- Area^{1}: 8.45 km^{2} (3.26 sq mi)
- Elevation: 109 m (358 ft)
- Highest elevation: 116 m (381 ft)
- Lowest elevation: 69 m (226 ft)
- Population (2023): 329
  - Density: 38.9/km^{2} (101/sq mi)
- Demonym(s): Cernussonais, Cernussonaise
- Time zone: UTC+01:00 (CET)
  - Summer (DST): UTC+02:00 (CEST)
- INSEE/Postal code: 49057 /49310
- ^{1} French Land Register data, which excludes lakes, ponds, glaciers > 1 km^{2} (0.386 sq mi or 247 acres) and river estuaries.

Cernusson (French pronunciation: [sɛʁnysɔ̃]) is a commune in the Maine-et-Loire department in western France.

== See also ==
- Communes of the Maine-et-Loire department
