= Le May-sur-Èvre =

- Commune
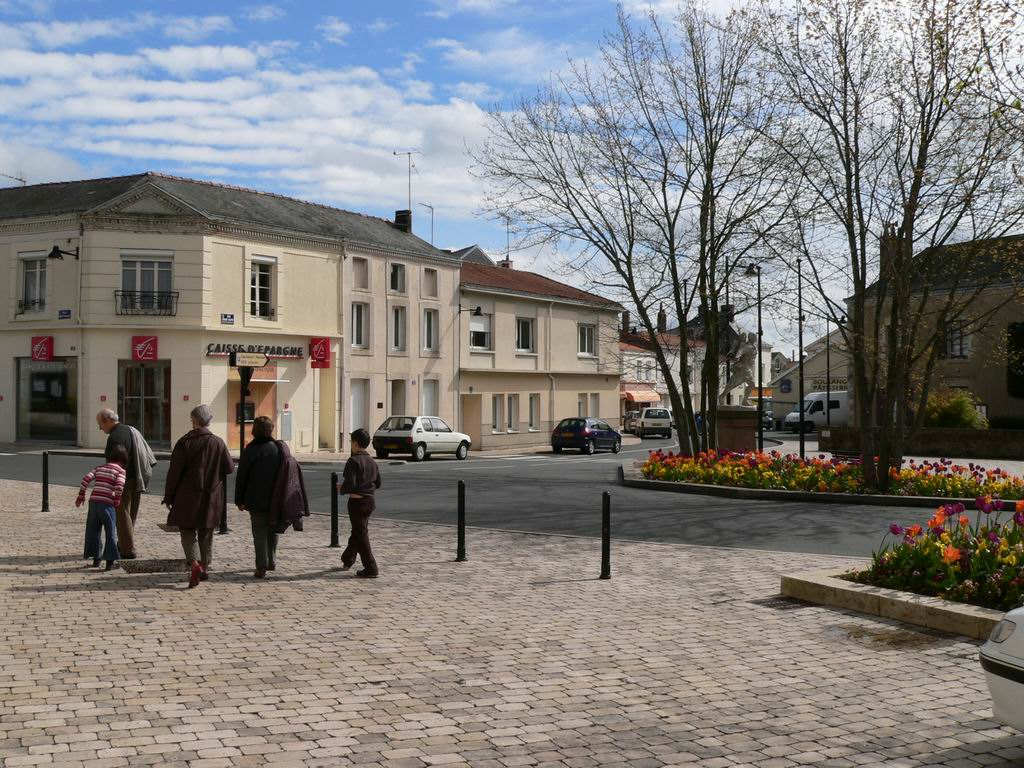
- The town of Le-May-Sur-Evre
- Location of Le May-sur-Èvre
- Location within France Location within Pays de la Loire
- Coordinates: 47°08′11″N 0°53′28″W
- Country: France
- Region: Pays de la Loire
- Department: Maine-et-Loire
- Arrondissement: Cholet
- Canton: Sèvremoine
- Intercommunality: CA Cholet Agglomération

Government
  - Mayor (2020–2026): Alain Picard
- Area^{1}: 31.85 km^{2} (12.30 sq mi)
- Highest elevation: 128 m (420 ft)
- Lowest elevation: 72 m (236 ft)
- Population (2023): 3,920
  - Density: 123/km^{2} (319/sq mi)
- Demonym(s): Maytais, Maytaise
- Time zone: UTC+01:00 (CET)
  - Summer (DST): UTC+02:00 (CEST)
- INSEE/Postal code: 49193 /49122
- Website: Le May sur Evre, site officiel
- ^{1} French Land Register data, which excludes lakes, ponds, glaciers > 1 km^{2} (0.386 sq mi or 247 acres) and river estuaries.

Le May-sur-Èvre (French pronunciation: [lə mɛ syʁ ɛvʁ], literally Le May on Èvre) is a commune in the Maine-et-Loire department in western France.

== Geography ==
The commune is traversed by the Èvre river. It is around 10 km north of Cholet, and around 50 km east of Nantes.

== Population ==
Historical population
Year	Pop.	±% p.a.
1968	3,383	—
1975	3,551	+0.69%
1982	3,806	+1.00%
1990	3,914	+0.35%
1999	3,891	−0.07%
2007	3,832	−0.19%
2012	4,007	+0.90%
2017	3,805	−1.03%
2023	3,920	+0.50%
Source: INSEE

== See also ==
- Communes of the Maine-et-Loire department
- The Church Saint-Michael of le May-sur-Èvre
