= Passavant-sur-Layon =

- Commune
- Location of Passavant-sur-Layon
- Location within France Location within Pays de la Loire
- Coordinates: 47°06′27″N 0°23′16″W
- Country: France
- Region: Pays de la Loire
- Department: Maine-et-Loire
- Arrondissement: Cholet
- Canton: Cholet-2
- Intercommunality: CA Cholet Agglomération

Government
  - Mayor (2023–2026): Olivier Lecomte
- Area^{1}: 4.91 km^{2} (1.90 sq mi)
- Elevation: 91 m (299 ft)
- Highest elevation: 112 m (367 ft)
- Lowest elevation: 62 m (203 ft)
- Population (2023): 126
  - Density: 25.7/km^{2} (66.5/sq mi)
- Demonym(s): Passavantais, Passavantaise
- Time zone: UTC+01:00 (CET)
  - Summer (DST): UTC+02:00 (CEST)
- INSEE/Postal code: 49236 /49560
- ^{1} French Land Register data, which excludes lakes, ponds, glaciers > 1 km^{2} (0.386 sq mi or 247 acres) and river estuaries.

Passavant-sur-Layon (French pronunciation: [pasavɑ̃ syʁ lɛjɔ̃], literally Passavant on Layon) is a commune in the Maine-et-Loire department in western France.

== Geography ==
The commune is traversed by the river Layon.

== See also ==
- Communes of the Maine-et-Loire department
