= Arrondissement of Cholet =

Coordinates: 47°03′N 0°53′W

Cholet
- Arrondissement
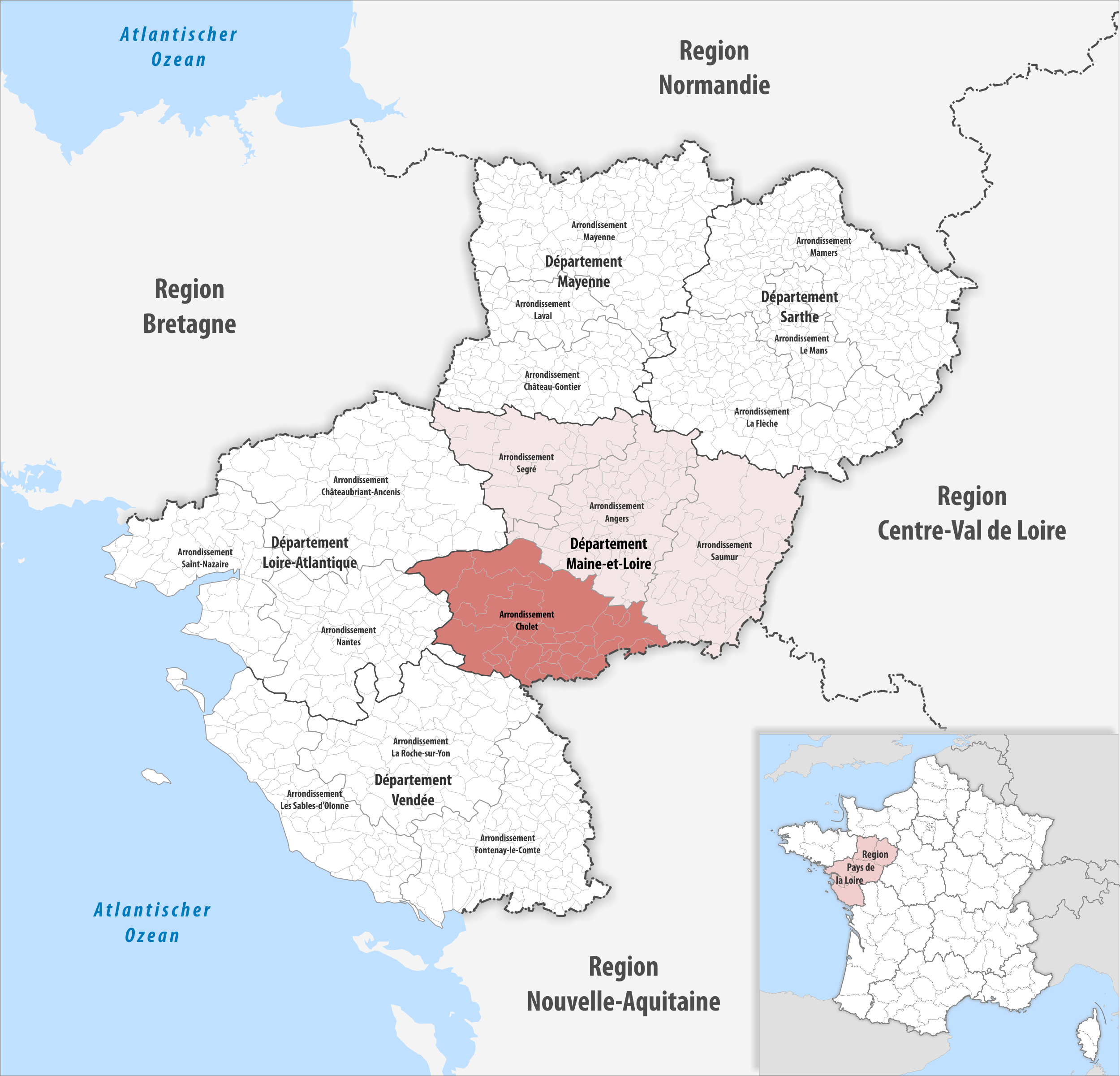
- Location within the region Pays de la Loire
- Country: France
- Region: Pays de la Loire
- Department: Maine-et-Loire
- No. of communes: {{{nbcomm}}}
- Area: 2,102.5 km^{2} (811.8 sq mi)
- Population (2023): 228,576
  - Density: 108.72/km^{2} (281.57/sq mi)
- INSEE code: 492

The arrondissement of Cholet is an arrondissement of France in the Maine-et-Loire department in the Pays de la Loire region. It has 32 communes. Its population is 226,096 (2021), and its area is 2,102.5 km^{2} (811.8 sq mi).

== Composition ==
The communes of the arrondissement of Cholet, and their INSEE codes, are:

1. Beaupréau-en-Mauges (49023)
2. Bégrolles-en-Mauges (49027)
3. Cernusson (49057)
4. Les Cerqueux (49058)
5. Chanteloup-les-Bois (49070)
6. Chemillé-en-Anjou (49092)
7. Cholet (49099)
8. Cléré-sur-Layon (49102)
9. Coron (49109)
10. Lys-Haut-Layon (49373)
11. Mauges-sur-Loire (49244)
12. Maulévrier (49192)
13. Le May-sur-Èvre (49193)
14. Mazières-en-Mauges (49195)
15. Montilliers (49211)
16. Montrevault-sur-Èvre (49218)
17. Nuaillé (49231)
18. Orée-d'Anjou (49069)
19. Passavant-sur-Layon (49236)
20. La Plaine (49240)
21. La Romagne (49260)
22. Saint-Christophe-du-Bois (49269)
23. Saint-Léger-sous-Cholet (49299)
24. Saint-Paul-du-Bois (49310)
25. La Séguinière (49332)
26. Sèvremoine (49301)
27. Somloire (49336)
28. La Tessoualle (49343)
29. Toutlemonde (49352)
30. Trémentines (49355)
31. Vezins (49371)
32. Yzernay (49381)

== History ==
The arrondissement of Beaupréau was created in 1800. The subprefecture was moved to Cholet in 1857. At the January 2017 reorganisation of the arrondissements of Maine-et-Loire, it gained nine communes from the arrondissement of Saumur.

As a result of the reorganisation of the cantons of France which came into effect in 2015, the borders of the cantons are no longer related to the borders of the arrondissements. The cantons of the arrondissement of Cholet were, as of January 2015:

1. Beaupréau
2. Champtoceaux
3. Chemillé
4. Cholet-1
5. Cholet-2
6. Cholet-3
7. Montfaucon-Montigné
8. Montrevault
9. Saint-Florent-le-Vieil
