= Canton of Cholet-2 =

Coordinates: 47°03′44″N 0°45′12″W

Cholet-2
- Canton
- Interactive map of Cholet-2
- Country: France
- Region: Pays de la Loire
- Department: Maine-et-Loire
- No. of communes: {{{nbcomm}}}
- Population (2023): 43,747
- INSEE code: 4913

Canton of Cholet-2 is a canton of France, located in the Maine-et-Loire department, in the Pays de la Loire region. At the French canton reorganisation which came into effect in March 2015, the canton was expanded from 10 to 26 communes (7 of which merged into the new commune Lys-Haut-Layon):

- Cernusson
- Les Cerqueux
- Chanteloup-les-Bois
- Cholet (partly)
- Cléré-sur-Layon
- Coron
- Lys-Haut-Layon
- Maulévrier
- Mazières-en-Mauges
- Montilliers
- Nuaillé
- Passavant-sur-Layon
- La Plaine
- Saint-Paul-du-Bois
- Somloire
- La Tessoualle
- Toutlemonde
- Trémentines
- Vezins
- Yzernay

== See also ==
- Arrondissement of Cholet
- Cantons of the Maine-et-Loire department
- Communes of the Maine-et-Loire department
