= Communes of the Maine-et-Loire department =

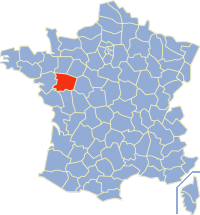

The following is a list of the 176 communes of the Maine-et-Loire department of France.

The communes cooperate in the following intercommunalities (as of 2025):

- CU Angers Loire Métropole
- CA Cholet Agglomération
- CA Mauges Communauté
- Communauté d'agglomération Saumur Val de Loire
- CC Anjou Bleu Communauté
- Communauté de communes Anjou Loir et Sarthe
- Communauté de communes Baugeois Vallée
- Communauté de communes Loire Layon Aubance
- Communauté de communes des Vallées du Haut-Anjou

INSEE code	Postal code	Commune
49002	49650	Allonnes
49007	49000	Angers
49008	49440	Angrie
49009	49260	Antoigné
49010	49420	Armaillé
49011	49260	Artannes-sur-Thouet
49012	49540	Aubigné-sur-Layon
49015	49240	Avrillé
49017	49430	Baracé
49018	49150	Baugé-en-Anjou
49020	49070	Beaucouzé
49021	49250	Beaufort-en-Anjou
49022	49750	Beaulieu-sur-Layon
49023	49600	Beaupréau-en-Mauges
49026	49370	Bécon-les-Granits
49027	49122	Bégrolles-en-Mauges
49028	49170	Béhuard
49345	49380	Bellevigne-en-Layon
49060	49400	Bellevigne-les-Châteaux
49029	49320	Blaison-Saint-Sulpice
49030	49160	Blou
49138	49250	Les Bois-d'Anjou
49035	49080	Bouchemaine
49036	49520	Bouillé-Ménard
49038	49520	Bourg-l'Évêque
49041	49650	Brain-sur-Allonnes
49045	49390	La Breille-les-Pins
49048	49125	Briollay
49050	49320	Brissac Loire Aubance
49053	49700	Brossay
49054	49440	Candé
49055	49460	Cantenay-Épinard
49056	49420	Carbay
49057	49310	Cernusson
49058	49360	Les Cerqueux
49061	49440	Challain-la-Potherie
49063	49290	Chalonnes-sur-Loire
49064	49220	Chambellay
49068	49123	Champtocé-sur-Loire
49070	49340	Chanteloup-les-Bois
49076	49140	La Chapelle-Saint-Laud
49082	49290	Chaudefonds-sur-Layon
49089	49500	Chazé-sur-Argos
49090	49125	Cheffes
49092	49120	Chemillé-en-Anjou
49067	49220	Chenillé-Champteussé
49099	49300	Cholet
49100	49700	Cizay-la-Madeleine
49102	49560	Cléré-sur-Layon
49107	49140	Cornillé-les-Caves
49109	49690	Coron
49110	49140	Corzé
49112	49260	Le Coudray-Macouard
49113	49260	Courchamps
49114	49390	Courléon
49120	49190	Denée
49121	49700	Dénezé-sous-Doué
49123	49400	Distré
49125	49700	Doué-en-Anjou
49127	49430	Durtal
49129	49000	Écouflant
49130	49460	Écuillé
49131	49260	Épieds
49367	49220	Erdre-en-Anjou
49132	49330	Étriché
49135	49460	Feneu
49140	49590	Fontevraud-l'Abbaye
49167	49610	Les Garennes sur Loire
49261	49350	Gennes-Val-de-Loire
49155	49220	Grez-Neuville
49080	49330	Les Hauts-d'Anjou
49174	49430	Huillé-Lézigné
49160	49123	Ingrandes-Le Fresne sur Loire
49161	49220	La Jaille-Yvon
49163	49140	Jarzé-Villages
49170	49330	Juvardeil
49171	49150	La Lande-Chasles
49176	49220	Le Lion-d'Angers
49178	49440	Loiré
49307	49250	Loire-Authion
49180	49160	Longué-Jumelles
49200	49770	Longuenée-en-Anjou
49182	49700	Louresse-Rochemenier
49373	49310	Lys-Haut-Layon
49188	49140	Marcé

INSEE code	Postal code	Commune
49244	49620	Mauges-sur-Loire
49192	49360	Maulévrier
49193	49122	Le May-sur-Èvre
49194	49630	Mazé-Milon
49195	49280	Mazières-en-Mauges
49201	49250	La Ménitré
49205	49330	Miré
49209	49430	Montigné-lès-Rairies
49211	49310	Montilliers
49215	49260	Montreuil-Bellay
49214	49460	Montreuil-Juigné
49216	49140	Montreuil-sur-Loir
49217	49220	Montreuil-sur-Maine
49218	49110	Montrevault-sur-Èvre
49219	49730	Montsoreau
49220	49640	Morannes sur Sarthe-Daumeray
49221	49390	Mouliherne
49222	49610	Mozé-sur-Louet
49223	49610	Mûrs-Erigné
49224	49680	Neuillé
49228	49490	Noyant-Villages
49231	49340	Nuaillé
49248	49420	Ombrée d'Anjou
49069	49270	Orée-d'Anjou
49235	49730	Parnay
49236	49560	Passavant-sur-Layon
49237	49490	La Pellerine
49240	49360	La Plaine
49241	49124	Le Plessis-Grammoire
49246	49130	Les Ponts-de-Cé
49247	49170	La Possonnière
49253	49260	Le Puy-Notre-Dame
49257	49430	Les Rairies
49377	49140	Rives-du-Loir-en-Anjou
49259	49190	Rochefort-sur-Loire
49260	49740	La Romagne
49262	49400	Rou-Marson
49266	49170	Saint-Augustin-des-Bois
49267	49124	Saint-Barthélemy-d'Anjou
49269	49280	Saint-Christophe-du-Bois
49271	49370	Saint-Clément-de-la-Place
49272	49350	Saint-Clément-des-Levées
49278	49130	Sainte-Gemmes-sur-Loire
49283	49170	Saint-Georges-sur-Loire
49284	49170	Saint-Germain-des-Prés
49288	49130	Saint-Jean-de-la-Croix
49291	49260	Saint-Just-sur-Dive
49294	49070	Saint-Lambert-la-Potherie
49298	49170	Saint-Léger-de-Linières
49299	49280	Saint-Léger-sous-Cholet
49302	49260	Saint-Macaire-du-Bois
49306	49170	Saint-Martin-du-Fouilloux
49308	49610	Saint-Melaine-sur-Aubance
49310	49310	Saint-Paul-du-Bois
49311	49160	Saint-Philbert-du-Peuple
49326	49800	Sarrigné
49328	49400	Saumur
49329	49170	Savennières
49330	49330	Sceaux-d'Anjou
49331	49500	Segré-en-Anjou Bleu
49332	49280	La Séguinière
49333	49140	Seiches-sur-le-Loir
49334	49140	Sermaise
49301	49450	Sèvremoine
49336	49360	Somloire
49338	49610	Soulaines-sur-Aubance
49339	49460	Soulaire-et-Bourg
49341	49400	Souzay-Champigny
49086	49380	Terranjou
49343	49280	La Tessoualle
49344	49220	Thorigné-d'Anjou
49347	49125	Tiercé
49352	49360	Toutlemonde
49353	49800	Trélazé
49355	49340	Trémentines
49003	49700	Tuffalun
49358	49730	Turquant
49359	49700	Les Ulmes
49183	49370	Val d'Erdre-Auxence
49292	49750	Val-du-Layon
49361	49730	Varennes-sur-Loire
49362	49400	Varrains
49364	49260	Vaudelnay
49368	49390	Vernantes
49369	49390	Vernoil-le-Fourrier
49370	49400	Verrie
49323	49480	Verrières-en-Anjou
49371	49340	Vezins
49374	49400	Villebernier
49378	49680	Vivy
49381	49360	Yzernay
