= Doue =

Doue or Doué may refer to:

== People with the surname ==
- Désiré Doué (born 2005), French footballer
- Eddy Doué (born 2005), Ivorian footballer
- Guéla Doué (born 2002), Ivorian footballer
- Joseph Foullon de Doué (1715–1789), French politician
- Marc-Olivier Doué (born 2000), French footballer
- Noumandiez Doué (born 1970), Ivorian football referee
- Peabo Doue (born 1991), American soccer player
- Toussaint Bertin de la Doué (1680–1743), French composer

== Places ==
- Doue, Seine-et-Marne, France
- Doué River, Senegal
- Doué-en-Anjou, France
- Doué-la-Fontaine, France

== See also ==
- Doues, Aosta Valley, Italy
