= Meigné =

- Part of Doué-en-Anjou
- Location of Meigné
- Location within France Location within Pays de la Loire
- Coordinates: 47°13′57″N 0°12′34″W
- Country: France
- Region: Pays de la Loire
- Department: Maine-et-Loire
- Arrondissement: Saumur
- Canton: Doué-la-Fontaine
- Commune: Doué-en-Anjou
- Area^{1}: 13.19 km^{2} (5.09 sq mi)
- Elevation: 69 m (226 ft)
- Highest elevation: 100 m (330 ft)
- Lowest elevation: 59 m (194 ft)
- Population (2022): 299
  - Density: 22.7/km^{2} (58.7/sq mi)
- Demonym(s): Meignéen, Meignéenne
- Time zone: UTC+01:00 (CET)
  - Summer (DST): UTC+02:00 (CEST)
- Postal code: 49700
- ^{1} French Land Register data, which excludes lakes, ponds, glaciers > 1 km^{2} (0.386 sq mi or 247 acres) and river estuaries.

Meigné (French pronunciation: [mɛɲe]) is a former commune in the Maine-et-Loire department in western France. On 30 December 2016, it was merged into the new commune Doué-en-Anjou.

== See also ==
- Communes of the Maine-et-Loire department
