= Noyant-la-Plaine =

- Part of Tuffalun
- Location of Noyant-la-Plaine
- Location within France Location within Pays de la Loire
- Coordinates: 47°16′33″N 0°21′33″W
- Country: France
- Region: Pays de la Loire
- Department: Maine-et-Loire
- Arrondissement: Saumur
- Canton: Doué-la-Fontaine
- Commune: Tuffalun
- Area^{1}: 4.99 km^{2} (1.93 sq mi)
- Elevation: 76 m (249 ft)
- Highest elevation: 87 m (285 ft)
- Lowest elevation: 57 m (187 ft)
- Population (2022): 348
  - Density: 69.7/km^{2} (181/sq mi)
- Demonym(s): Noyantais, Noyantaise
- Time zone: UTC+01:00 (CET)
  - Summer (DST): UTC+02:00 (CEST)
- Postal code: 49700
- ^{1} French Land Register data, which excludes lakes, ponds, glaciers > 1 km^{2} (0.386 sq mi or 247 acres) and river estuaries.

Noyant-la-Plaine (French pronunciation: [nwajɑ̃ la plɛn]) is a former commune in the Maine-et-Loire department in western France. On 1 January 2016, it was merged into the new commune of Tuffalun.

== See also ==
- Communes of the Maine-et-Loire department
