= Forges, Maine-et-Loire =

Forges
- Part of Doué-en-Anjou
- Location of Forges
- Location within France Location within Pays de la Loire
- Coordinates: 47°13′11″N 0°14′36″W
- Country: France
- Region: Pays de la Loire
- Department: Maine-et-Loire
- Arrondissement: Saumur
- Canton: Doué-la-Fontaine
- Commune: Doué-en-Anjou
- Area^{1}: 9.01 km^{2} (3.48 sq mi)
- Highest elevation: 109 m (358 ft)
- Lowest elevation: 54 m (177 ft)
- Population (2022): 350
  - Density: 39/km^{2} (100/sq mi)
- Demonym(s): Forgéen, Forgéenne
- Time zone: UTC+01:00 (CET)
  - Summer (DST): UTC+02:00 (CEST)
- Postal code: 49700
- Website: www.forges49.fr
- ^{1} French Land Register data, which excludes lakes, ponds, glaciers > 1 km^{2} (0.386 sq mi or 247 acres) and river estuaries.

Forges (French pronunciation: [fɔʁʒ]) is a former commune in the Maine-et-Loire department in western France. On 30 December 2016, it was merged into the new commune Doué-en-Anjou.

== See also ==
- Communes of the Maine-et-Loire department
