= Louerre =

- Part of Tuffalun
- Coat of arms
- Location of Louerre
- Location within France Location within Pays de la Loire
- Coordinates: 47°17′50″N 0°19′23″W
- Country: France
- Region: Pays de la Loire
- Department: Maine-et-Loire
- Arrondissement: Saumur
- Canton: Doué-la-Fontaine
- Commune: Tuffalun
- Area^{1}: 14.44 km^{2} (5.58 sq mi)
- Elevation: 70 m (230 ft)
- Highest elevation: 103 m (338 ft)
- Lowest elevation: 49 m (161 ft)
- Population (2022): 461
  - Density: 31.9/km^{2} (82.7/sq mi)
- Demonym(s): Lorien, Lorienne
- Time zone: UTC+01:00 (CET)
  - Summer (DST): UTC+02:00 (CEST)
- Postal code: 49700
- ^{1} French Land Register data, which excludes lakes, ponds, glaciers > 1 km^{2} (0.386 sq mi or 247 acres) and river estuaries.

Louerre (French pronunciation: [lwɛʁ]) is a former commune in the Maine-et-Loire department in western France. On 1 January 2016, it was merged into the new commune of Tuffalun.

== See also ==
- Communes of the Maine-et-Loire department
