= Saint-Georges-sur-Layon =

- Part of Doué-en-Anjou
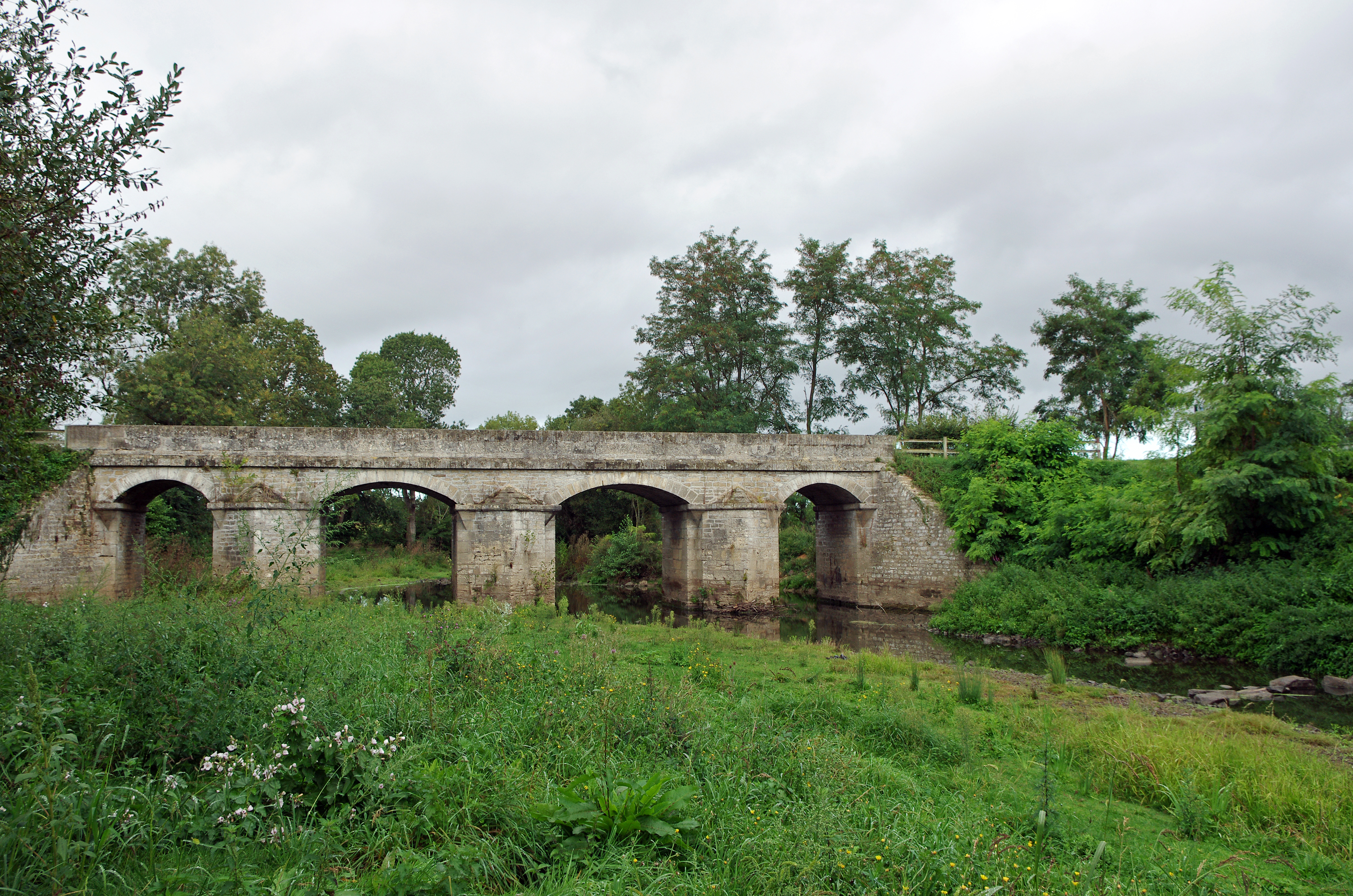
- Location of Saint-Georges-sur-Layon
- Location within France Location within Pays de la Loire
- Coordinates: 47°11′54″N 0°22′02″W
- Country: France
- Region: Pays de la Loire
- Department: Maine-et-Loire
- Arrondissement: Saumur
- Canton: Doué-la-Fontaine
- Commune: Doué-en-Anjou
- Area^{1}: 22.5 km^{2} (8.7 sq mi)
- Elevation: 49 m (161 ft)
- Highest elevation: 86 m (282 ft)
- Lowest elevation: 39 m (128 ft)
- Population (2022): 758
  - Density: 33.7/km^{2} (87.3/sq mi)
- Time zone: UTC+01:00 (CET)
  - Summer (DST): UTC+02:00 (CEST)
- Postal code: 49700
- ^{1} French Land Register data, which excludes lakes, ponds, glaciers > 1 km^{2} (0.386 sq mi or 247 acres) and river estuaries.

Saint-Georges-sur-Layon (French pronunciation: [sɛ̃ ʒɔʁʒ syʁ lɛjɔ̃], literally Saint Georges on Layon) is a former commune in the Maine-et-Loire department in western France. On 30 December 2016, it was merged into the new commune Doué-en-Anjou. Its population was 758 in 2022.

== Geography ==
The commune is traversed by the river Layon.

== See also ==
- Communes of the Maine-et-Loire department
