= Ambillou-Château =

- Part of Tuffalun
- Location of Ambillou-Château
- Location within France Location within Pays de la Loire
- Coordinates: 47°15′51″N 0°20′34″W
- Country: France
- Region: Pays de la Loire
- Department: Maine-et-Loire
- Arrondissement: Saumur
- Canton: Doué-la-Fontaine
- Commune: Tuffalun
- Area^{1}: 19.99 km^{2} (7.72 sq mi)
- Elevation: 77 m (253 ft)
- Highest elevation: 101 m (331 ft)
- Lowest elevation: 47 m (154 ft)
- Population (2023): 932
  - Density: 46.6/km^{2} (121/sq mi)
- Time zone: UTC+01:00 (CET)
  - Summer (DST): UTC+02:00 (CEST)
- Postal code: 49700
- ^{1} French Land Register data, which excludes lakes, ponds, glaciers > 1 km^{2} (0.386 sq mi or 247 acres) and river estuaries.

Ambillou-Château (French pronunciation: [ɑ̃biju ʃɑto]) is a former commune in the Maine-et-Loire department in western France. On 1 January 2016, it was merged into the new commune of Tuffalun.

== See also ==
- Communes of the Maine-et-Loire department
