= Vercher =

Vercher is a surname. Notable people with the surname include:

- Joey Vercher (AKA Joey Fatts, born 1991), American rapper, songwriter and record producer
- Mattéo Vercher (born 2001), French cyclist

== See also ==
- Les Verchers-sur-Layon, a former commune in the Maine-et-Loire department in France
