= Concourson-sur-Layon =

- Part of Doué-en-Anjou
- Location of Concourson-sur-Layon
- Location within France Location within Pays de la Loire
- Coordinates: 47°10′32″N 0°20′21″W
- Country: France
- Region: Pays de la Loire
- Department: Maine-et-Loire
- Arrondissement: Saumur
- Canton: Doué-la-Fontaine
- Commune: Doué-en-Anjou
- Area^{1}: 18.21 km^{2} (7.03 sq mi)
- Elevation: 51 m (167 ft)
- Highest elevation: 95 m (312 ft)
- Lowest elevation: 46 m (151 ft)
- Population (2022): 575
  - Density: 31.6/km^{2} (81.8/sq mi)
- Demonym(s): Concoursonnais, Concoursonnaise
- Time zone: UTC+01:00 (CET)
  - Summer (DST): UTC+02:00 (CEST)
- Postal code: 49700
- ^{1} French Land Register data, which excludes lakes, ponds, glaciers > 1 km^{2} (0.386 sq mi or 247 acres) and river estuaries.

Concourson-sur-Layon (French pronunciation: [kɔ̃kuʁsɔ̃ syʁ lɛ̃jɔ̃], literally Concourson on Layon) is a former commune in the Maine-et-Loire department in western France. On 30 December 2016, it was merged into the new commune Doué-en-Anjou.

== Geography ==
The village lies in the middle of the commune, on the right bank of the Layon, which flows northwestward through the commune.

== See also ==
- Communes of the Maine-et-Loire department
