= Brigné =

- Part of Doué-en-Anjou
- Location of Brigné
- Location within France Location within Pays de la Loire
- Coordinates: 47°14′33″N 0°22′59″W
- Country: France
- Region: Pays de la Loire
- Department: Maine-et-Loire
- Arrondissement: Saumur
- Canton: Doué-la-Fontaine
- Commune: Doué-en-Anjou
- Area^{1}: 14.63 km^{2} (5.65 sq mi)
- Elevation: 75 m (246 ft)
- Highest elevation: 90 m (300 ft)
- Lowest elevation: 40 m (130 ft)
- Population (2023): 446
  - Density: 30.5/km^{2} (79.0/sq mi)
- Time zone: UTC+01:00 (CET)
  - Summer (DST): UTC+02:00 (CEST)
- Postal code: 49700
- ^{1} French Land Register data, which excludes lakes, ponds, glaciers > 1 km^{2} (0.386 sq mi or 247 acres) and river estuaries.

Brigné (French pronunciation: [bʁiɲe]) is a former commune in the Maine-et-Loire department in western France. On 30 December 2016, it was merged into the new commune Doué-en-Anjou.

== Geography ==
The commune is traversed by the river Layon.

== See also ==
- Communes of the Maine-et-Loire department
