= Montfort, Maine-et-Loire =

Montfort
- Part of Doué-en-Anjou
- Location of Montfort
- Location within France Location within Pays de la Loire
- Coordinates: 47°11′54″N 0°12′35″W
- Country: France
- Region: Pays de la Loire
- Department: Maine-et-Loire
- Arrondissement: Saumur
- Canton: Doué-la-Fontaine
- Commune: Doué-en-Anjou
- Area^{1}: 4.41 km^{2} (1.70 sq mi)
- Elevation: 91 m (299 ft)
- Highest elevation: 97 m (318 ft)
- Lowest elevation: 55 m (180 ft)
- Population (2022): 86
  - Density: 20/km^{2} (51/sq mi)
- Demonym(s): Montfortais, Montfortaise
- Time zone: UTC+01:00 (CET)
  - Summer (DST): UTC+02:00 (CEST)
- Postal code: 49700
- ^{1} French Land Register data, which excludes lakes, ponds, glaciers > 1 km^{2} (0.386 sq mi or 247 acres) and river estuaries.

Montfort (French pronunciation: [mɔ̃fɔʁ]) is a former commune in the Maine-et-Loire department in western France. On 30 December 2016, it was merged into the new commune Doué-en-Anjou.

== See also ==
- Communes of the Maine-et-Loire department
