= Doué-la-Fontaine =

- Part of Doué-en-Anjou
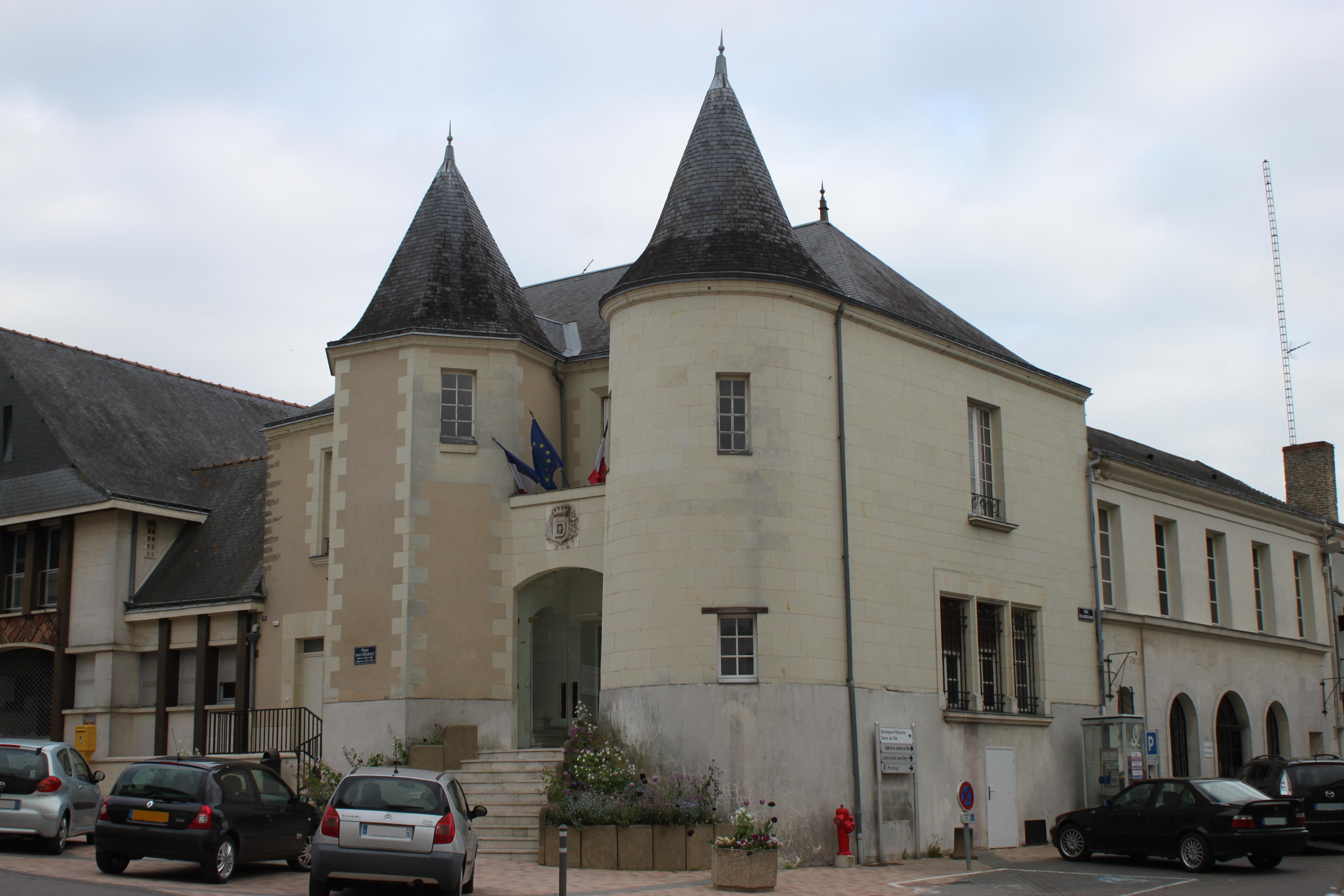
- The town hall of Doué-la-Fontaine
- Location of Doué-la-Fontaine
- Location within France Location within Pays de la Loire
- Coordinates: 47°11′38″N 0°16′28″W
- Country: France
- Region: Pays de la Loire
- Department: Maine-et-Loire
- Arrondissement: Saumur
- Canton: Doué-la-Fontaine
- Commune: Doué-en-Anjou
- Area^{1}: 35.9 km^{2} (13.9 sq mi)
- Elevation: 76 m (249 ft)
- Highest elevation: 105 m (344 ft)
- Lowest elevation: 48 m (157 ft)
- Population (2022): 7,863
  - Density: 219/km^{2} (567/sq mi)
- Time zone: UTC+01:00 (CET)
  - Summer (DST): UTC+02:00 (CEST)
- Postal code: 49700
- ^{1} French Land Register data, which excludes lakes, ponds, glaciers > 1 km^{2} (0.386 sq mi or 247 acres) and river estuaries.

Doué-la-Fontaine (French pronunciation: [dwe la fɔ̃tɛn]) is a former commune in the Maine-et-Loire department in western France. On 30 December 2016, it was merged into the new commune Doué-en-Anjou. It is located in the heart of Anjou, a few kilometres from the great châteaux of the Loire Valley.

== Sights ==
The town was known as Vetus Doadum ("Old Doadum"), Teotuadum castrum, in Late Antiquity, identifiable in a document of 631 as Castrum Doe. The foundations of a 6th-century circular baptistery beside the natural springs has been uncovered beneath the ruins of the pre-Romanesque church of Saint-Léger, itself destroyed in the 17th century. It was the site of a Gallo-Roman villa that was inherited by the Carolingians. In his villa here, Theoduadum palatium, Louis the Pious was informed of the death of his father Charlemagne in 814 and hurried to Aachen to be crowned. The villa was turned into a motte in the 10th century, around which the village developed, in part in excavated troglodyte dwellings. In 1055 the site was identified as Doedus, then Docium in 1177.

Doué-la-Fontaine is the site of the oldest habitable donjon (keep) in France, dating back to c. 950. No traces of Doué's medieval fortifications remain, save the names of "gates" given to certain streets. The castle is widely believed to have been the first European castle to be built out of stone (at around 950).

Nearby are the troglodyte dwellings, where the inhabitants took refuge from the Normans, and commercial mushroom-growing caves. The stone of Doué-la-Fontaine was quarried for sarcophagi 4 km (2.5 mi) from the town. The zoo of Doué-la-Fontaine is partly built within the network of the troglodytes sites and dwellings. Recently, a cave containing sarcophagi was unearthed.

In 1793, Doué-la-Fontaine was the site of massacres during the counter-Revolutionary Revolt in the Vendée, suppressed by General Santerre.

Zoo de Doué is 17 hectare zoon based in the commune.

== Events ==
Doué-la-Fontaine is known as the rose capital of France. A "Festival of the Rose" is held there in July of each year, where in one park alone more than 800 varieties can be seen.

== Notable people ==
- Anthony Réveillère, football player for Olympique Lyonnais.

== See also ==
- Communes of the Maine-et-Loire department
