= Les Verchers-sur-Layon =

- Part of Doué-en-Anjou
- Location of Les Verchers-sur-Layon
- Location within France Location within Pays de la Loire
- Coordinates: 47°09′17″N 0°17′44″W
- Country: France
- Region: Pays de la Loire
- Department: Maine-et-Loire
- Arrondissement: Saumur
- Canton: Doué-la-Fontaine
- Commune: Doué-en-Anjou
- Area^{1}: 30.7 km^{2} (11.9 sq mi)
- Elevation: 54 m (177 ft)
- Highest elevation: 109 m (358 ft)
- Lowest elevation: 48 m (157 ft)
- Population (2022): 853
  - Density: 27.8/km^{2} (72.0/sq mi)
- Demonym(s): Verchéen, Verchéenne
- Time zone: UTC+01:00 (CET)
  - Summer (DST): UTC+02:00 (CEST)
- Postal code: 49700
- ^{1} French Land Register data, which excludes lakes, ponds, glaciers > 1 km^{2} (0.386 sq mi or 247 acres) and river estuaries.

Les Verchers-sur-Layon (French pronunciation: [le vɛʁʃe syʁ lɛ̃jɔ̃], literally Les Verchers on Layon) is a former commune in the Maine-et-Loire department in western France. On 30 December 2016, it was merged into the new commune Doué-en-Anjou.

== Geography ==
The commune is traversed by the river Layon.

== See also ==
- Communes of the Maine-et-Loire department
