= Le Puy-Notre-Dame =

- Commune
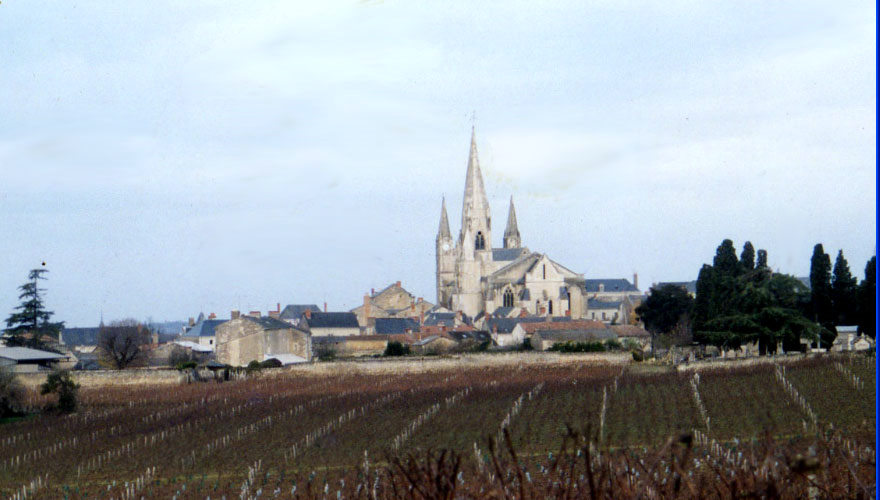
- A general view of Le Puy-Notre-Dame
- Location of Le Puy-Notre-Dame
- Location within France Location within Pays de la Loire
- Coordinates: 47°07′34″N 0°14′02″W
- Country: France
- Region: Pays de la Loire
- Department: Maine-et-Loire
- Arrondissement: Saumur
- Canton: Doué-en-Anjou
- Intercommunality: CA Saumur Val de Loire

Government
  - Mayor (2020–2026): Isabelle Isabellon
- Area^{1}: 15.87 km^{2} (6.13 sq mi)
- Elevation: 103 m (338 ft)
- Highest elevation: 106 m (348 ft)
- Lowest elevation: 32 m (105 ft)
- Population (2023): 1,084
  - Density: 68.30/km^{2} (176.9/sq mi)
- Time zone: UTC+01:00 (CET)
  - Summer (DST): UTC+02:00 (CEST)
- INSEE/Postal code: 49253 /49260
- ^{1} French Land Register data, which excludes lakes, ponds, glaciers > 1 km^{2} (0.386 sq mi or 247 acres) and river estuaries.

Le Puy-Notre-Dame (French pronunciation: [lə pɥi nɔtʁ dam]) or Le Puy is a commune in the Maine-et-Loire department in western France.

The village is built on the hill of Puy, also spelt “Pua”.

Its inhabitants are known as Puechens.

== History ==
Protohistoric traces have been found.

Le Puy (Podio beatae Mariae in the 7th century had become known as Puy-la-Montagne by 1793 and the hill of Puy as Mary's Mountain. William 9th, Duke of Aquitaine is reputed to have brought back a waistband of the Virgin Mary from the Crusades and deposited it in the church. His granddaughter Eleanor of Aquitaine founded a collegial church to honour the relic which, according to the legend, facilitated pregnancies and male offspring. Louis XI founded a chapter about 1480 and this became a site of pilgrimage the Sunday after 8 September, the Nativity. The relic can still be viewed here.

The town became a stop on the pilgrimage to Santiago de Compostela (17th century houses used by the pilgrims still exist).

Its location between the territories of the Counts of Anjou and Aquitaine lent its strategic importance and traces of an encircling town wall remain.

== Places ==
- Subterranean refuges exist under the town and Sanziers;
- Presshouse at the Château du Lys in Sanziers;
- Subterranean dovecote at La Hupponnière;
- Cavier mill in ruins;
- Ancient Franciscan convent chapel (barn).

== Agriculture ==
Local agricultural production is mixed with vineyards (15 km^{2}), orchards and market gardening taking place alongside pasture and woodlands. Beekeeping also takes place. The Cave Saint-Maur in Sanziers is known for its mushroom production. Local A.O.C wines are Anjou, Saumur, and sparkling Saumur.

== Administration ==
List of successive mayors
| Term | Name |
|---|---|
| 2008–2014 | Jean-Luc Clayes |
| 2014–2020 | Patrice Mouchard |
| 2020-incumbent | Isabelle Isabellon |

== Miscellaneous ==
Puy derives from the Provençal word "Puech", meaning an isolated hill.

== See also ==
- Communes of the Maine-et-Loire département

== External links (in French, unless otherwise indicated) ==
- Tourism website
- Town Council website
- Le Puy-Notre-Dame on the Institut Géographique National site
- Weather for Le Puy-Notre-Dame
- Closest towns to Le Puy-Notre-Dame
- Personal page about Le Puy-Notre-Dame
