= Tuffalun =

- Commune
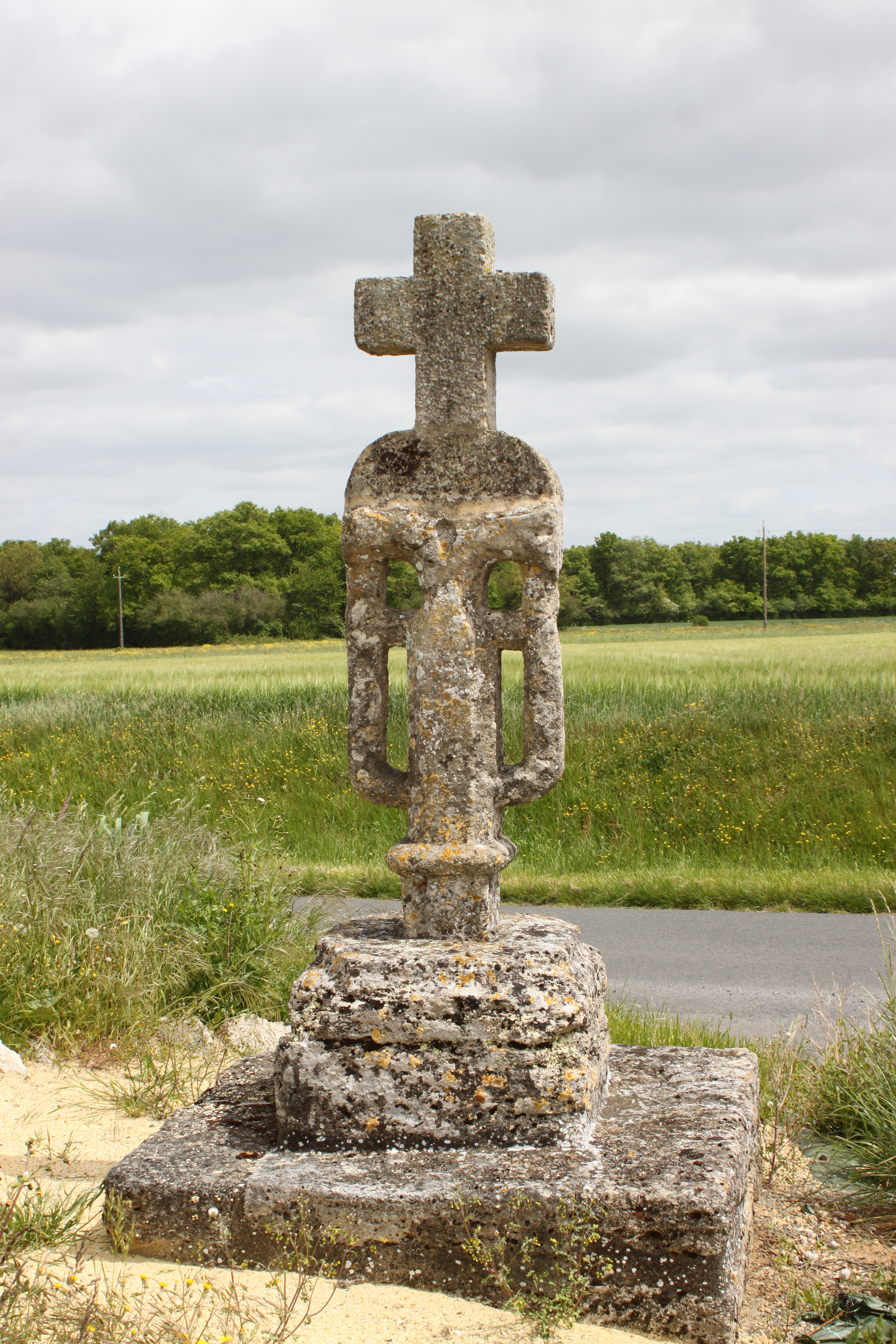
- The cross of la Grézille in Ambillou-Château
- Location of Tuffalun
- Location within France Location within Pays de la Loire
- Coordinates: 47°15′43″N 0°20′38″W
- Country: France
- Region: Pays de la Loire
- Department: Maine-et-Loire
- Arrondissement: Saumur
- Canton: Doué-en-Anjou
- Intercommunality: CA Saumur Val de Loire

Government
  - Mayor (2023–2026): Nathalie Gohlke
- Area^{1}: 39.42 km^{2} (15.22 sq mi)
- Population (2023): 1,746
  - Density: 44.29/km^{2} (114.7/sq mi)
- Time zone: UTC+01:00 (CET)
  - Summer (DST): UTC+02:00 (CEST)
- INSEE/Postal code: 49003 /49700
- ^{1} French Land Register data, which excludes lakes, ponds, glaciers > 1 km^{2} (0.386 sq mi or 247 acres) and river estuaries.

Tuffalun (French pronunciation: [tyfalœ̃]) is a commune in the Maine-et-Loire department of western France. The municipality was established on 1 January 2016 and consists of the former communes of Ambillou-Château, Louerre and Noyant-la-Plaine.

== Population ==
The populations of the communes prior to the merger were, as of 2013:

- Ambillou-Château - 941
- Louerre - 485
- Noyant-la-Plaine - 352

== See also ==
- Communes of the Maine-et-Loire department
