= Zoo de Doué =

Zoo in Doué-la-Fontaine, Maine-et-Loire, France

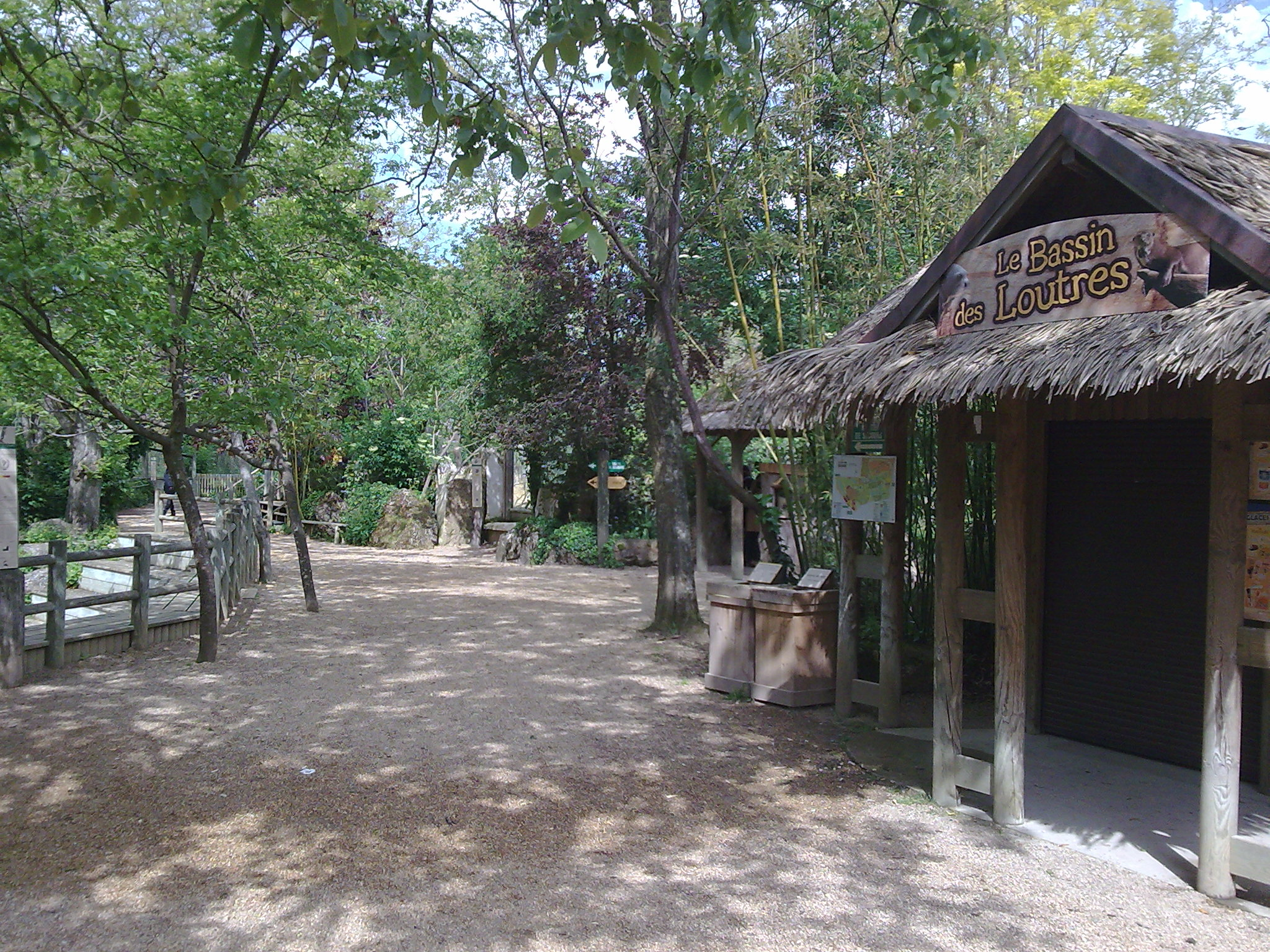
- Interactive map of Zoo de Doué
- 47°11′24″N 0°18′0″W
- Date opened: 1961
- Location: Doué-la-Fontaine, Maine-et-Loire, France
- Land area: 14-hectare (35-acre)
- No. of animals: 2000
- No. of species: 130
- Annual visitors: 274,599
- Memberships: EAZA
- Website: http://www.bioparc-zoo.fr/en/

The Zoo de Doué (formally Bioparc de Doué-la-Fontaine) is a 14-hectare (35-acre) zoo that opened in 1961 in Doué-la-Fontaine, Maine-et-Loire, France.

The zoo is home to some 2,000 individual animals representing about 130 species, and is a member of the European Association of Zoos and Aquaria (EAZA) and the World Association of Zoos and Aquariums (WAZA). The property is on the site of a former shelled sedimentary rock quarry, with evidence of this being visible in many enclosures; however, the zoo uses these unique features advantageously for the animals, as the landscape and topography it creates provides animal enrichment, hiding places, caves, lookout points, and elevated nesting sites for birds (such as in the aviaries). The entire park is connected by a series of old quarry tunnels and pathways, with sprawling vines and mosses draping over the walls.

== History ==
- 1961: The zoo was inaugurated.
- 1964: Louis Gay (the founder of the zoo) acquired Kaa, the giant python who becomes the zoo’s most famous attraction for about twelve years.
- 1971: A new attraction, called Safari Serpent, was launched. The park celebrated also its tenth anniversary.
- 1977: Safari Serpent was closed.
- 1981: The spider monkeys are the first primates to leave their cages to inhabit the first island created in the zoo.
- 1989: Naturoscope was opened, featuring exhibitions in partnership with WWF.
- 1999: After three months of administrative closure, the zoo reopened. Louis Gay retired.
- 2005: Black rhinos moved into the Falun Valley specially designed for them.
- 2006: The Camp des Girafes restaurant opened.
- 2007: A pair of giant otters from Colombia joined the zoo’s collection.
- 2009: La Grande volière sud-américaine was inaugurated.
- 2011: The zoo changed its name to Bioparc de Doué-la-Fontaine.
- 2013: Sanctuaire des okapis was inaugurated.
- 2020: The zoo opened Le Cratère des Carnivores, a new space for lions, cheetahs, meerkats, bat-eared foxes, and aardvarks.

== Gallery ==
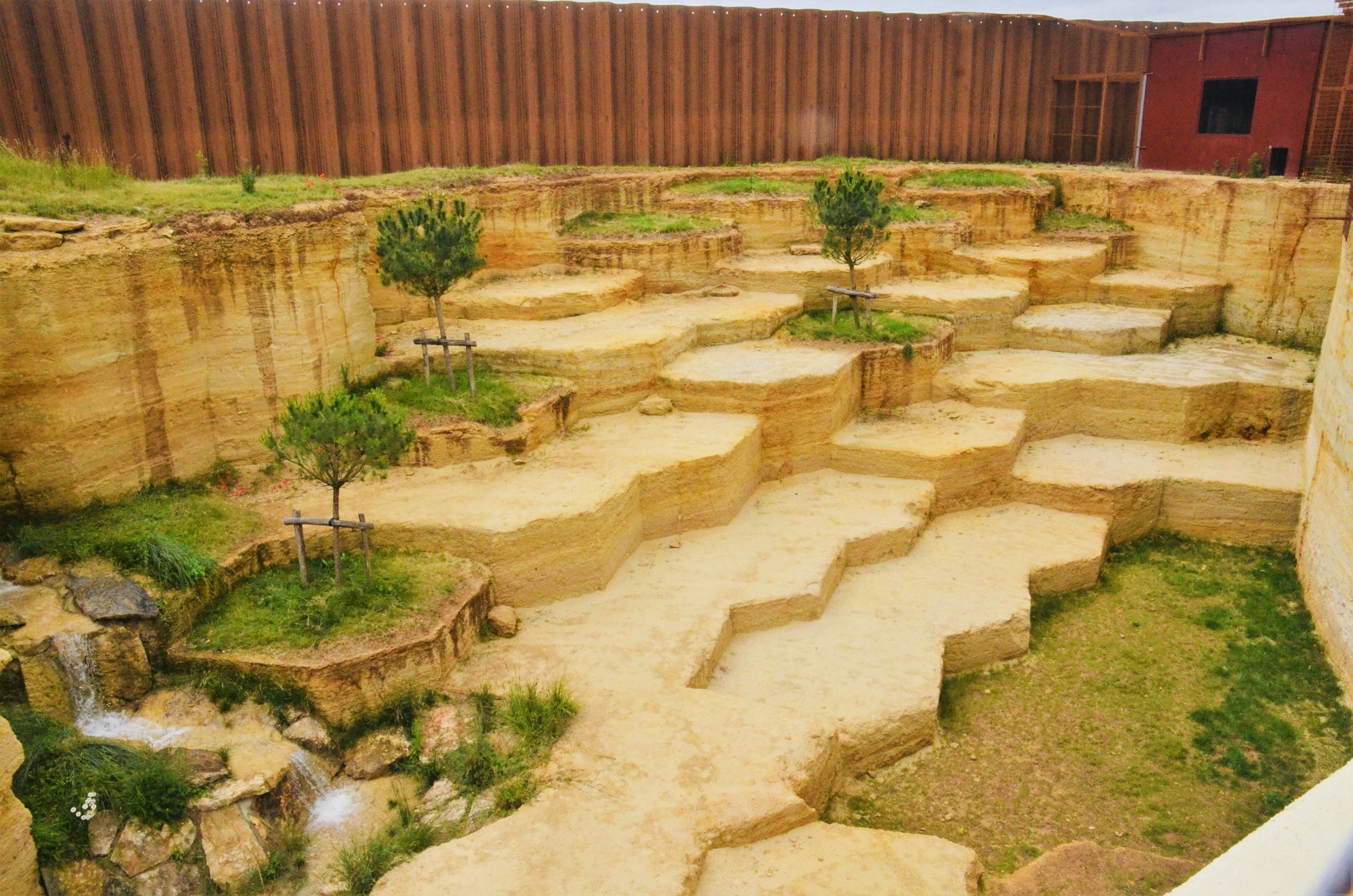
The snow leopard enclosure, built into former rock quarry.

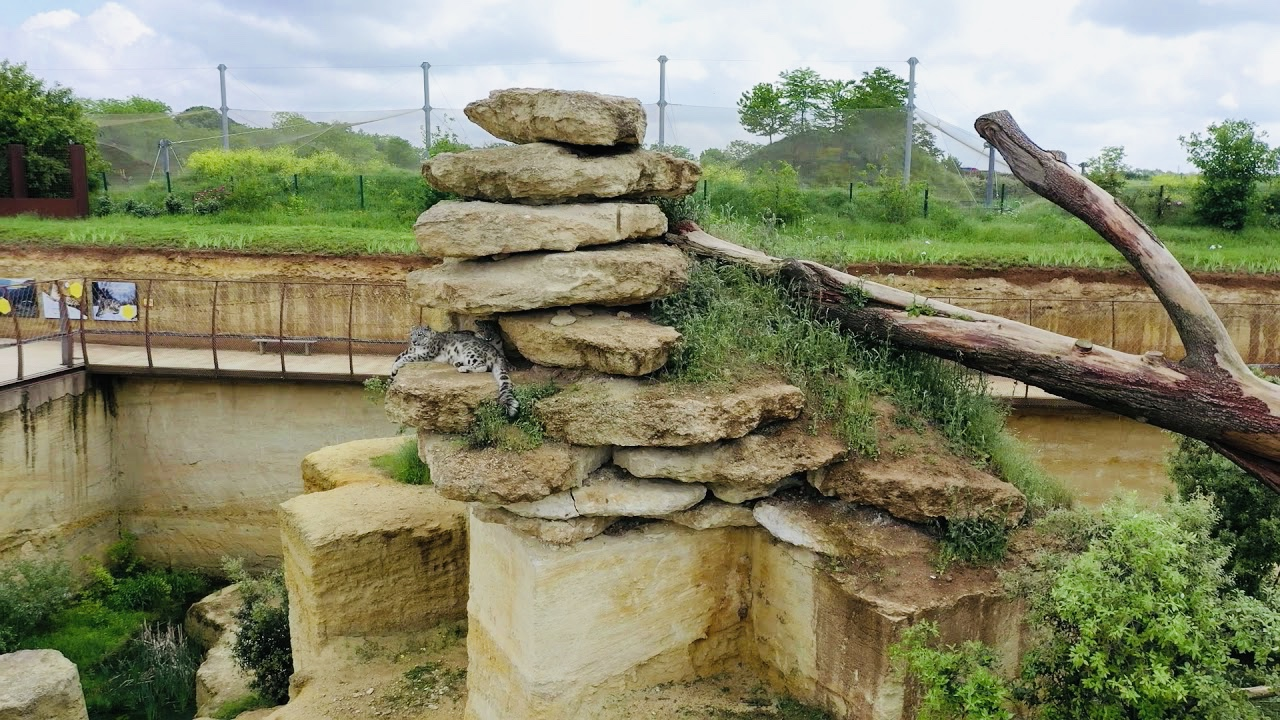
Snow leopard resting, center.

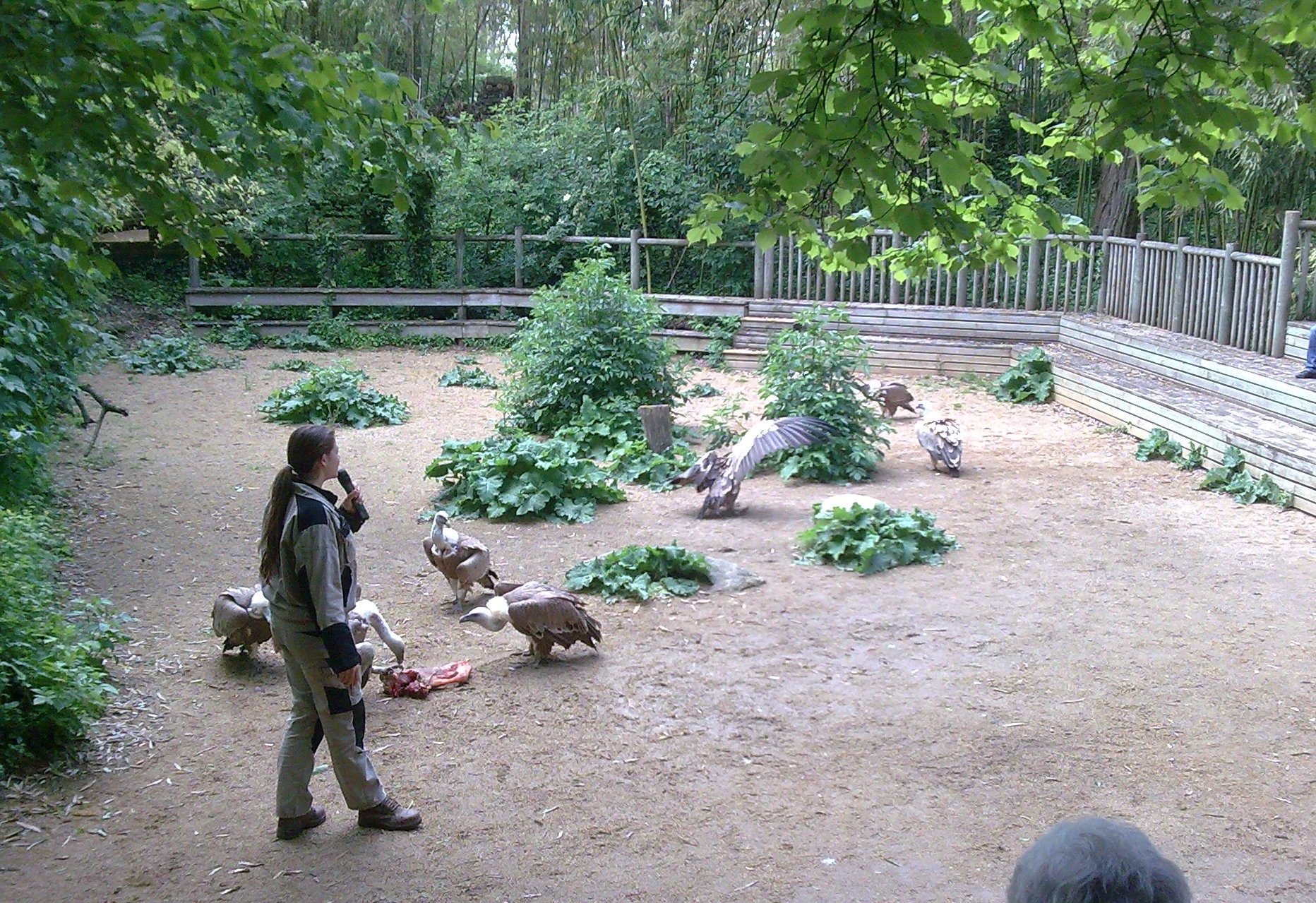
Bird show at the zoo.

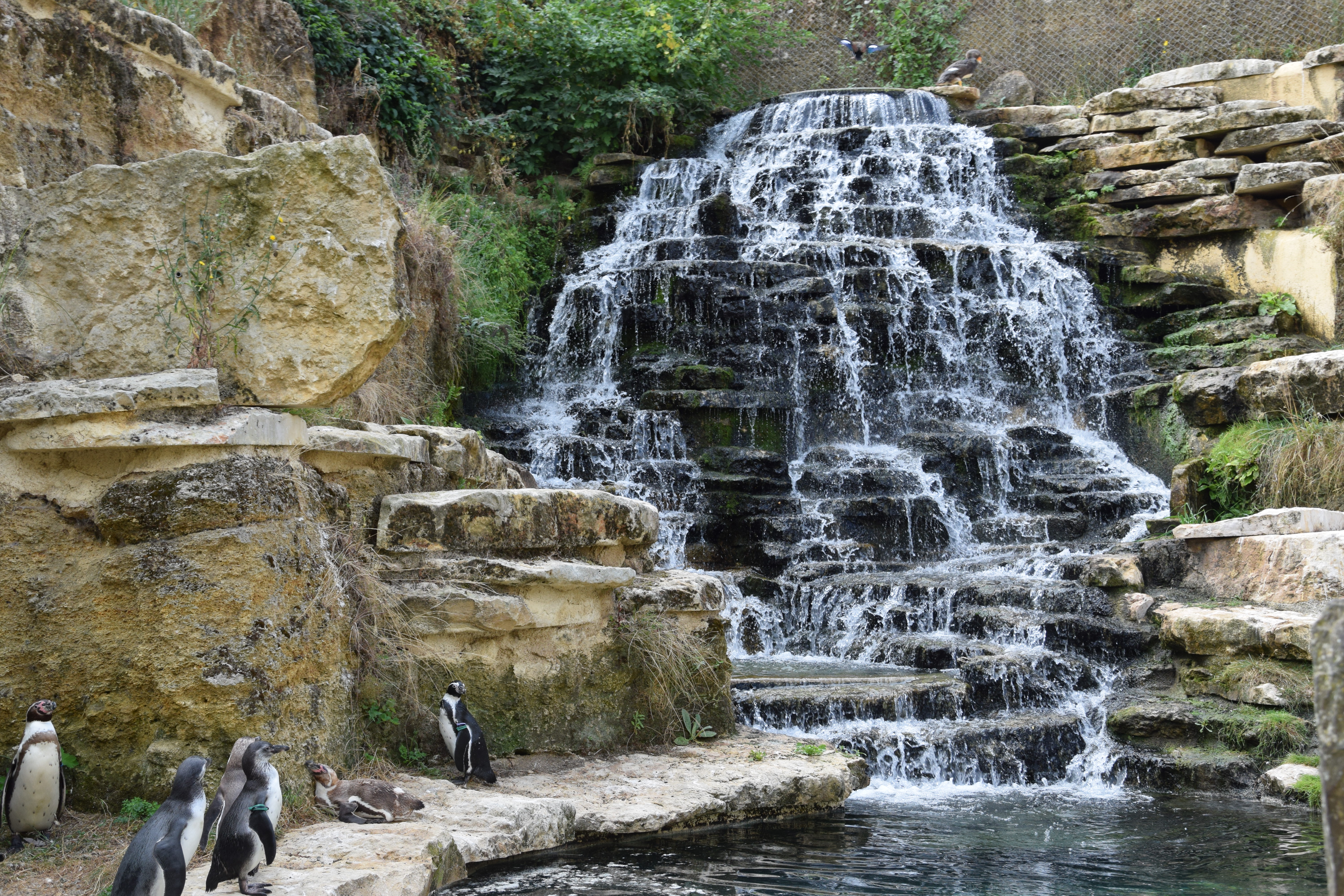
Waterfall with penguins.
