= Doué-en-Anjou =

- Commune
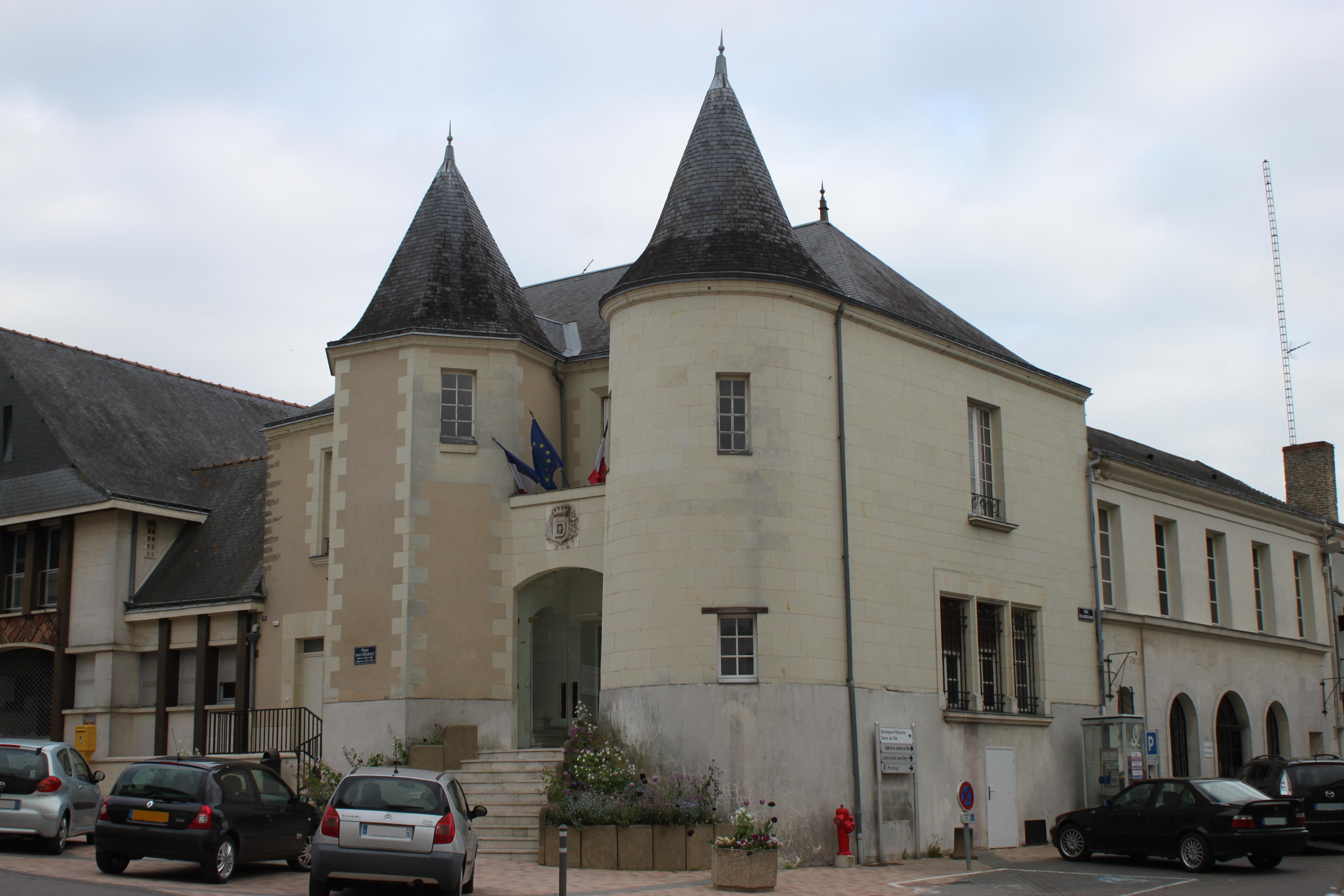
- The town hall of Doué-en-Anjou
- Location of Doué-en-Anjou
- Location within France Location within Pays de la Loire
- Coordinates: 47°11′38″N 0°16′26″W
- Country: France
- Region: Pays de la Loire
- Department: Maine-et-Loire
- Arrondissement: Saumur
- Canton: Doué-en-Anjou
- Intercommunality: CA Saumur Val de Loire

Government
  - Mayor (2020–2026): Michel Pattée
- Area^{1}: 148.55 km^{2} (57.36 sq mi)
- Population (2023): 11,029
  - Density: 74.244/km^{2} (192.29/sq mi)
- Time zone: UTC+01:00 (CET)
  - Summer (DST): UTC+02:00 (CEST)
- INSEE/Postal code: 49125 /49700
- ^{1} French Land Register data, which excludes lakes, ponds, glaciers > 1 km^{2} (0.386 sq mi or 247 acres) and river estuaries.

Doué-en-Anjou (French pronunciation: [dwe ɑ̃.n‿ɑ̃ʒu], literally Doué in Anjou) is a commune in the Maine-et-Loire department of western France. The municipality was established on 30 December 2016 and consists of the former communes of Brigné, Concourson-sur-Layon, Doué-la-Fontaine, Forges, Meigné, Montfort, Saint-Georges-sur-Layon and Les Verchers-sur-Layon.

== Population ==
Historical population
Year	Pop.	±% p.a.
1968	9,248	—
1975	9,297	+0.08%
1982	9,425	+0.20%
1990	10,079	+0.84%
1999	10,338	+0.28%
2007	10,576	+0.28%
2012	10,942	+0.68%
2017	11,005	+0.11%
2023	11,029	+0.04%
Populations of the area corresponding with the commune of Doué-en-Anjou at 1 January 2025. Source: INSEE

== See also ==
- Communes of the Maine-et-Loire department
