= Marco Doué =

French footballer (born 2000)

Personal information
- Full name: Marc-Olivier Doué Séné
- Date of birth: 11 October 2000 (age 26)
- Place of birth: Bordeaux, France
- Height: 1.85 m (6 ft 1 in)
- Position: Defensive midfielder

Team information
- Current team: Cádiz
- Number: 5

Youth career
- –2018: Bordeaux
- 2018–2020: PEC Zwolle

Senior career*
Years	Team	Apps	(Gls)
2019–2021	PEC Zwolle	7	(0)
2021–2023	Virton	50	(3)
2023–2024	Eldense	9	(0)
2024–2025	Ponferradina	30	(0)
2025–2026	Castellón	34	(3)
2026–	Cádiz	0	(0)
- * Club domestic league appearances and goals as of 23 August 2026

Marc-Olivier "Marco" Doué Séné (born 11 October 2000) is a French professional footballer who plays for Segunda División club Cádiz. Mainly a defensive midfielder, he can also play as a central defender.

== Career ==
On 12 October 2018, Doué signed with the Dutch club PEC Zwolle until June 2021 with an additional one-year extension option. He made his Eredivisie debut for the club on 25 August 2019, in a 2–2 home draw against Sparta Rotterdam.

On 12 August 2021, Doué moved to the Belgian club Virton. He scored his first senior goal on 5 November, netting the opener in a 3–1 away win over Lommel.

On 14 July 2023, Doué signed a two-year contract with CD Eldense, newly promoted to Segunda División. On 29 August of the following year, after featuring rarely, he joined Primera Federación side SD Ponferradina.

On 4 July 2025, Doué returned to the second division after signing a two-year deal with CD Castellón. On 1 September of the following year, he moved to fellow league team Cádiz on a four-year contract.

== Personal life ==
Born in France, Doué is of Ivorian descent. His cousins Guéla and Désiré Doué, and Yann Gboho are also professional footballers.
