= Eddy Doué =

Ivorian footballer (born 2005)

Personal information
- Date of birth: 11 December 2005 (age 20)
- Place of birth: Bangolo, Ivory Coast
- Height: 1.80 m (5 ft 11 in)
- Position: Midfielder

Team information
- Current team: Estrela da Amadora
- Number: 39

Youth career
- –2023: Entente SSG
- 2023–2024: Dunkerque
- 2024–2026: Paris Saint-Germain

Senior career*
Years	Team	Apps	(Gls)
2026–	Estrela da Amadora	21	(1)
- * Club domestic league appearances and goals as of 25 May 2026

Eddy Doué (born 11 December 2005) is an Ivorian professional footballer who plays as a midfielder for Primeira Liga club Estrela da Amadora.

== Club career ==
Having played for Entente SSG and Dunkerque early on, Doué signed for Paris Saint-Germain (PSG) in June 2024 after impressing in a Championnat National U19 match against the club. On 30 June 2025, he signed a one-year professional contract with the club. In the 2025–26 Premier League International Cup with Paris Saint-Germain's under-21s, Doué played in a 3–1 victory over Chelsea, with his performance in the match being highlighted due to a viral social media video.

On 24 January 2026, Doué signed with Portuguese Primeira Liga club Estrela da Amadora, on a contract until June 2028.

== International career ==
Doué was one of players who were called up with the Ivory Coast national team by head coach Hervé Renard for the 2027 Africa Cup of Nations qualification matches against Ghana and Somalia, and the friendly against Cameroon on 24, 29 September and 3 October 2026; respectively.

== Personal life ==
Doué's cousins Désiré and Guéla Doué are also professional footballers.
