= Guéla Doué =

French-Ivorian footballer (born 2002)

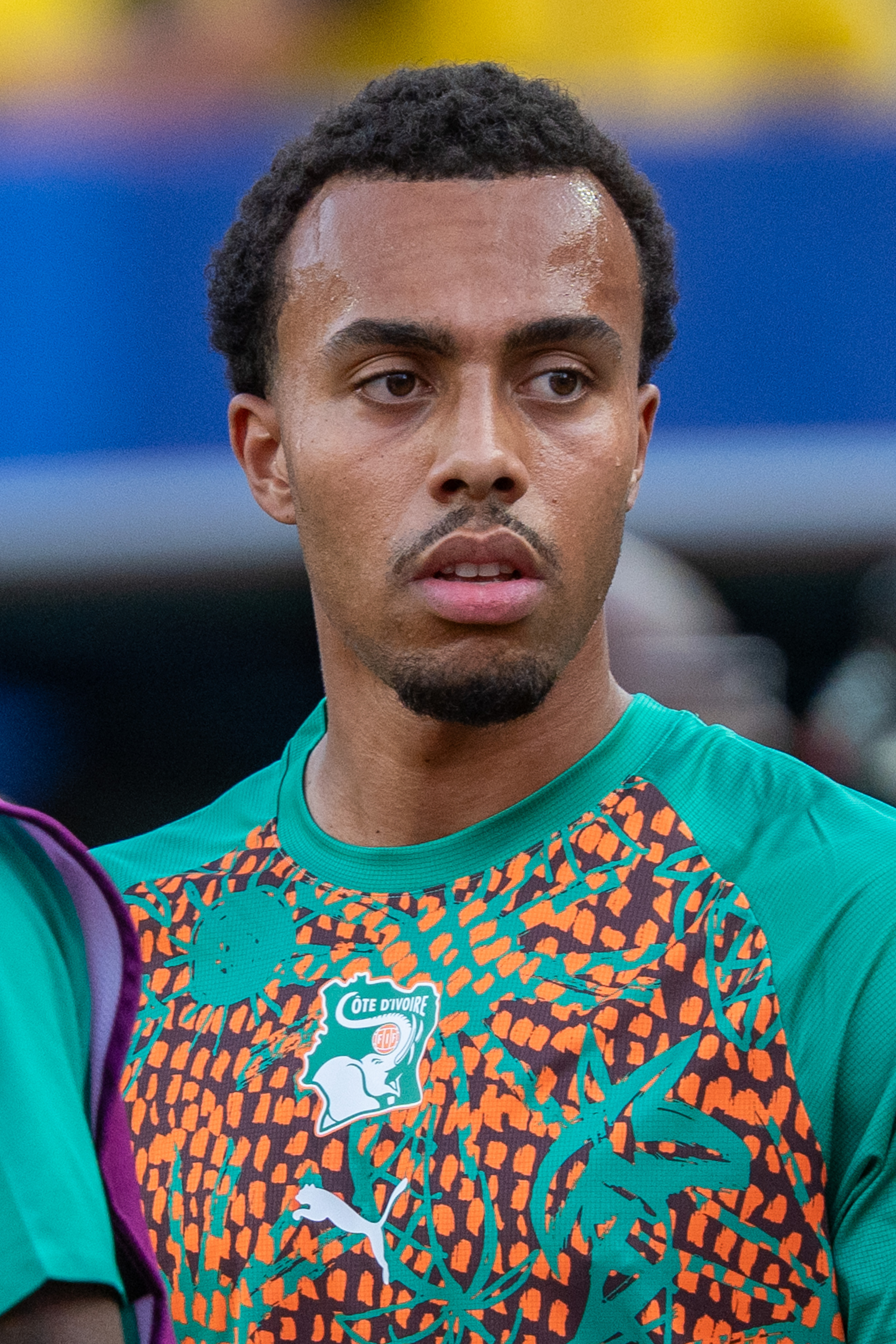
- Doué with the Ivory Coast in 2026

Personal information
- Full name: Guéla Maho-Lewis Doué
- Date of birth: 17 October 2002 (age 24)
- Place of birth: Angers, France
- Height: 1.87 m (6 ft 2 in)
- Positions: Right-back; centre-back; defensive midfielder

Team information
- Current team: Bayer Leverkusen
- Number: 20

Youth career
- 2011–2020: Rennes

Senior career*
| Years | Team | Apps | (Gls) |
| 2020–2023 | Rennes B | 20 | (0) |
| 2023–2024 | Rennes | 26 | (0) |
| 2024–2026 | Strasbourg | 57 | (3) |
| 2026– | Bayer Leverkusen | 1 | (0) |

International career^{‡}
| 2023 | Ivory Coast U23 | 2 | (0) |
| 2024– | Ivory Coast | 24 | (3) |
- * Club domestic league appearances and goals as of 12 September 2026 ‡ National team caps and goals as of 30 June 2026

Guéla Maho-Lewis Doué (born 17 October 2002) is a professional footballer who plays as a right-back for Bundesliga club Bayer Leverkusen. Born in France, he plays for the Ivory Coast national team.

== Club career ==
=== Rennes ===
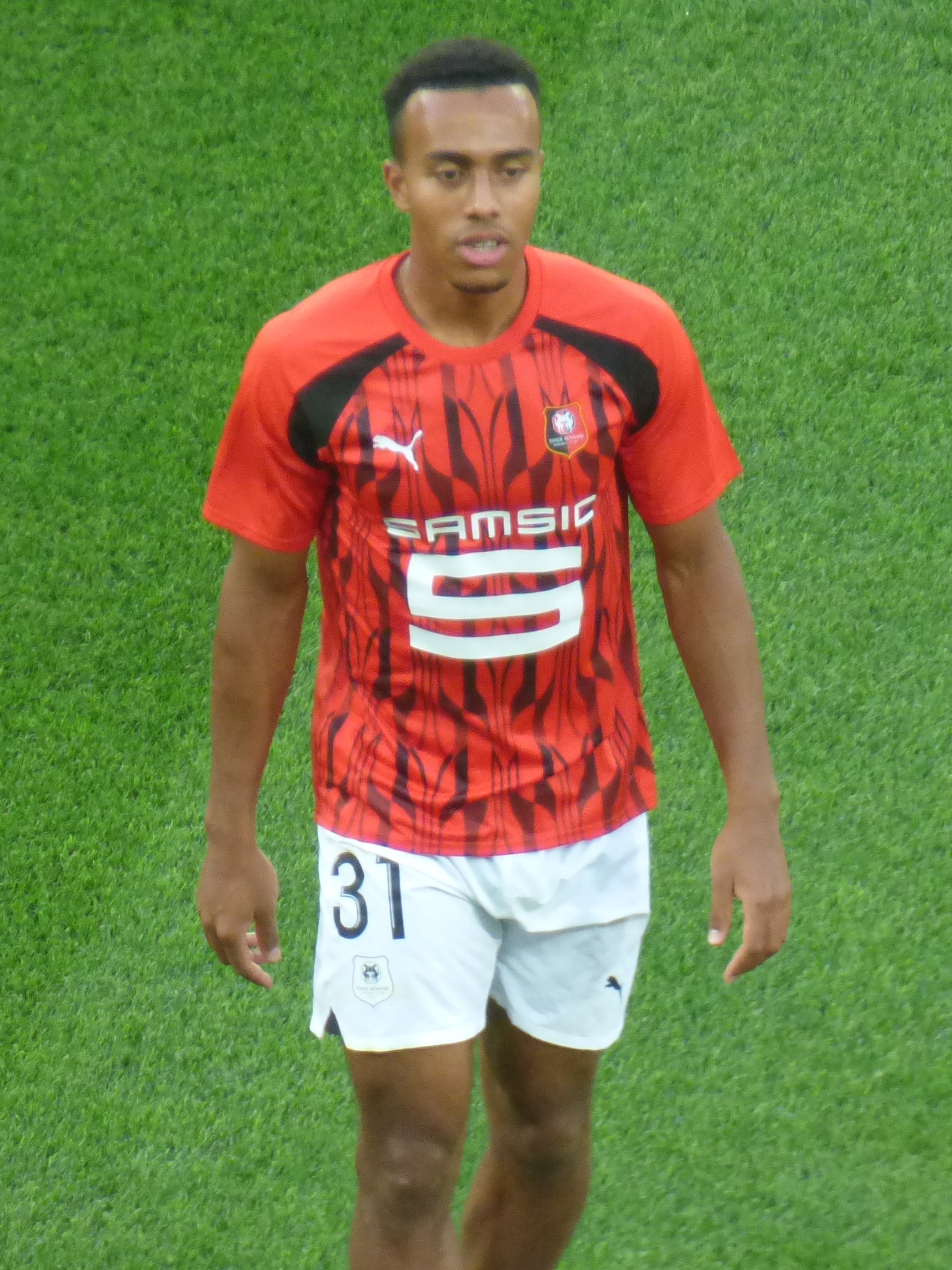
Doué with Rennes in 2023

Having joined Rennes as an eight year old, Guéla Doué was part of a 2002-born generation comprising the likes of Eduardo Camavinga, Brandon Soppy and Georginio Rutter. He began playing with Rennes National 3 reserves in 2020–21.

The young defender signed his first professional contract with the club on 18 November 2021. His progress through the 2021–22 season was however halted by a serious injury, making his way back with the reserve only in May 2022, still managing to help them winning promotion to the National 2 after only narrowly topping the Brittany group.

Doué made his first team debut during the 2022 summer friendlies, joining his brother Désiré on the field against Caen.

Having already appeared several times on the bench in Ligue 1 under Bruno Génésio's management, on 17 January 2023 Guéla extended his contract with the club until 2025.

He made his senior debut with Rennes in a 3–0 league win over Strasbourg on 1 February 2023, coming in as a late substitute for his younger brother, who had just become the youngest ever player to deliver an assist and score a goal in a Ligue 1 game.

=== Strasbourg ===
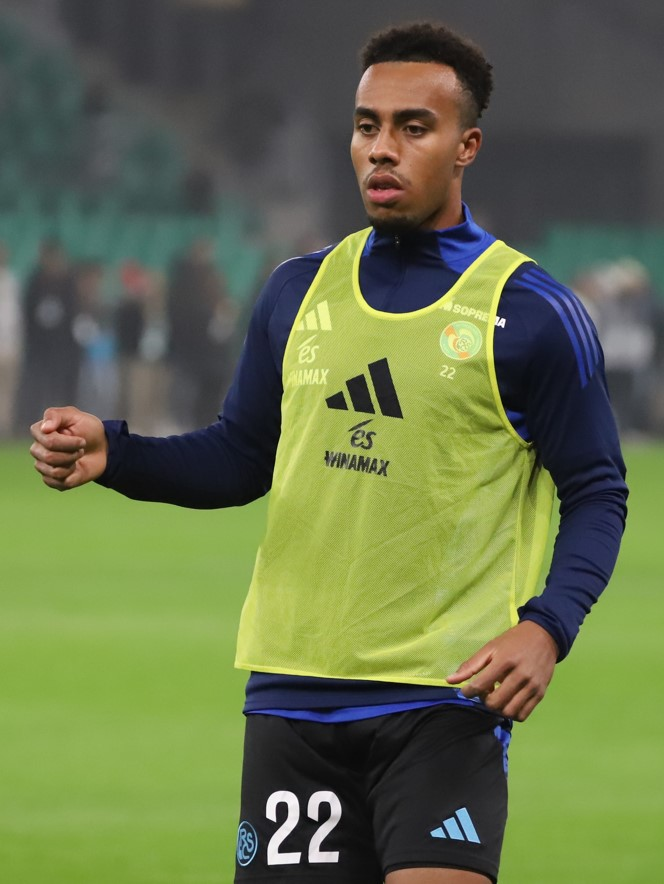
Doué training with Strasbourg in 2025

On 26 July 2024, Doué joined Strasbourg by signing a contract until 2029. On 18 August, he made his debut in the Ligue 1 opener against Montpellier, which ended in a 1–1 draw. On 9 November, he scored the first goal of his professional career in a 1–3 defeat against Monaco.

=== Bayer Leverkusen ===
On 1 September 2026, Doué joined Bundesliga side Bayer Leverkusen on a five-year deal.

== International career ==
Doué was born in France, to an Ivorian father and French mother. He holds dual-citizenship and holds Ivorian by descent. He was called up to the Ivory Coast U23s for a set of matches in March 2023.

Doué made his debut for the senior Ivory Coast national team on 23 March 2024 in a friendly against Benin.

Three days later, he scored his first national team goal, the winner in the 84th minute in a 2–1 friendly victory over Uruguay.

Doué was included in the list of Ivorian players selected by coach Emerse Faé to participate in the 2025 Africa Cup of Nations.

On 15 May 2026, Doué was integrated by Ivory Coast coach Emerse Faé in his list of 26 players in order to participate in the 2026 FIFA World Cup.

== Personal life ==
Doué's younger brother Désiré, and his cousins Yann Gboho, Marc-Olivier Doué, and Eddy Doué are also professional footballers.

== Career statistics ==
=== Club ===
As of match played 12 September 2026

Appearances and goals by club, season and competition
| Club | Season | League | | | National cup | | Continental | | Other | | Total | |
| Club | Season | Division | Apps | Goals | Apps | Goals | Apps | Goals | Apps | Goals | Apps | Goals |
|---|---|---|---|---|---|---|---|---|---|---|---|---|
| Rennes B | 2020–21 | CFA 2 | 3 | 0 | — | | — | | — | | 3 | 0 |
| Rennes B | 2021–22 | CFA 2 | 3 | 0 | — | | — | | — | | 3 | 0 |
| Rennes B | 2022–23 | CFA 2 | 12 | 0 | — | | — | | — | | 12 | 0 |
| Rennes B | 2023–24 | CFA 2 | 2 | 0 | — | | — | | — | | 2 | 0 |
| Rennes B | Total | | 20 | 0 | — | | — | | — | | 20 | 0 |
| Rennes | 2022–23 | Ligue 1 | 2 | 0 | 0 | 0 | 0 | 0 | — | | 2 | 0 |
| Rennes | 2023–24 | Ligue 1 | 24 | 0 | 5 | 0 | 4 (Note: Appearances in UEFA Europa League) | 0 | — | | 33 | 0 |
| Rennes | Total | | 26 | 0 | 5 | 0 | 4 | 0 | — | | 35 | 0 |
| Strasbourg | 2024–25 | Ligue 1 | 32 | 1 | 2 | 0 | — | | — | | 34 | 1 |
| Strasbourg | 2025–26 | Ligue 1 | 24 | 2 | 2 | 0 | 8 (Note: Appearances in UEFA Conference League) | 0 | — | | 34 | 2 |
| Strasbourg | 2026–27 | Ligue 1 | 1 | 0 | — | | — | | — | | 1 | 0 |
| Strasbourg | Total | | 57 | 3 | 4 | 0 | 8 | 0 | — | | 69 | 3 |
| Bayer Leverkusen | 2026–27 | Bundesliga | 1 | 0 | 0 | 0 | 0 | 0 | — | | 1 | 0 |
| Career total | | | 104 | 3 | 9 | 0 | 12 | 0 | 0 | 0 | 125 | 3 |

=== International ===
As of match played 30 June 2026

Appearances and goals by national team and year
| National team | Year | Apps | Goals |
|---|---|---|---|
| Ivory Coast | 2024 | 7 | 1 |
| Ivory Coast | 2025 | 8 | 0 |
| Ivory Coast | 2026 | 9 | 2 |
| Total | | 24 | 3 |

Scores and results list the Ivory Coast's goal tally first, score column indicates score after each Doué goal.

List of international goals scored by Guéla Doué
| No. | Date | Venue | Cap | Opponent | Score | Result | Competition |
|---|---|---|---|---|---|---|---|
| 1 | 26 March 2024 | Stade Bollaert-Delelis, Lens, France | 2 | Uruguay | 2–1 | 2–1 | Friendly |
| 2 | 10 January 2026 | Adrar Stadium, Agadir, Morocco | 17 | Egypt | 2–3 | 2–3 | 2025 Africa Cup of Nations |
| 3 | 4 June 2026 | Stade de la Beaujoire, Nantes, France | 20 | France | 1–1 | 2–1 | Friendly |
