= Désiré Doué =

French footballer (born 2005)

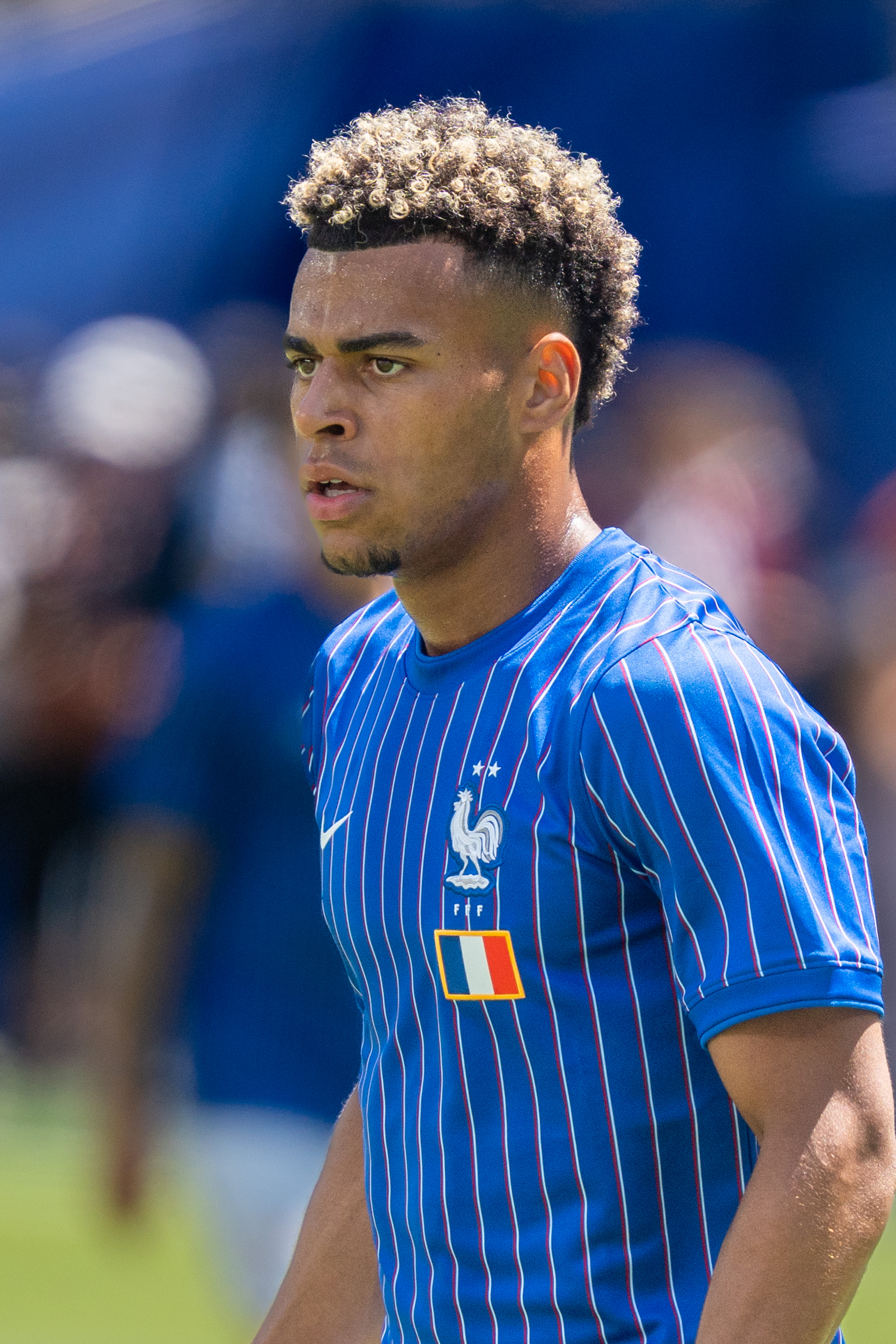
- Doué with France in 2026

Personal information
- Full name: Désiré Nonka-Maho Doué
- Date of birth: 3 June 2005 (age 21)
- Place of birth: Angers, Maine-et-Loire, France
- Height: 1.81 m (5 ft 11 in)
- Positions: Attacking midfielder; winger

Team information
- Current team: Paris Saint-Germain
- Number: 14

Youth career
- 2011–2021: Rennes

Senior career*
Years	Team	Apps	(Gls)
2021–2023	Rennes II	11	(1)
2022–2024	Rennes	57	(7)
2024–	Paris Saint-Germain	64	(15)

International career^{‡}
2021–2022	France U17	17	(7)
2022–2023	France U19	12	(3)
2023–2024	France U21	4	(1)
2024	France Olympic	10	(3)
2025–	France	20	(4)
Medal record
Men's football
Representing France
UEFA Nations League
Third place	2025 Germany
Olympic Games
Silver medal – second place	2024 Paris	Team
UEFA European Under-17 Championship
Winner	2022 Israel
- * Club domestic league appearances and goals as of 21:21, 21 November 2026 (UTC) ‡ National team caps and goals as of 22:22, 12 November 2026 (UTC)

Désiré Nonka-Maho Doué (French pronunciation: [deziʁe dwe, -due]; born 3 June 2005) is a French professional footballer who plays as an attacking midfielder or winger for Ligue 1 club Paris Saint-Germain and the France national team. He is considered one of the best young players in the world.

Doué started his career at Rennes, spending two seasons in Ligue 1. In 2024, he joined reigning French champions PSG in a transfer worth €50 million. In his debut season for PSG, Doué was a prominent player as the club attained a continental treble, including their first-ever UEFA Champions League title. His performances also earned him the Ligue 1 Young Player of the Year award, the Champions League's Young Player of the Season, and the Golden Boy. The following season, he helped PSG win the Ligue 1 and UEFA Champions League for a second consecutive time, earning the Ligue 1 Young Player of the Year award for the second season in a row.

Doué is a former France youth international, representing his country at various youth levels and the Olympic team in 2024, where he won a silver medal. He made his senior debut for France in March 2025, and was a part of their squad at the 2026 FIFA World Cup.

== Club career ==
=== Rennes ===
Doué began playing football with the youth academy of Rennes at the age of five in 2011. He began his senior career with their reserves in 2021, and started training with the senior side in February 2021. On 14 April 2022, he signed his first professional contract with the club until 2024.

On 7 August 2022, Doué made his professional debut for Rennes as a substitute in a 1–0 Ligue 1 defeat at home to Lorient. On 31 August, he scored his first professional goal in a 3–1 league win at home over Brest, becoming the first player born in 2005 to score in any of the major five European leagues. On 6 October, Doué scored an 89th-minute winning goal for Rennes in a 2–1 UEFA Europa League home victory over Dynamo Kyiv, his first European goal. The goal made him the youngest ever French scorer in European club competitions at 17 years, four months and four days of age. On 9 October, Doué scored a half-volley in the Derby Breton against Nantes, sealing a 3–0 win less than 60 seconds after coming on as a substitute in the 83rd minute. On 2 November, Doué extended this contract with Rennes for another year until 2025.

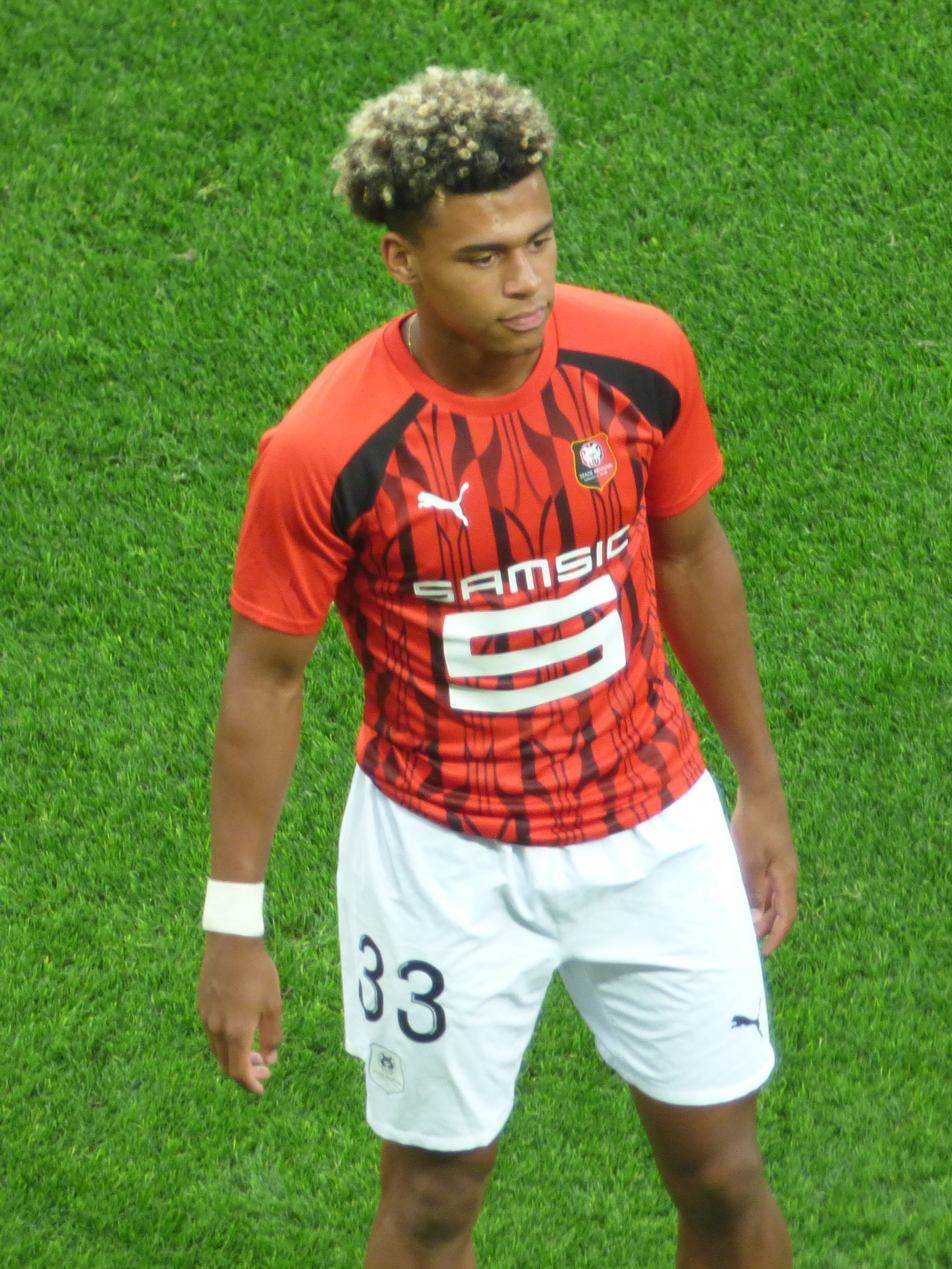
Doué with Rennes in 2023

On 9 April 2023, Doué found himself substituted out in the final minutes of the 3–1 defeat against Lyon after being introduced from the bench 18 minutes earlier. Rennes manager Bruno Génésio was critical of the midfielder in his post-match comments, but also gave him encouragement: "It does not mean I don’t have great trust in him and that he’ll fail to make a great career, but some things need to be understood faster". Doué finished the 2022–23 season in Ligue 1 with 29 appearances, 11 of which as a starter.

On 1 October 2023, Doué scored his first goal in the 2023–24 Ligue 1 season in a 3–1 win against Nantes. On 26 January 2024, against Lyon, he assisted Rennes' first goal by Martin Terrier, and scored the second in a 3–2 win, playing as a left winger.

=== Paris Saint-Germain ===
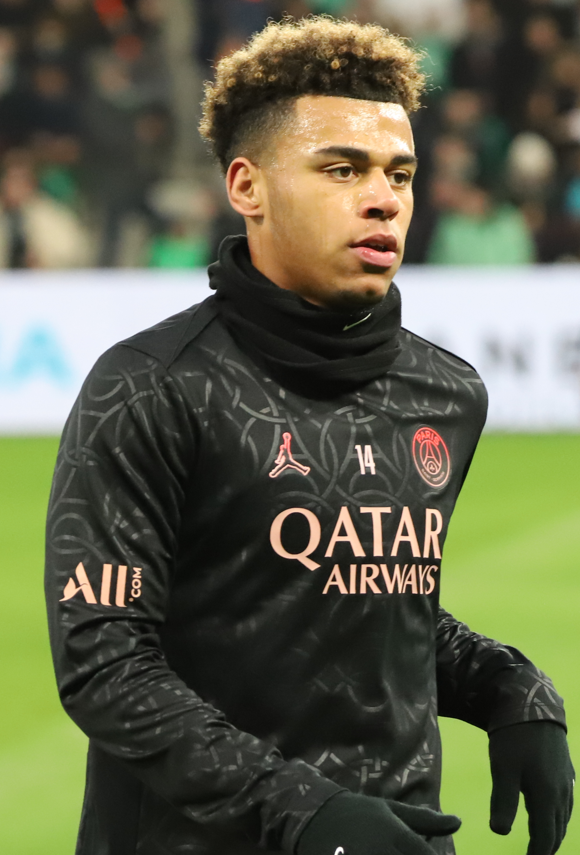
Doué training with Paris Saint-Germain in 2025

On 17 August 2024, Doué joined fellow Ligue 1 club Paris Saint-Germain in a transfer worth €50 million, not including bonuses. He signed a contract valid until 30 June 2029. In doing so, he rejected an offer from German club Bayern Munich.

==== 2024–25: Young Player of the Season and European champion ====
On 23 August, Doué made his debut for the reigning French champions as a substitute in a 6–0 win over Montpellier, wearing the number 14 shirt. In the post-match interview, Doué stated that he didn't regret his decision to sign for PSG instead of Bayern. In the next match on 1 September, he recorded his first assist for PSG, a cross for a Randal Kolo Muani header to seal a 3–1 victory over Lille. On 18 September, Doué made his UEFA Champions League debut at the Parc des Princes against Spanish side Girona. On 10 December, he scored his first Champions League goal in a 3–0 away win over Red Bull Salzburg. On 15 December, he was given his first man of the match award in Ligue 1 as a PSG player for his performance in a 3–1 home win against Lyon, where he provided the assist for Ousmane Dembélé's opening goal and won a penalty in the second half, which was converted by Vitinha. On 19 February 2025, Doué came on as a substitute in the second leg of a Champions League knockout phase play-off against fellow Ligue 1 club Brest, where he scored a goal and provided an assist in an eventual 7–0 win for PSG.

Doué's stature in the PSG squad continued to grow with impressive performances including a game against Lille on 1 March, where he got a goal and an assist. On 11 March, in the second leg of the Champions League round of 16 away tie against Liverpool, Doué came on as a substitute for Bradley Barcola and scored the decisive penalty at Anfield that won the Parisians the tie in a second leg comeback, after having lost the first leg 1–0. His performances in March, in which he scored three goals and recorded two assists in four Ligue 1 matches, saw him named UNFP Player of the Month. On 5 April, Doué scored the only goal in a 1–0 victory over Angers, securing his club's 13th Ligue 1 title. Four days later, he scored the equalizer in the Champions League quarter-final first leg against Aston Villa from outside the box, with PSG going on to win the tie 5–4 on aggregate to advance to the semi-final stage. He went on feature as PSG's starting right winger in both legs of the semi-final against Arsenal as PSG reached the second Champions League final in the club's history with a 3–1 aggregate win over the London club. At the end of the league season, he was named as both the Young Player of the Year and in the Ligue 1 Team of the Year at the 2025 UNFP awards.

On 31 May, Doué scored twice and provided an assist to Achraf Hakimi in a 5–0 win over Inter Milan in the Champions League final, being awarded Man of the Match, as his club secured their first-ever title in the competition. In addition, he became the first ever teenager to score a brace in the final at the age of 19 years and 362 days, surpassing Eusébio's record, aged 20 years and 97 days, set in 1962, as well as the youngest assist provider in a final, overtaking Jude Bellingham's record (aged 20 years and 338 days) from the previous season. He also became the second teenager to score a goal and assist in a final since Brian Kidd in 1968 and the first player with 3 goal involvements in a final since Sandro Mazzola in 1964. Due to his impressive performances, Doué was named the UEFA Champions League Young Player of the Season.

On 6 June, in the quarter-finals of the 2025 FIFA Club World Cup, Doué scored the first goal against Bayern Munich to help PSG advance to the semifinals of tournament. Although his team lost in the final against Chelsea, he was awarded the Best Young Player of the tournament.

==== 2025–present: Continuous European success ====
During the 2025–26 season, Doué was named Ligue 1 Young Player of the Year for the second time, having recorded seven goals and five assists. He was also part of the team that secured their second Champions League title in a row following a penalty shootout victory over Arsenal in the final. On 12 August 2026, he scored the winning goal in a 2–1 victory over Aston Villa, helping his club claim their second successive UEFA Super Cup title.

== International career ==
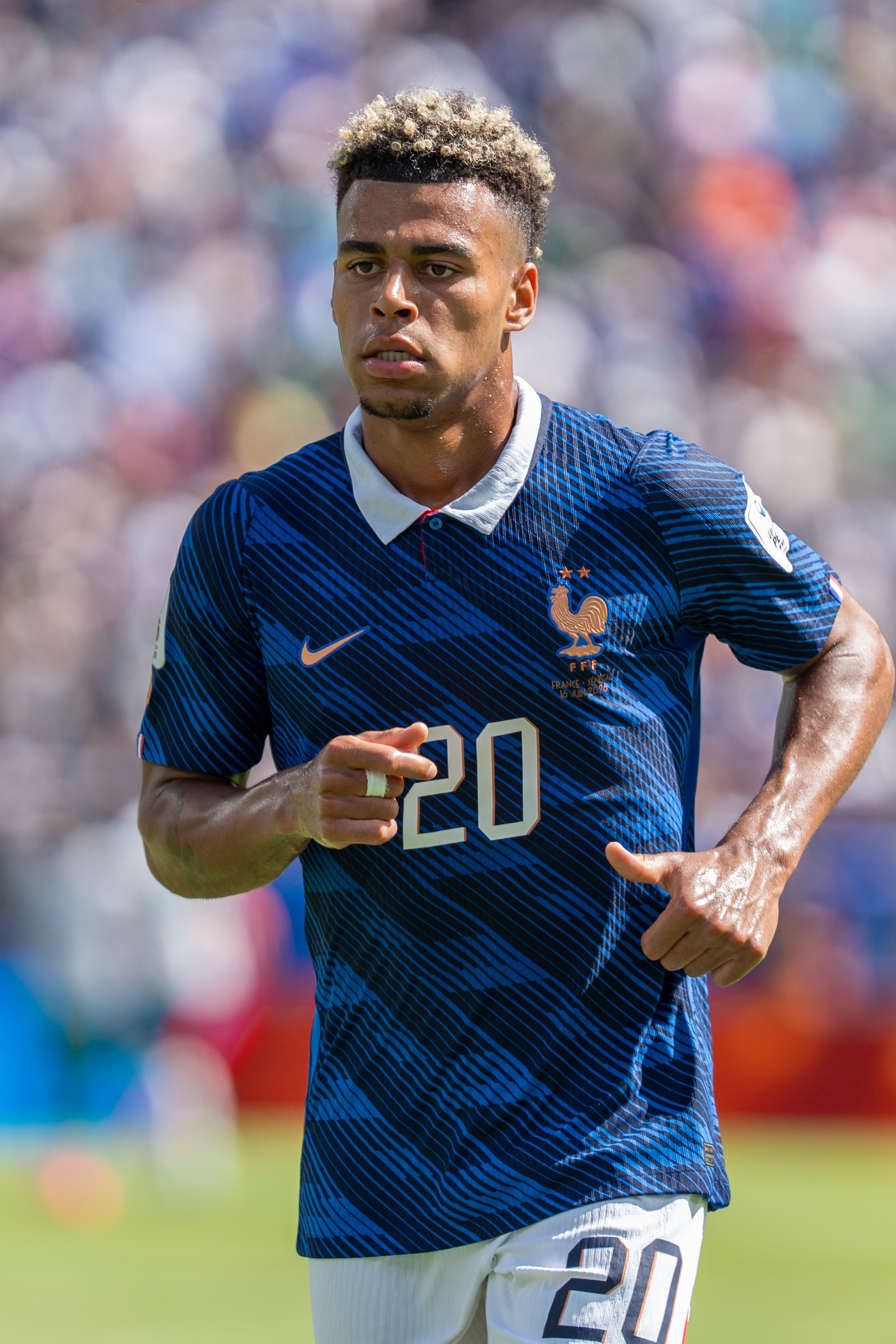
Doué playing for France at the 2026 FIFA World Cup

Doué was a youth international for France, having represented the France U17s and France U19s. He played for the U17s in their winning campaign at the 2022 UEFA European Under-17 Championship and the U19s in the 2024 UEFA European Under-19 Championship qualifiers. Doué debuted for the France under-21 team on 13 October 2023 in the UEFA European under-21 championship qualifying match against Bosnia and Herzegovina, where he picked up two yellow cards and was sent off before the final whistle.

On 22 March 2024, Doué made his debut for the France Olympic football team in a friendly match against Ivory Coast, scoring two goals in a 3–2 win. He played in five matches at the 2024 Olympic games, including a notable appearance from the bench in the final against Spain, which France lost 5–3, having to settle for the runner-up position in the tournament it hosted.

On 13 March 2025, Doué received his first call-up to the France national team and made his debut in the 2024–25 UEFA Nations League quarter-final against Croatia. He received the bronze medal for getting 3rd place after a 2–0 victory against Germany. He played a total of 138 minutes in the tournament.

On 29 March 2026, Doué scored his first and second international goals in a friendly against Colombia. On 14 May, Doué was selected in the 26-man squad for the 2026 FIFA World Cup. He scored his first World Cup goal against Norway on 27 June, scoring the last goal of a victory 4–1 in the final game of the group.

== Player profile ==
Considered to be one of the best young players in the world, Doué's natural position is an attacking midfielder, but his versatility allows him to play deeper in midfield, on either wing, or as a forward, depending on the formation. A dynamic box-to-box playmaker with an eye for goal, Doué has been noted for his supreme agility, acceleration and pace, which combined with his excellent dribbling, shooting and passing technique allows him to be a potent offensive threat in a variety of situations. According to journalist Liam Tharme, who analyzed the player for The Athletic, Doué's super-strength is ball carrying, ranking inside the top two percent of central midfielders in the top five European leagues over the 2022–2023 season for progressive carries (3.4 per 90), and the top one percent for successful dribbles (3.9). ESPN describes Doué as "an entertainer at heart, full of tricks and skills designed to shake up opponents". Despite being primarily used as an attacking player, Doué has also been praised for his defensive contribution, demonstrated by his average of more than three tackles per game in Ligue 1, which has placed him in the top six percent of midfielders in the league.

Rennes manager Bruno Génésio has spoken highly of Doué, calling the youngster "physically already equipped" and further complimenting him: "He reads the game very well. Technically, right foot and even left foot, he's complete, with good control on both. Away from the pitch he's a dream. Easy, calm, with a streak of leadership whilst still asking for advice. He's both care-free and conscientious in his work. He's already a pro in his head". Veteran midfielder Nemanja Matić who signed for Rennes in the summer of 2023 stated that Doué has great potential.

Doué has also drawn comparisons to former PSG player Neymar, particularly after his arrival at the French club, where he has been cited as the Brazilian's heir due to his creativity, flair, dribbling prowess and eye for goal. PSG manager Luis Enrique has praised Doué for his "technical ability, physicality, and personality".

== Personal life ==
Doué was born in Angers, Maine-et-Loire, to an Ivorian father and French mother. He holds French and Ivorian citizenships. His brother Guéla Doué and his cousins Yann Gboho, Marc-Olivier Doué, and Eddy Doué are also professional footballers. His uncle and godfather Noumandiez Doué was a former Ivorian international referee.

Doué is a Christian. After winning the UEFA Champions League with PSG in 2026, he said, "I thank my Lord and Saviour Jesus Christ. That's what my prayer was — to win the Champions League again."

Doué has recognised both Neymar and Lionel Messi as his footballing idols.

== Career statistics ==
=== Club ===
As of match played 21 November 2026

Appearances and goals by club, season and competition
Club	Season	League			Coupe de France		Europe		Other		Total	
Club	Season	Division	Apps	Goals	Apps	Goals	Apps	Goals	Apps	Goals	Apps	Goals
Rennes II	2021–22	National 3	10	1	—		—		—		10	1
Rennes II	2022–23	National 3	1	0	—		—		—		1	0
Rennes II	Total		11	1	—		—		—		11	1
Rennes	2022–23	Ligue 1	26	3	1	0	7 (Note: Appearances in UEFA Europa League)	1	—		34	4
Rennes	2023–24	Ligue 1	31	4	5	0	6	0	—		42	4
Rennes	Total		57	7	6	0	13	1	—		76	8
Paris Saint-Germain	2024–25	Ligue 1	31	6	6	4	16 (Note: Appearances in UEFA Champions League)	5	8 (Note: One appearance in Trophée des Champions, seven appearances and one goal in FIFA Club World Cup)	1	61	16
Paris Saint-Germain	2025–26	Ligue 1	23	7	2	1	13	5	3 (Note: One appearance in UEFA Super Cup, one appearance in FIFA Intercontinental Cup, one appearance in Trophée des Champions)	0	41	13
Paris Saint-Germain	2026–27	Ligue 1	10	2	0	0	3	3	2 (Note: One appearance and one goal in UEFA Super Cup, one appearance in Trophée des Champions)	1	15	6
Paris Saint-Germain	Total		64	15	8	5	32	13	13	2	117	35
Career total			132	23	14	5	45	14	13	2	204	45

=== International ===
As of match played 12 November 2026

Appearances and goals by national team and year
National team	Year	Apps	Goals
France	2025	4	0
France	2026	16	4
Total		20	4

As of match played 5 October 2026
Scores and results list France's goal tally first, score column indicates score after each Doué goal

List of international goals scored by Désiré Doué
No.	Date	Venue	Cap	Opponent	Score	Result	Competition	Ref.
1	29 March 2026	Northwest Stadium, Landover, United States	6	Colombia	1–0	3–1	Friendly	
2	29 March 2026	Northwest Stadium, Landover, United States	6	Colombia	3–0	3–1	Friendly	
3	26 June 2026	Gillette Stadium, Foxborough, United States	10	Norway	4–1	4–1	2026 FIFA World Cup	
4	5 October 2026	Stade de France, Saint-Denis, France	19	Belgium	1–1	4–1	2026–27 UEFA Nations League A	

== Honours ==
Paris Saint-Germain

- Ligue 1: 2024–25, 2025–26
- Coupe de France: 2024–25
- Trophée des Champions: 2024, 2025
- UEFA Champions League: 2024–25, 2025–26
- UEFA Super Cup: 2025, 2026
- FIFA Intercontinental Cup: 2025
- FIFA Club World Cup runner-up: 2025

France U17

- UEFA European Under-17 Championship: 2022

France U23

- Summer Olympics silver medal: 2024

France

- UEFA Nations League third place: 2024–25

Individual

- Golden Boy: 2025
- Globe Soccer Awards Emerging Player of the Year: 2025
- IFFHS The World Youth (U20) Team: 2025
- UNFP Ligue 1 Player of the Month: March 2025
- Ligue 1 Young Player of the Year: 2024–25, 2025–26
- UNFP Ligue 1 Team of the Year: 2024–25
- UEFA Champions League Young Player of the Season: 2024–25
- UEFA Champions League Team of the Season: 2024–25
- FIFA Club World Cup Best Young Player: 2025

Orders

- Knight of the National Order of Merit: 2024
