= Canton of Doué-en-Anjou =

Admin division of a western French department

Coordinates: 47.19°N 0.28°W

The canton of Doué-en-Anjou (before March 2020: canton of Doué-la-Fontaine) is an administrative division of the Maine-et-Loire department, in western France. It was created at the French canton reorganisation which came into effect in March 2015. Its seat is in Doué-en-Anjou.

It consists of the following communes:

1. Antoigné
2. Bellevigne-les-Châteaux
3. Brissac Loire Aubance (partly)
4. Brossay
5. Cizay-la-Madeleine
6. Le Coudray-Macouard
7. Courchamps
8. Dénezé-sous-Doué
9. Doué-en-Anjou
10. Épieds
11. Gennes-Val-de-Loire (partly)
12. Louresse-Rochemenier
13. Montreuil-Bellay
14. Le Puy-Notre-Dame
15. Saint-Just-sur-Dive
16. Saint-Macaire-du-Bois
17. Tuffalun
18. Les Ulmes
19. Vaudelnay
