= Canton of Montfaucon-Montigné =

Coordinates: 47°05′33″N 1°04′59″W

Montfaucon-Montigné
- Former canton
- Interactive map of Montfaucon-Montigné
- Country: France
- Region: Pays de la Loire
- Department: Maine-et-Loire
- No. of communes: {{{nbcomm}}}
- Disbanded: 2015
- Area: 230 km^{2} (89 sq mi)
- Population (2012): 26,435
  - Density: 110/km^{2} (300/sq mi)

Canton of Montfaucon-Montigné is a former canton of France, located in the Maine-et-Loire département, in the Pays de la Loire région. It had 26,435 inhabitants (2012). It was disbanded following the French canton reorganisation which came into effect in March 2015. It consisted of 11 communes, which joined the new canton of Saint-Macaire-en-Mauges in 2015.

The canton comprised the following communes:

1. Montfaucon-Montigné
2. Le Longeron
3. La Renaudière
4. La Romagne
5. Roussay
6. Saint-André-de-la-Marche
7. Saint-Crespin-sur-Moine
8. Saint-Germain-sur-Moine
9. Saint-Macaire-en-Mauges
10. Tillières
11. Torfou

== See also ==
- Arrondissement of Cholet
- Cantons of the Maine-et-Loire department
- Communes of the Maine-et-Loire department
