= Torfou =

Torfou may refer to:

- Torfou, Maine-et-Loire, a commune of the Pays de la Loire region of France
- Torfou, Essonne, a commune of the Île-de-France region
