= Montfaucon =

Montfaucon may refer to:

== People ==
- Montfaucon family, a noble family of Franche-Comté (11th–14th centuries), counts of Montbéliard from 1162
- Amadeus II of Montfaucon (1130–1195), lord of Montfaucon and count of Montbéliard
- Bernard de Montfaucon (1655–1741), French monk, early palaeographer and archaeologist
- Henry of Montfaucon (before 1318–1367), lord of Montfaucon and count of Montbéliard
- Stephen of Montfaucon (1325–1397), lord of Montfaucon and count of Montbéliard

== Places ==
=== Switzerland ===
- Montfaucon, Switzerland, in the canton of Jura

=== France ===
- Montfaucon, Aisne, in the Aisne département
- Montfaucon, Doubs, in the Doubs département
- Montfaucon, Gard, in the Gard département
- Montfaucon, Lot, in the Lot département
- Montfaucon-d'Argonne, in the Meuse département
- Montfaucon-en-Velay, in the Haute-Loire département
- Montfaucon-Montigné, in the Maine-et-Loire département
  - Canton of Montfaucon-Montigné

== Other uses ==
- Battle of Montfaucon or Meuse-Argonne Offensive, World War I battle
- Gibbet of Montfaucon, the gibbet of the kings of France from the 13th century to 1760
- Montfaucon American Monument, commemorating a World War I victory, in Lorraine, France

== See also ==
- Monfaucon (disambiguation)
