= Cantons of the Maine-et-Loire department =

The following is a list of the 21 cantons of the Maine-et-Loire department, in France, following the French canton reorganisation which came into effect in March 2015:

- Angers-1
- Angers-2
- Angers-3
- Angers-4
- Angers-5
- Angers-6
- Angers-7
- Beaufort-en-Anjou
- Beaupréau-en-Mauges
- Chalonnes-sur-Loire
- Chemillé-en-Anjou
- Cholet-1
- Cholet-2
- Doué-en-Anjou
- Longué-Jumelles
- Mauges-sur-Loire
- Les Ponts-de-Cé
- Saumur
- Segré-en-Anjou Bleu
- Sèvremoine
- Tiercé
