= Jean Julien Michel Savary =

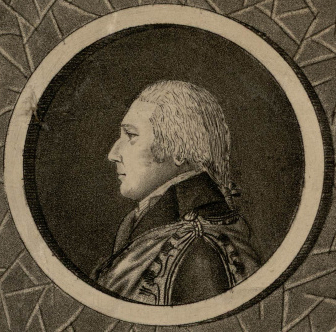

Jean-Julien Savary (18 November 1753 – 27 December 1839) was a French soldier and politician. His first names were given as Jean-Julien-Marie on the covers of his historical works.

== Life ==
Although he was born in Vitré, Jean-Julien-Marie. Savary was thought of as an adopted native of Cholet. He became a lawyer in 1780 and adopted the principles of the French Revolution, taking a very active part in the War in the Vendée. He was president of the tribunal of Cholet from 1790 to 1793.

When the War in the Vendée broke out, the rebels captured Savary. In March 1793, during the First Battle of Cholet, he narrowly escaped death thanks to a petition from the inhabitants of Cholet, then managed to escape. He then became civil commissar to the staff of Canclaux and Kléber. Next he was adjutant-general to the armée de l'Ouest and fought in the Battle of Savenay. After the virée de Galerne he was put in command of Châteaubriant in 1794 and fought against the Chouans.

He opposed the massacres planned by Turreau's infernal columns. At Nantes, he tried to convince Carrier to save the captured Vendéen children, notably at the prison de l'Entrepôt des cafés in the city. His historical works was said by many historians "to be located at the hinge between witness and analysis, succeeding in combining his experience with general Kléber with citations from the archives".

He then began a political career, sitting on the Council of Five Hundred then the Council of the Ancients. He was sub-inspector to the reviews during the Consulate and First French Empire. He was made a knight of the Légion d'honneur on 17 January 1805. He died in Paris on 27 December 1839.

== Works ==
- Jean Julien Michel Savary, Guerres des Vendéens et des Chouans contre la République française, Hachette Bnf, 1824-1827 (ISBN 9782012665361)
- Jean Julien Michel Savary, Mon examen de conscience sur le 18 brumaire an 8 (9 novembre 1799), Hachette Bnf, 2016, 112 p. (ISBN 978-2011306487)

== Bibliography ==
- Joutard, Philippe; Martin, Jean-Clément (2018). Camisards et Vendéens: deux guerres françaises, deux mémoires vivantes (in French). Nîmes: Alcide éditions. ISBN 978-2-37591-031-3.
- (in French) « Jean-Julien Savary », in Adolphe Robert and Gaston Cougny, Dictionnaire des parlementaires français, Edgar Bourloton, 1889-1891
