= Saint-Germain-sur-Moine =

Part of Sèvremoine in Pays de la Loire, France

- Part of Sèvremoine
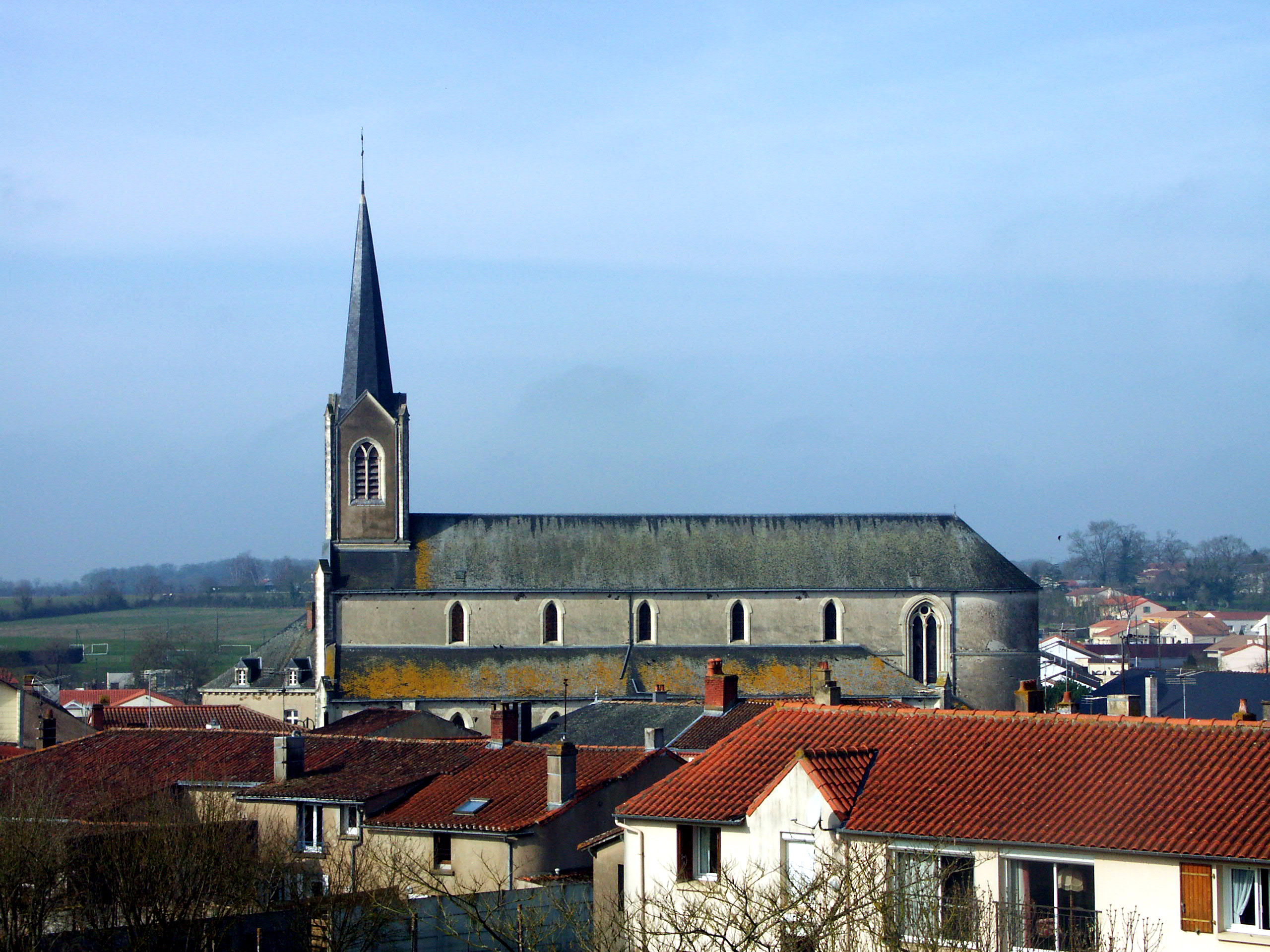
- Location of Saint-Germain-sur-Moine
- Location within France Location within Pays de la Loire
- Coordinates: 47°07′07″N 1°07′18″W
- Country: France
- Region: Pays de la Loire
- Department: Maine-et-Loire
- Arrondissement: Cholet
- Canton: Saint-Macaire-en-Mauges
- Commune: Sèvremoine
- Area^{1}: 26.79 km^{2} (10.34 sq mi)
- Elevation: 75 m (246 ft)
- Population (2022): 2,988
  - Density: 111.5/km^{2} (288.9/sq mi)
- Time zone: UTC+01:00 (CET)
  - Summer (DST): UTC+02:00 (CEST)
- Postal code: 49230
- ^{1} French Land Register data, which excludes lakes, ponds, glaciers > 1 km^{2} (0.386 sq mi or 247 acres) and river estuaries.

Saint-Germain-sur-Moine (French pronunciation: [sɛ̃ ʒɛʁmɛ̃ syʁ mwan]) is a former commune in the Maine-et-Loire department in western France.

== Geography ==
Saint-Germain-sur-Moine is located about 75 meters above sea level and is adjacent to the municipalities of Montfaucon-Montigné and Tillieres. The largest town near Saint-Germain-sur-Moine is the town of Cholet, situated 20 km south-east. The river Moine is the main river that runs through the town of Saint-Germain-sur-Moine.

== History ==
On 15 December 2015, Le Longeron, Montfaucon-Montigné, La Renaudière, Roussay, Saint-André-de-la-Marche, Saint-Crespin-sur-Moine, Saint-Germain-sur-Moine, Saint-Macaire-en-Mauges, Tillières and Torfou merged becoming one commune called Sèvremoine.

== Twinned towns ==
- Lampeter, Wales

== See also ==
- Communes of the Maine-et-Loire department
