= Château de Clisson =

Castle in Pays de la Loire, France

- Clisson, France
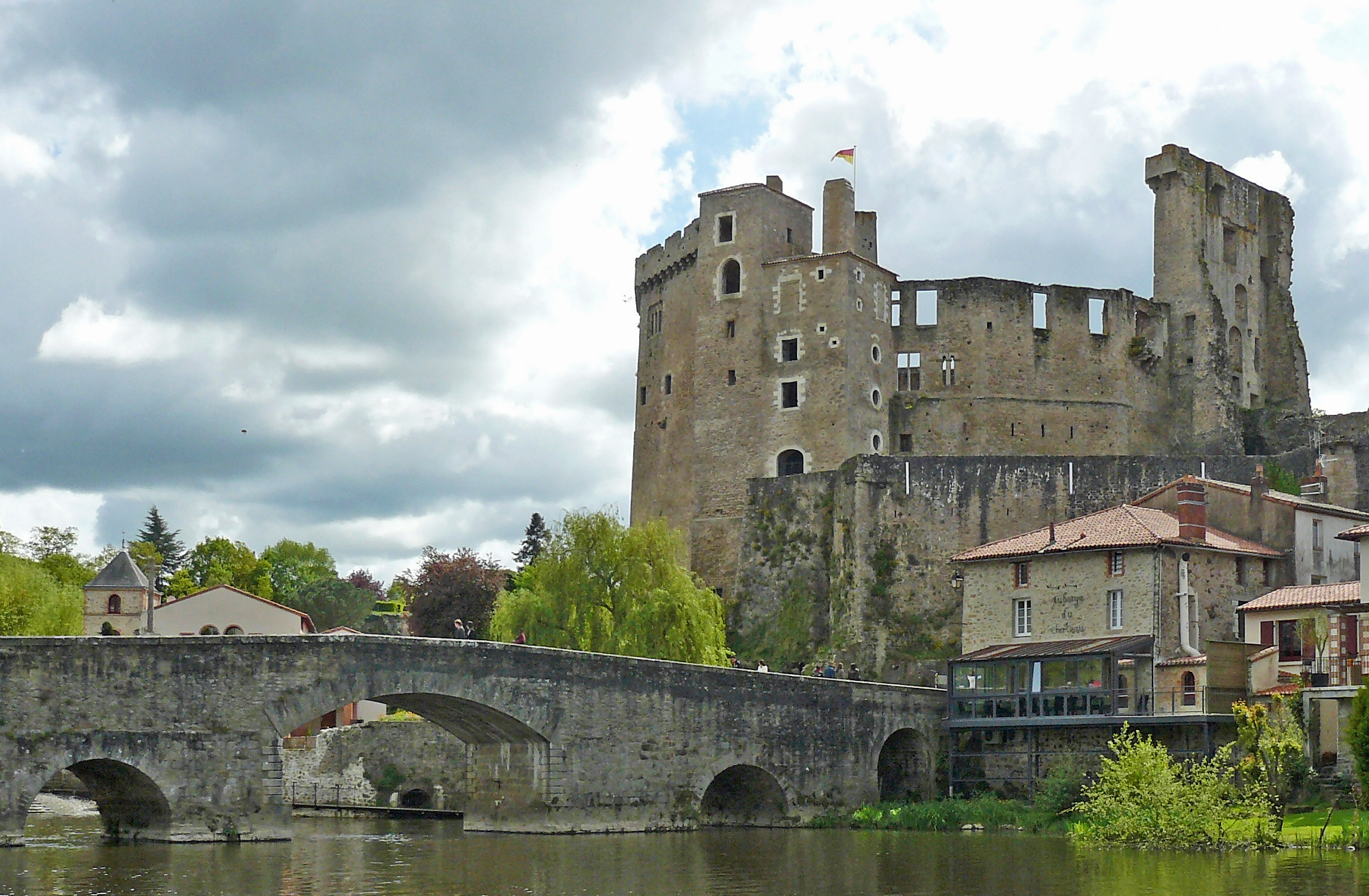
- Château de Clisson

Location
- Coordinates: 47.086439°N 1.280465°W

Flag flown from the main tower of the castle

The Château de Clisson is a castle in the commune of Clisson in the Loire-Atlantique département of France. It stands on the right bank of the Sèvre Nantaise.

== History ==
Within then independent Brittany, the castle, situated at a crossroads for Anjou and Poitou, was one of the great fortified places on the frontiers of the Duchy of Brittany

The first Lords of Clisson occupied the site from the 11th century. They are mentioned for the first time in 1040. Clisson was then the seat of a powerful châtellenie covering 23 parishes.

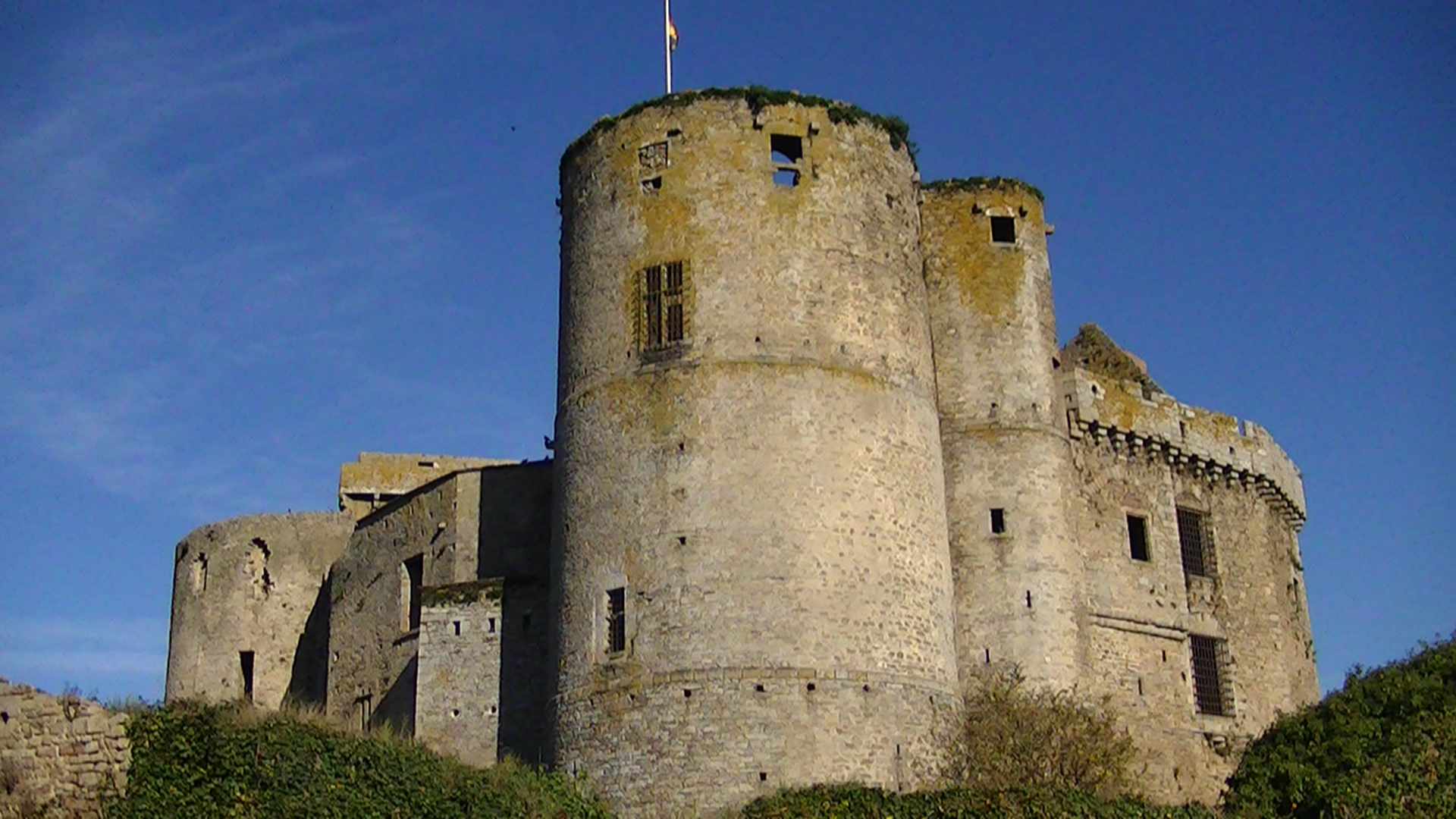
The castle

Most of the present castle was built in the 13th century. Constructed by Guillaume de Clisson, on a rocky outcrop dominating the Sèvre Nantaise, its form at that time was an irregular polygon flanked by round towers and isolated from the rocky plateau by a shallow moat. In the 14th century, Olivier III de Clisson incorporated the gatehouse into a massive quadrilangular keep. The two semicircular towers of the gatehouse collapsed in the 17th century. The castle became the setting for the turbulent lives of Olivier IV de Clisson and Olivier V de Clisson, named Constable of France in succession to Du Guesclin in 1380. The castle is said to be haunted by Jeanne de Clisson wife of Olivier IV.

In the 15th century, the fortifications were modernised to permit the use of artillery. In the second half of the century, the former entrance was modified and the curtain wall was extended and completed by a barbican. At the same time, the castle was enlarged to the west with a new rectangular enclosure nearly 100 m long, armed with towers with artillery casemates.

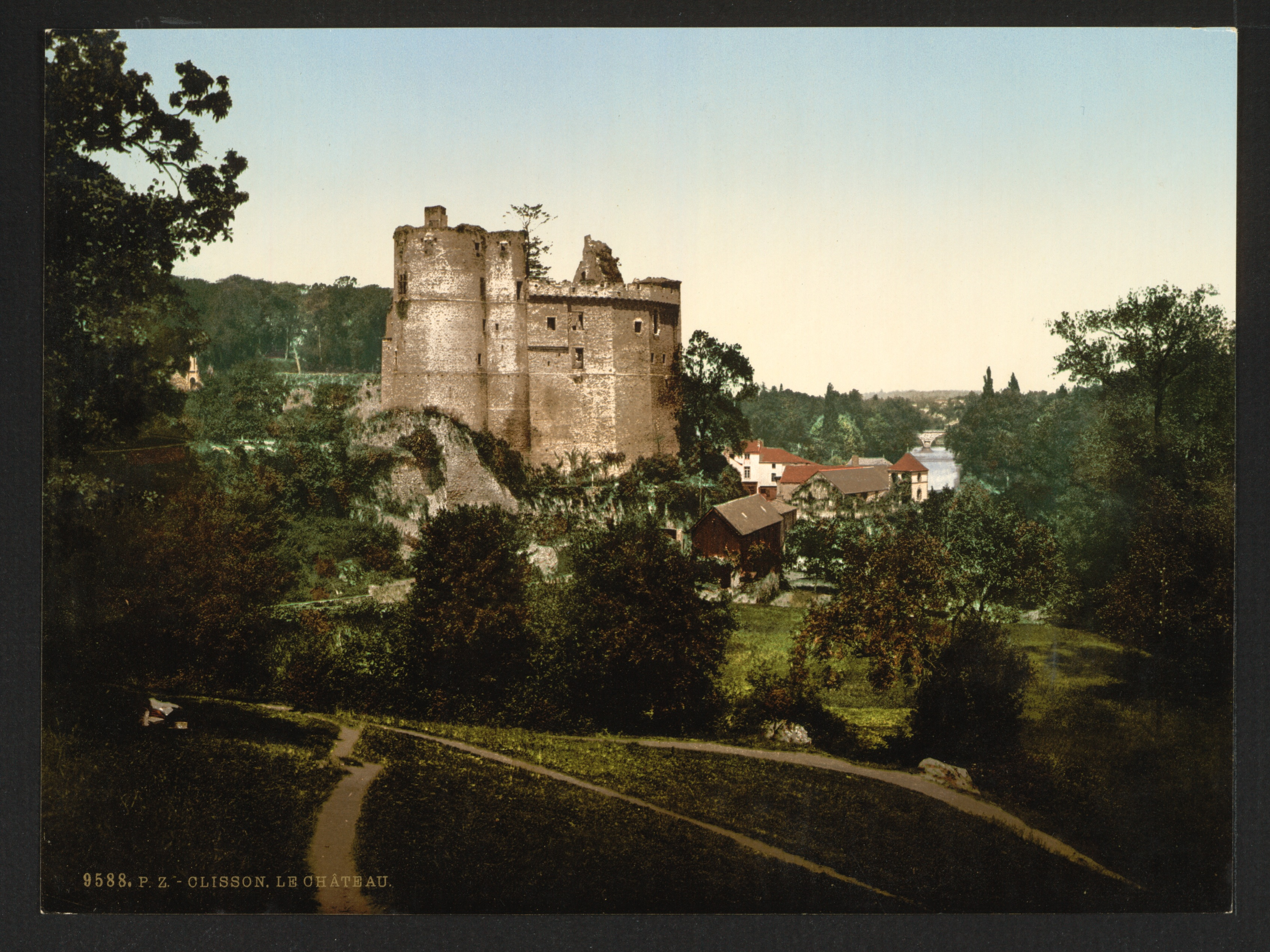
The castle ruins (seen here in the 1890s) were a source of inspiration for Romantic artists

After 1420, the castle became the property of the Duke of Brittany. It was one of the favourite residences of Duke Francis II who was remarried there, to Marguerite de Foix in 1474. He built a second rectangular enceinte flanked by artillery towers. Around 1590, the troubled period of the French Wars of Religion necessitated the construction of three terraced bastions on the south. Thus, three lines of defence in depth protected the site.

Until the 17th century, the castle was the residence of the Avaugour family, descendants of François Ier d'Avaugour, illegitimate son of François II. He modified and transformed the castle to suit the tastes and fashions of the day. During the War in the Vendée, the town and its castle were burned by the Infernal columns of Jean-Baptiste Kléber. In 1807, the estate was bought by the sculptor François-Frédéric Lemot with the goal of conservation. During the 19th century, the ruined castle attracted Romantic painters and sculptors.

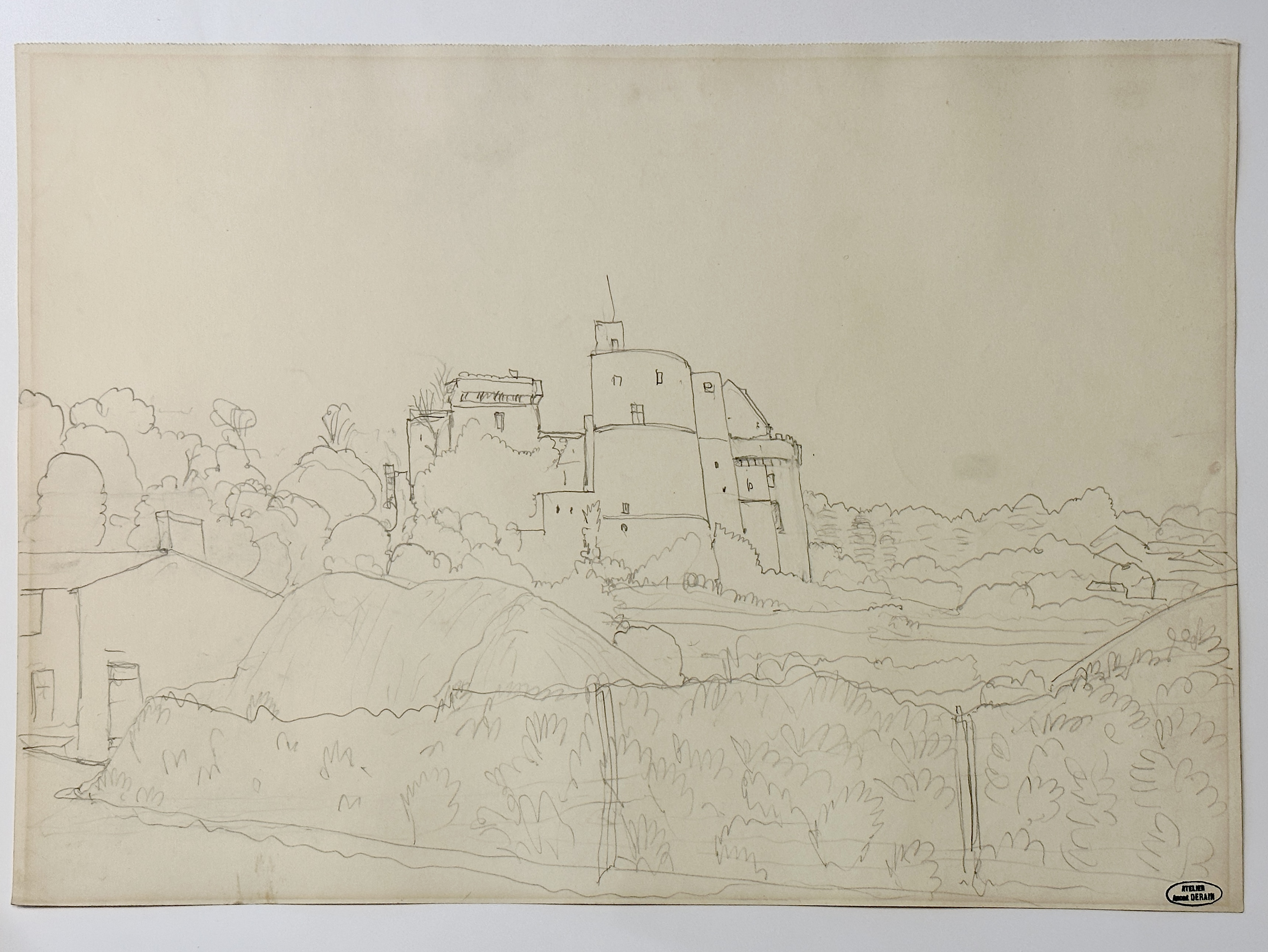
An undated drawing of the Château de Clisson by the artist André Derain (1880–1954)

The remains of the castle were classed as a monument historique by a French Ministry of Culture decree of 13 August 1924. In 1962, the castle was sold by the Lamot family to the Conseil général of the Loire-Atlantique, who carried out important restoration works with the assistance of the French Ministry of Culture.

== Art ==
The castle was the subject of Jean Metzinger's painting, Le château de Clisson (1905), displayed in the Musée des Beaux-Arts de Nantes. The Fauve artist André Derain also depicted the castle, in a drawing sold at auction in 2023.

== Gallery ==
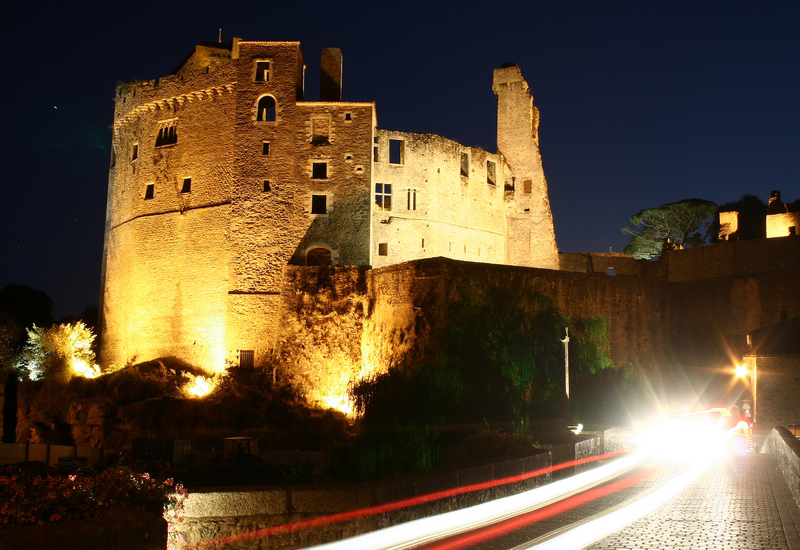

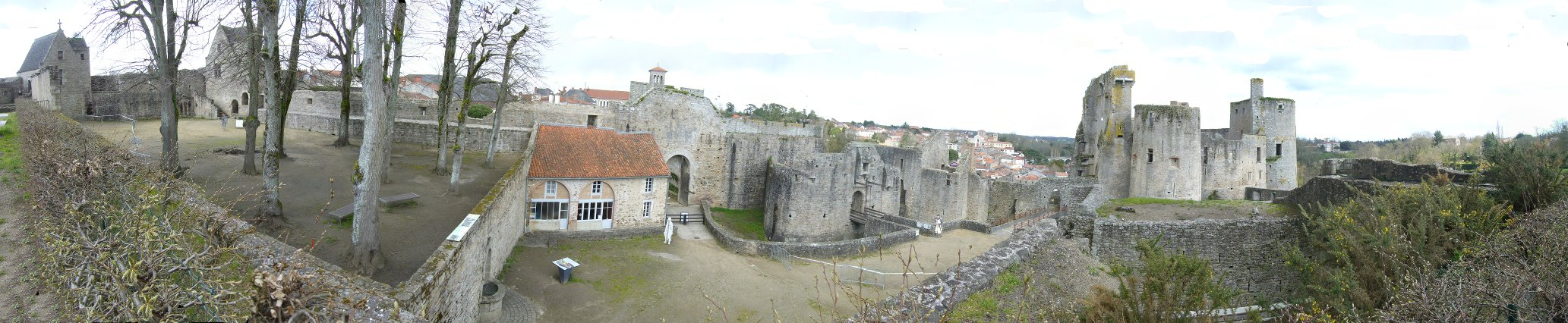

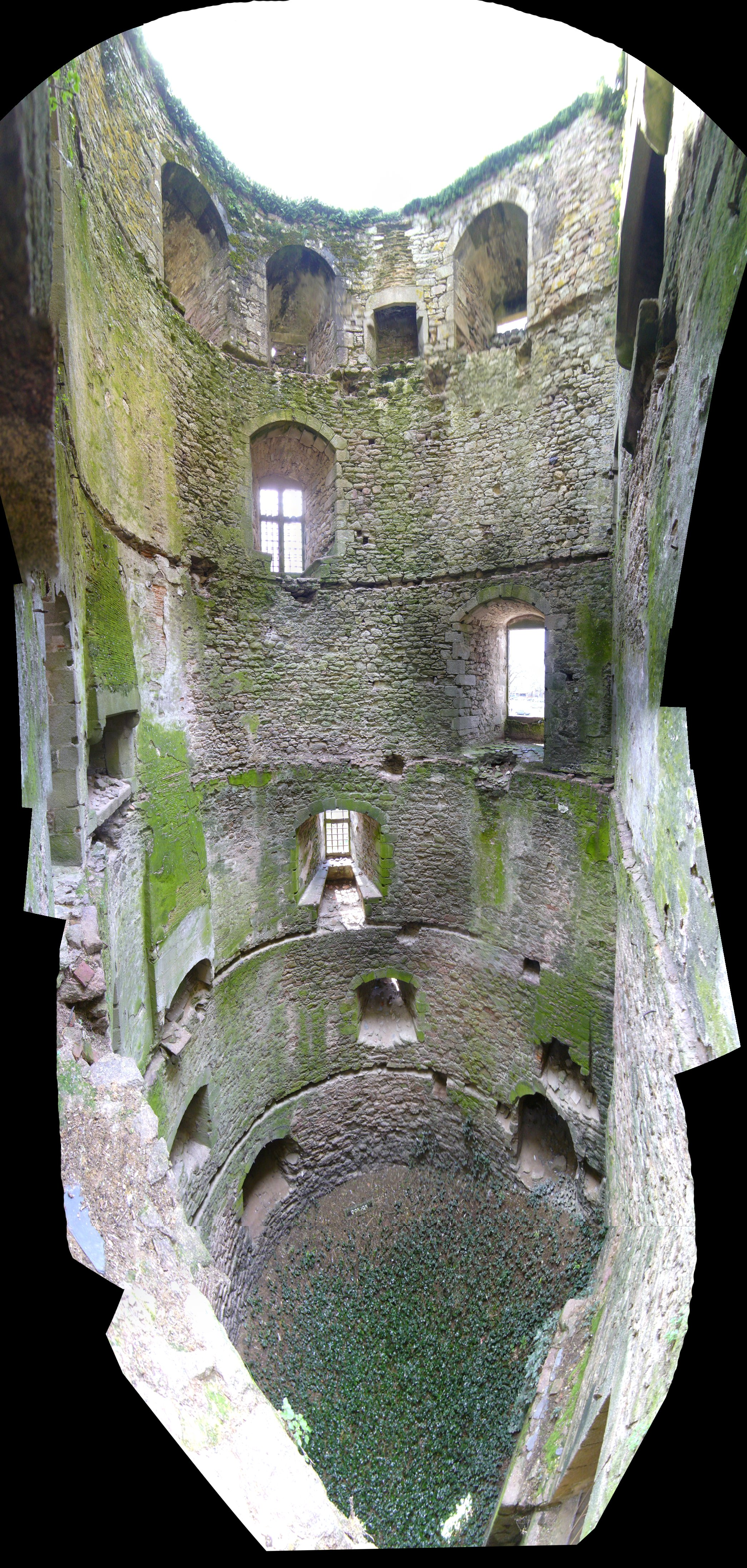

== See also ==
- List of castles in France
- Clisson
- Église Notre Dame de Clisson
- Media related to Château de Clisson at Wikimedia Commons
