= Tillières =

- Part of Sèvremoine
- Location of Tillières
- Location within France Location within Pays de la Loire
- Coordinates: 47°08′43″N 1°09′48″W
- Country: France
- Region: Pays de la Loire
- Department: Maine-et-Loire
- Arrondissement: Cholet
- Canton: Saint-Macaire-en-Mauges
- Commune: Sèvremoine
- Area^{1}: 24.13 km^{2} (9.32 sq mi)
- Elevation: 88 m (289 ft)
- Population (2022): 1,948
  - Density: 80.73/km^{2} (209.1/sq mi)
- Demonym(s): Tillièrois, Tillièroise
- Time zone: UTC+01:00 (CET)
  - Summer (DST): UTC+02:00 (CEST)
- Postal code: 49230
- ^{1} French Land Register data, which excludes lakes, ponds, glaciers > 1 km^{2} (0.386 sq mi or 247 acres) and river estuaries.

Tillières (French pronunciation: [tiljɛʁ]) is a former commune in the Maine-et-Loire department in western France.

== History ==
On 15 December 2015, Le Longeron, Montfaucon-Montigné, La Renaudière, Roussay, Saint-André-de-la-Marche, Saint-Crespin-sur-Moine, Saint-Germain-sur-Moine, Saint-Macaire-en-Mauges, Tillières and Torfou merged becoming one commune called Sèvremoine.

== See also ==
- Communes of the Maine-et-Loire department
