= Kévin Barré =

French footballer (born 1990)

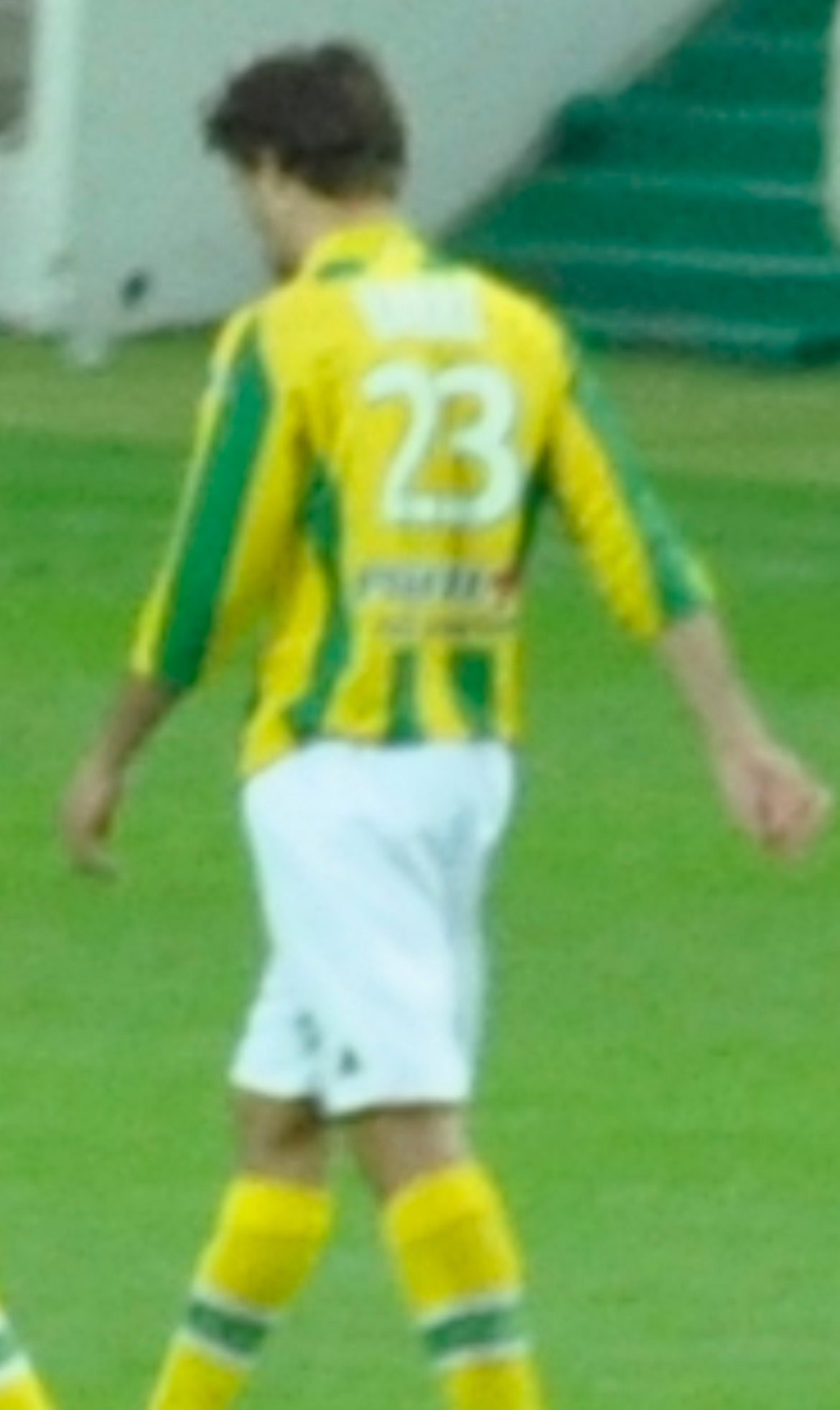

Personal information
- Date of birth: January 25, 1990 (age 36)
- Place of birth: La Tranche-sur-Mer, France
- Height: 1.88 m (6 ft 2 in)
- Position: Defender

Youth career
- 2003–2009: Nantes

Senior career*
Years	Team	Apps	(Gls)
2009–2011	Nantes	1	(0)
2011–2012	Vannes	0	(0)
2012–2014	Fontenay	47	(3)
2014–2020	USSA Vertou	101	(2)
- * Club domestic league appearances and goals as of 6 July 2024

Kévin Barré (born January 25, 1990, in Cholet, Maine-et-Loire) is a former French footballer who plays as a defender.

== Football career ==
Barré began in the Nantes youth clubs when he was 13 years old, then signed a three-year professional contract after he graduated. Due to injuries, he only played for one season. In 2011, he was picked up by Vannes for development with their reserve team. For two years, he played for and captained Fontenay. At this time, he was working on a personal project that would wind up being the opening of a Baby Time franchise in Nantes. His agency Baby Time connects parents to caregivers that suit their needs. He wanted to study early childhood prior to his football career and returned to this interest when sports were no longer viable in the long term. In 2014, signed to play with USSA Vertou.

== Personal life ==
Barré has a certificate in interior design.
