= Clisson =

Clisson Cliczon (Gallo) Klison (Breton)
- Commune
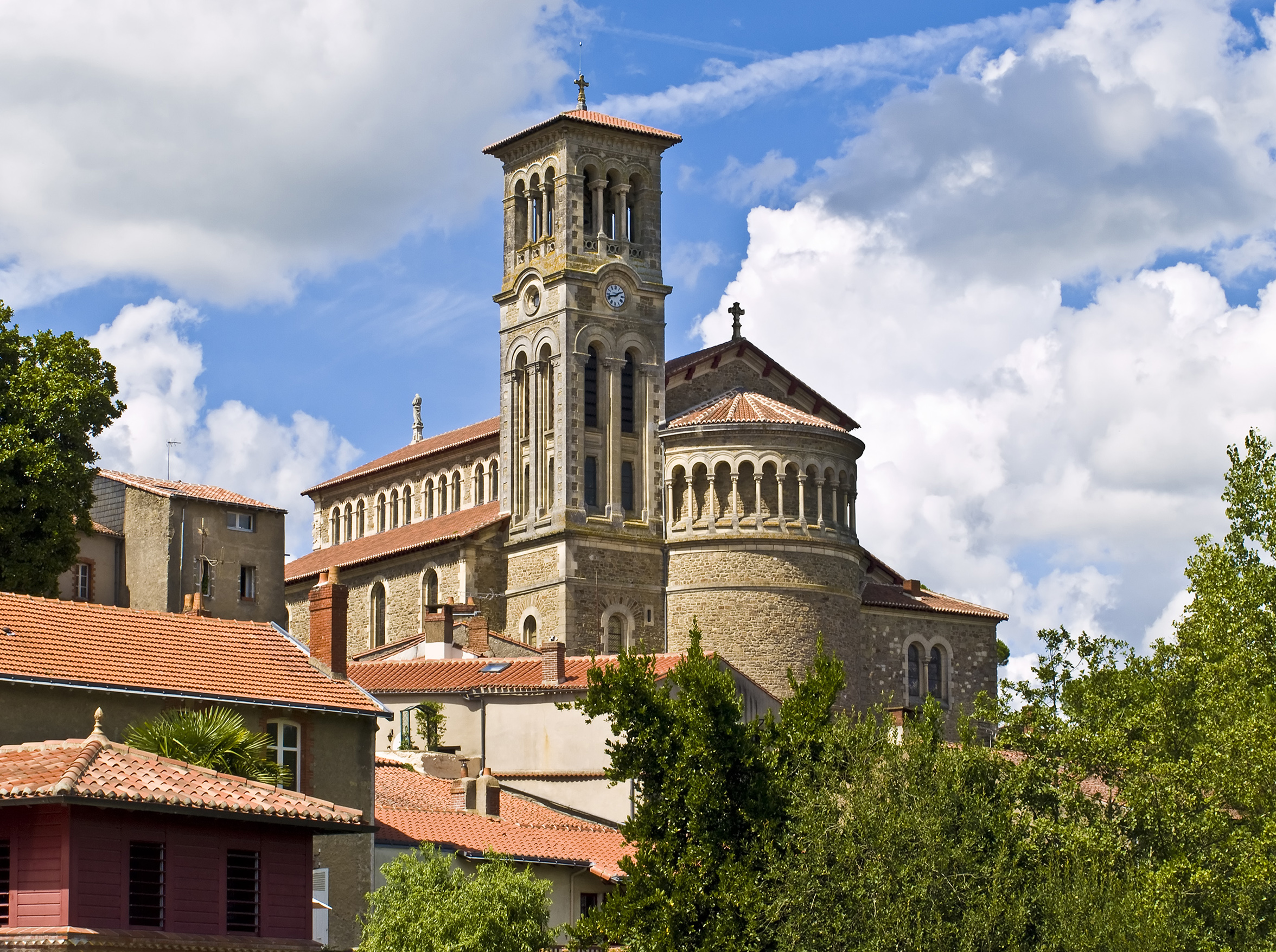
- Église Notre Dame

- Coat of arms
- Location of Clisson
- Location within France Location within Pays de la Loire
- Coordinates: 47°05′16″N 1°16′57″W
- Country: France
- Region: Pays de la Loire
- Department: Loire-Atlantique
- Arrondissement: Nantes
- Canton: Clisson
- Intercommunality: CA Clisson Sèvre et Maine Agglo

Government
  - Mayor (2020–2026): Xavier Bonnet
- Area^{1}: 11.3 km^{2} (4.4 sq mi)
- Elevation: 27 m (89 ft)
- Highest elevation: 71 m (233 ft)
- Lowest elevation: 7 m (23 ft)
- Population (2023): 7,452
  - Density: 659/km^{2} (1,710/sq mi)
- Time zone: UTC+01:00 (CET)
  - Summer (DST): UTC+02:00 (CEST)
- INSEE/Postal code: 44043 /44190
- ^{1} French Land Register data, which excludes lakes, ponds, glaciers > 1 km^{2} (0.386 sq mi or 247 acres) and river estuaries.

Clisson (French pronunciation: [klisɔ̃]; Gallo: Cliczon, Breton: Klison), is a commune in the Loire-Atlantique department, in the region of Pays de la Loire, western France.

It is situated at the confluence of the rivers Sèvre Nantaise and Moine, 27 kilometres (17 mi) southeast of Nantes.

The town and the celebrated family of Clisson (the most famous members are Olivier IV de Clisson and Jeanne de Clisson) take their name from their stronghold. Clisson has its imposing ruins, parts of which date from the thirteenth century.

The town and castle, the Château de Clisson, were destroyed in 1792 and 1793 during the War in the Vendée.

Afterwards, the sculptor François-Frédéric Lemot bought the castle, and the town was rebuilt in the early part of the 19th century according to his plans. There are picturesque parks on the banks of the rivers. The Moine is crossed by an old gothic bridge and by a fine modern viaduct.

== Population ==
Historical population

| Year | Pop. | ±% p.a. |
|---|---|---|
| 1793 | 3,144 | — |
| 1800 | 1,178 | −13.09% |
| 1806 | 2,208 | +11.04% |
| 1821 | 2,066 | −0.44% |
| 1831 | 2,432 | +1.64% |
| 1841 | 2,759 | +1.27% |
| 1846 | 2,852 | +0.67% |
| 1851 | 2,748 | −0.74% |
| 1856 | 2,808 | +0.43% |
| 1861 | 2,829 | +0.15% |
| 1866 | 2,830 | +0.01% |
| 1872 | 2,812 | −0.11% |
| 1876 | 2,826 | +0.12% |
| 1881 | 2,900 | +0.52% |
| 1886 | 2,937 | +0.25% |
| 1891 | 2,916 | −0.14% |
| 1896 | 2,904 | −0.08% |
| 1901 | 2,820 | −0.59% |

| Year | Pop. | ±% p.a. |
|---|---|---|
| 1906 | 2,790 | −0.21% |
| 1911 | 2,760 | −0.22% |
| 1921 | 2,765 | +0.02% |
| 1926 | 2,777 | +0.09% |
| 1931 | 2,770 | −0.05% |
| 1936 | 3,051 | +1.95% |
| 1946 | 3,185 | +0.43% |
| 1954 | 3,447 | +0.99% |
| 1962 | 3,719 | +0.95% |
| 1968 | 4,179 | +1.96% |
| 1975 | 4,537 | +1.18% |
| 1982 | 4,959 | +1.28% |
| 1990 | 5,495 | +1.29% |
| 1999 | 5,939 | +0.87% |
| 2007 | 6,691 | +1.50% |
| 2012 | 6,633 | −0.17% |
| 2017 | 7,187 | +1.62% |
| 2023 | 7,452 | +0.61% |

Source: EHESS and INSEE (1968–2023)

== Culture ==
The Hellfest music festival has taken place outside the town since 2006.

== International relations ==
Clisson is twinned with:

- Alatri in Italy
- (United Kingdom) Cowbridge in Wales
- Klettgau in Germany

== See also ==
- Église Notre Dame de Clisson
- Communes of the Loire-Atlantique department
