= Cholet Le Pontreau Airport =

Cholet Le Pontreau Airport Aéroport de Cholet Le Pontreau
- IATA: CET; ICAO: LFOU

Summary
- Airport type: Public
- Serves: Cholet, Maine-et-Loire, Pays de la Loire, France
- Coordinates: 47°04′55″N 000°52′37″W

Maps
- Location of Pays de la Loire region in France

- Location of airport in Pays de la Loire region

Runways
Direction	Length		Surface
Direction	m	ft	Surface
03/21	1,380	4,528	Concrete
- Source: French AIP, GCM, STV

Cholet Le Pontreau Airport (IATA: CET, ICAO: LFOU) is an airport in the French department of Maine-et-Loire, 2 kilometres (1.2 mi) north-northeast of the city of Cholet.
