= Canton of Cholet-1 =

Coordinates: 47°04′19″N 0°54′36″W

Cholet-1
- Canton
- Interactive map of Cholet-1
- Country: France
- Region: Pays de la Loire
- Department: Maine-et-Loire
- No. of communes: {{{nbcomm}}}
- Population (2023): 43,221
- INSEE code: 4912

Canton of Cholet-1 is a canton of France, located in the Maine-et-Loire department, in the Pays de la Loire region. Since the French canton reorganisation which came into effect in March 2015, the canton contains the southwestern part of the commune of Cholet.

== See also ==
- Arrondissement of Cholet
- Cantons of the Maine-et-Loire department
- Communes of the Maine-et-Loire department
