= Sèvremoine =

- Commune
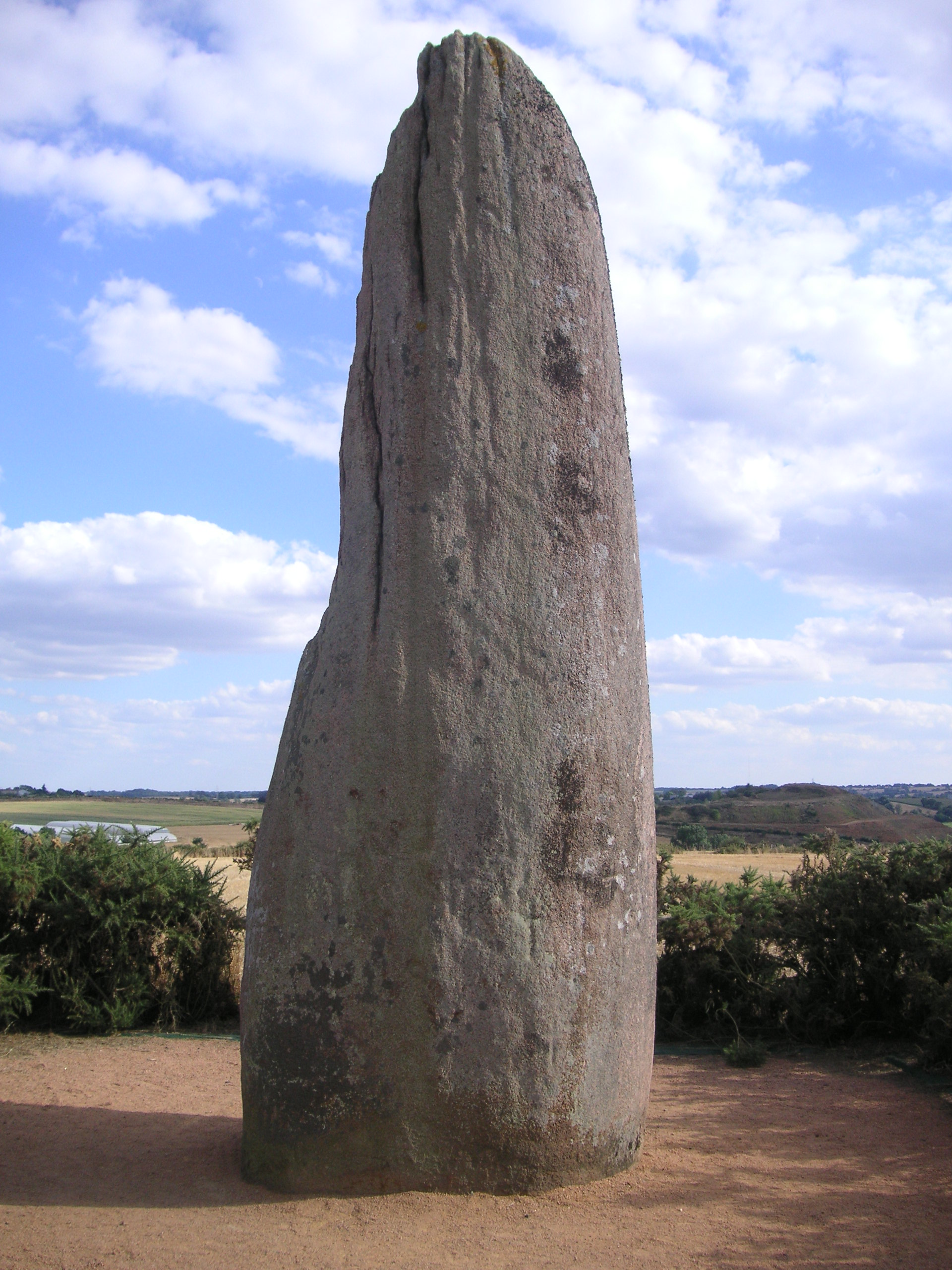
- Menhir in Saint-Macaire-en-Mauges
- Location of Sèvremoine
- Location within France Location within Pays de la Loire
- Coordinates: 47°07′26″N 0°59′38″W
- Country: France
- Region: Pays de la Loire
- Department: Maine-et-Loire
- Arrondissement: Cholet
- Canton: Sèvremoine
- Intercommunality: Mauges Communauté

Government
  - Mayor (2020–2026): Didier Huchon
- Area^{1}: 213.23 km^{2} (82.33 sq mi)
- Population (2023): 25,797
  - Density: 120.98/km^{2} (313.34/sq mi)
- Time zone: UTC+01:00 (CET)
  - Summer (DST): UTC+02:00 (CEST)
- INSEE/Postal code: 49301 /49450, 49710, 49230
- ^{1} French Land Register data, which excludes lakes, ponds, glaciers > 1 km^{2} (0.386 sq mi or 247 acres) and river estuaries.

Sèvremoine (French pronunciation: [sɛvʁəmwan]) is a commune in the Maine-et-Loire department of western France. Saint-Macaire-en-Mauges is the municipal seat. It takes its name from the river Sèvre Nantaise and Moine.

== History ==
It was established on 15 December 2015 and consists of the former communes of Le Longeron, Montfaucon-Montigné, La Renaudière, Roussay, Saint-André-de-la-Marche, Saint-Crespin-sur-Moine, Saint-Germain-sur-Moine, Saint-Macaire-en-Mauges, Tillières and Torfou.

== Population ==
Historical population
Year	Pop.	±% p.a.
1968	17,348	—
1975	18,224	+0.71%
1982	19,373	+0.88%
1990	20,037	+0.42%
1999	20,603	+0.31%
2007	23,175	+1.48%
2012	24,661	+1.25%
2017	25,414	+0.60%
2023	25,797	+0.25%
Populations of the area corresponding with the commune of Sèvremoine at 1 January 2025, INSEE

== See also ==
- Communes of the Maine-et-Loire department
