= Torfou, Maine-et-Loire =

Torfou
- Part of Sèvremoine
- Location of Torfou
- Location within France Location within Pays de la Loire
- Coordinates: 47°02′18″N 1°06′53″W
- Country: France
- Region: Pays de la Loire
- Department: Maine-et-Loire
- Arrondissement: Cholet
- Canton: Saint-Macaire-en-Mauges
- Commune: Sèvremoine
- Area^{1}: 32.35 km^{2} (12.49 sq mi)
- Elevation: 114 m (374 ft)
- Population (2022): 2,189
  - Density: 67.67/km^{2} (175.3/sq mi)
- Time zone: UTC+01:00 (CET)
  - Summer (DST): UTC+02:00 (CEST)
- Postal code: 49660
- ^{1} French Land Register data, which excludes lakes, ponds, glaciers > 1 km^{2} (0.386 sq mi or 247 acres) and river estuaries.

Torfou (French pronunciation: [tɔʁfu]) is a former commune in the Maine-et-Loire department in western France. Inhabitants of Torfou are known as Torfousiens and Torfousiennes.

== Geography ==
Torfou covers 32.35 km^{2}. It is situated along the Sèvre Nantaise river, 25 miles (40 km) Southeast of Nantes, and 12 miles (20 km) West of Cholet (reachable by rail from both cities).

The town is also at the border of three former provinces : Anjou (Maine-et-Loire), Poitou (Vendée), and Brittany (Loire-Atlantique).

== History ==
During the early years of the French revolutionary wars, the town found itself at the heart of the counter-revolutionary struggle in the Vendée, especially on 19 September 1793, with the Battle of Torfou. This battle pitted many Royalist military leaders against Republican troops under Kléber and Canclaux and followed by a period of brutal government repression.

On 15 December 2015, Le Longeron, Montfaucon-Montigné, La Renaudière, Roussay, Saint-André-de-la-Marche, Saint-Crespin-sur-Moine, Saint-Germain-sur-Moine, Saint-Macaire-en-Mauges, Tillières and Torfou merged becoming one commune called Sèvremoine.

== Sights ==
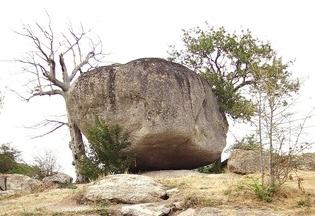
La Pierre Tournisse - Torfou (49)

- La Pierre Tournisse, round monolith of granite standing on an hillock.
- La Colonne, column situated at the crossroads of roads D149 and D753, commemorating the Battle of Torfou.
- La Voie Romaine, a Roman road which was following the Sèvre Nantaise river and linking Nantes to Poitiers during Roman times.
- Les bords de Sèvre, the Sèvre Nantaise river banks.

== Twin town ==
Torfou is twinned with :

- Hachen, municipality of Sundern, North Rhine-Westphalia, Germany, since 2001.

== See also ==
- Communes of the Maine-et-Loire department
