= First Battle of Cholet =

Coordinates: 47°03′36″N 0°52′42″W

- Part of the War in the Vendée
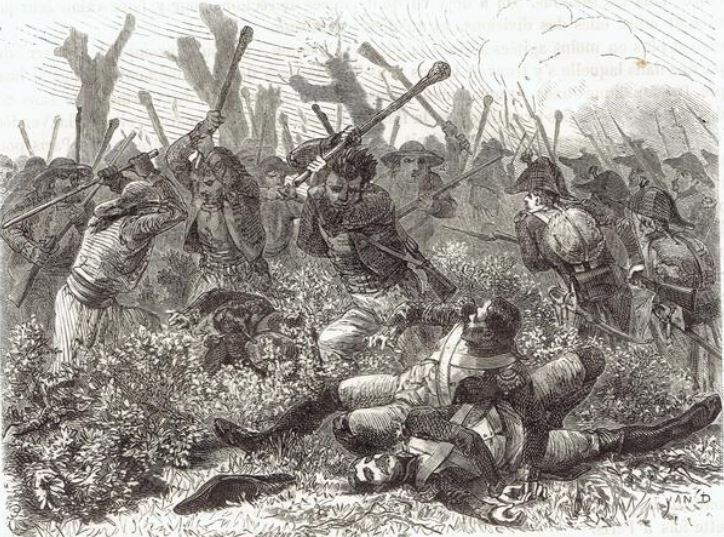
- Attack on Cholet by Cathelineau's troops, illustration by Yan' Dargent, 1866.
Date	15 March 1793
Location	Cholet, France
Result	Vendéen victory

Belligerents
(France) French Republic	Vendeans

Commanders and leaders
Vincent Beauvau-Tigny †	Jacques Cathelineau; Jean-Nicolas Stofflet

Strength
580 men	15,000 men

Casualties and losses
150 deaths 400 prisoners	40 deaths

The First Battle of Cholet took place during the War in the Vendée on 15 March 1793 in which the city of Cholet was captured by the Vendée insurgents.

== Prelude ==
The National Convention having ordered, on February 23, the conscription of 300,000 men, the first riots began in the Mauges at the announcement of the terms of recruitment. On the March 2 and 3, young men from the canton assembled at Cholet by the district manifested their refusal to leave. In Beaupréau, mobs threatened the national guard, which shot and killed three rebels and wounded eight.

On 12 March, at Saint-Florent-le-Vieil, 600 peasants put the republican forces to flight. On March 13, the peasants, who had put Jacques Cathelineau at their head, took Jallais. On March 14, Chemillé fell in his turn, stormed by these same peasants. Most of the 200 National Guards defending the city were captured, as well as their three culverins, the largest of which was renamed the "Marie-Jeanne" by the peasants of Anjou; they made it a true mascot.

The victories of Cathelineau provoked the uprising of hundreds of other parishes, which joined the small army of the insurgents, notably Jean-Nicolas Stofflet.

== The battle ==
On 15 March the peasants, numbering 15,000, presented themselves before Cholet. An emissary was sent to negotiate the surrender of the patriots, but Beauveau, the commandant of the place, refused. He estimated that his 580 National Guards, who were well armed, were sufficient to repel peasants armed with scythes.

However, he was mistaken. In a few hours, the 15,000 insurgents seized the city and killed 150 patriots, including Beauveau. An important booty was seized by the rebels.

== Consequences ==
The next day the insurgents seized Vihiers, which the patriots had preferred to abandon. The peasants, however, were afraid of the repression of the "Blues", which they knew to be inevitable. It was at that moment that the insurgents went to fetch the nobles of their country, former soldiers, to force them to put themselves at their head. Thus, several nobles like Charles Artus of Bonchamps or Maurice Gigost of Elbée joined the insurrection.

At the initiative of their leaders, the insurgents then decided to march on Chalonnes-sur-Loire, near Angers. The city was defended by 4,000 soldiers. Faced with the threat of the insurgents, the defenders preferred to abandon the city and retreated to Angers. At that moment, the peasants, who had driven the patriots out of their countries, dispersed and returned home.

The revolt had thus ended, but the revolutionary armies sent to repress it were to restart the war in the Mauges.

On April 14, 1793, the republican General Leygonier occupied the city of Cholet, which would be resumed the next day by the royalists. The republican prisoners, including Jean-Julien Savary, were saved from death thanks to the prayer of the inhabitants.

== Bibliography ==
- Tabeur, Jean (2008). Paris contre la Province, les guerres de l'Ouest. Economica.
- Gras, Yves (1994). La Guerre de Vendée. Economica.
- Savary, Jean Julien Michel (1824). Guerres des Vendéens et des Chouans contre la République. Vol. I. pp. 70–88. Savary..
