= Hôtel de Ville, Cholet =

Town hall in Cholet, France

Hôtel de Ville
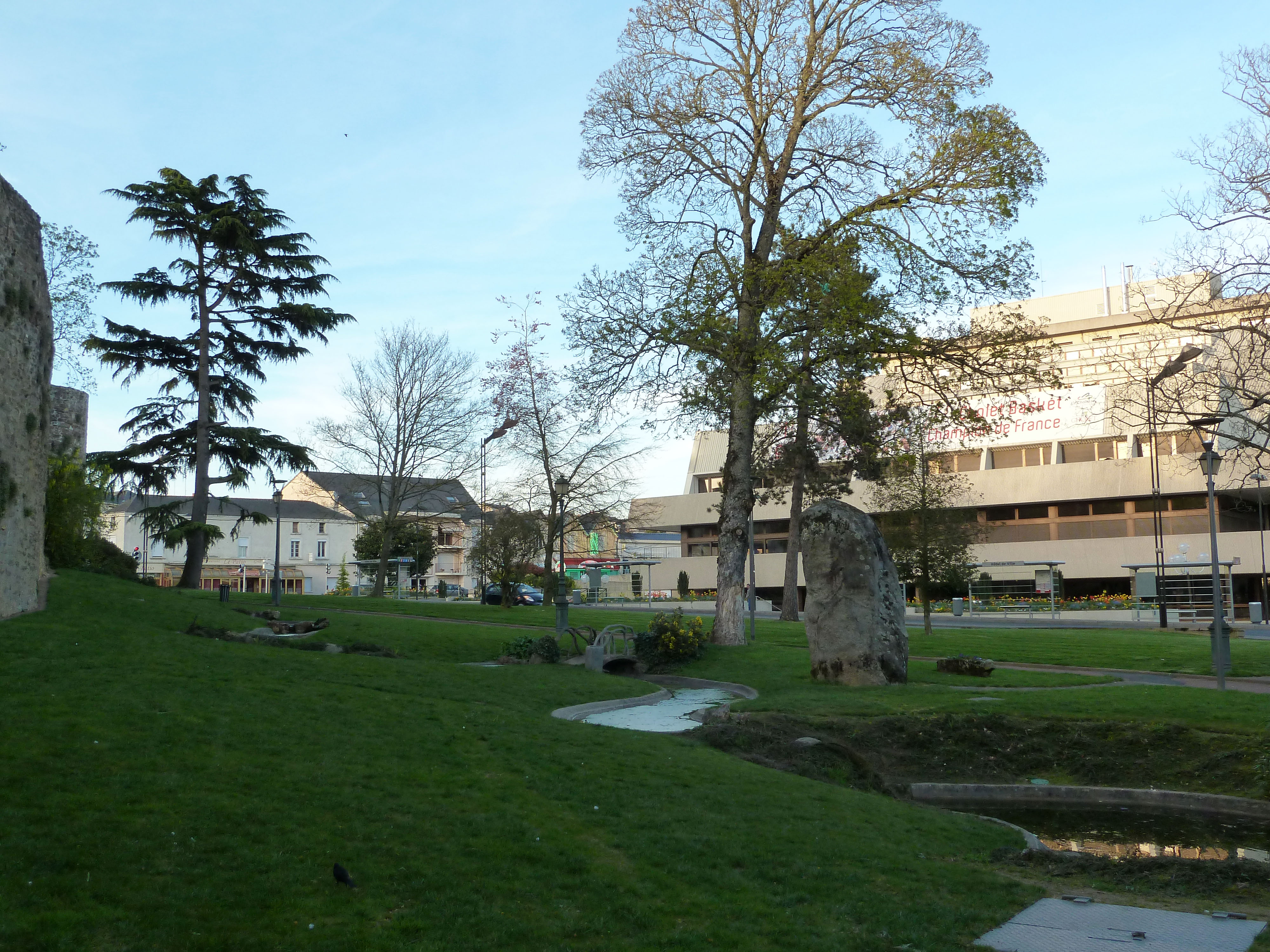
- The main frontage of the Hôtel de Ville in April 2011
- Interactive map of the Hôtel de Ville area

General information
- Type: City hall
- Architectural style: Modern style
- Location: Cholet, France
- Coordinates: 47.0592°N 0.8793°W
- Completed: 1976

Design and construction
- Architect: Francis Pierrès

The Hôtel de Ville (French pronunciation: [otɛl də vil], City Hall) is a municipal building in Cholet, Maine-et-Loire, western France, standing on Rue Saint-Bonaventure.

== History ==
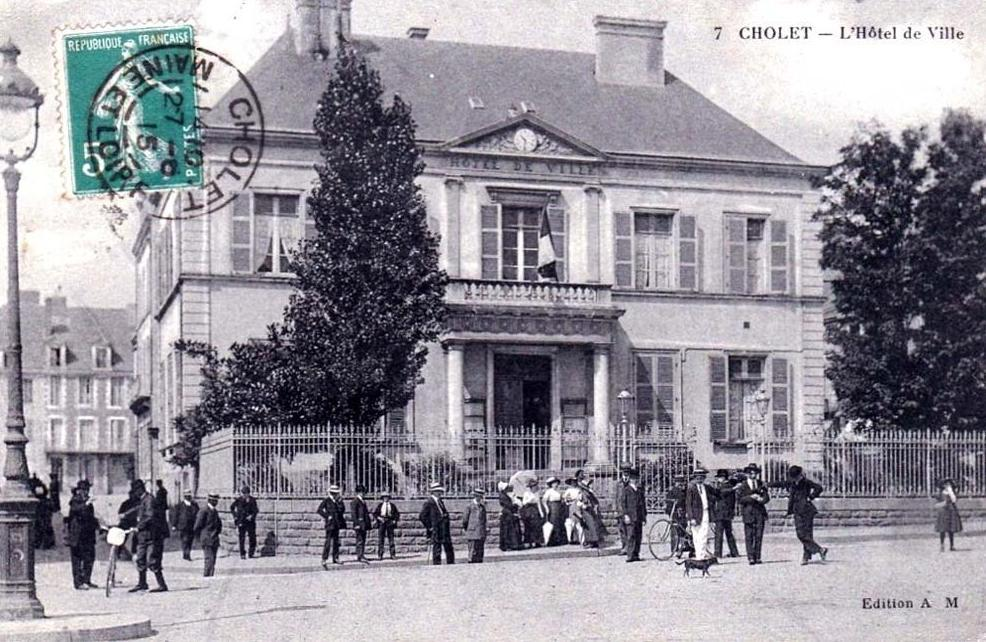
The old town hall

In the early 1820s, the town council decided to commission a new town hall. The site they selected was on the west side of the central square (now Place Travot). Construction of the new building started in 1824. It was designed in the neoclassical style, built in ashlar stone and was completed in 1817. The design involved a symmetrical main frontage of five bays facing onto the central square. The central bay featured a square headed doorway with a porch formed by a pair of Doric order columns supporting an entablature with triglyphs and a balcony with a stone balustrade: on the first floor, there was a French door with a cornice, flanked by Ionic order pilasters supporting a modillioned pediment. There was a clock surrounded by ornate carvings in the tympanum. The outer bays were fenestrated by casement windows with shutters and there were quoins at the corners.

Following the liberation of the town by the French Forces of the Interior and the British Special Air Service on 31 August 1944, during the Second World War, the mayor, Alphonse Darmaillacq, gave an impassioned speech from the balcony. The president of France, General Charles de Gaulle attended a reception in the town hall, before giving a speech from the centre of Place Travot, when he visited the town in May 1965.

By the mid-1960s, the old town hall was considered too small, and the town council decided to commission a modern building. The site they selected was the champ de foire (fairground). The area had served as a cattle market since November 1871. (Note: In 1976, the old town hall became the Vendée war museum and later became the headquarters of the council's cultural services. It became a brasserie in 1996 and now operates as the Grand Café. The conversion of the old town hall into a brasserie attracted considerable opposition at the time, particularly from the former mayor, Maurice Ligot, who had welcomed De Gaulle there in 1965.)

Construction of the new building started in January 1975. It was designed by Francis Pierrès in the modern style, built in reinforced concrete and glass at a cost of FFr 23 million and was officially opened by the mayor, Maurice Ligot, on 17 December 1976. The design involved a wide main frontage facing onto Rue Travot with each of the five tiers being recessed from the one below. It was faced with alternating bands of concrete and dark-framed windows and was described in the local media as being similar to a typewriter. Internally, the principal room was the Salle du Conseil (council chamber).

A major programme of works to refurbish the reception area of the town hall, allowing more centralisation of the delivery of services, was completed at a cost of €625,000 in April 2024.
