= Moine (river) =

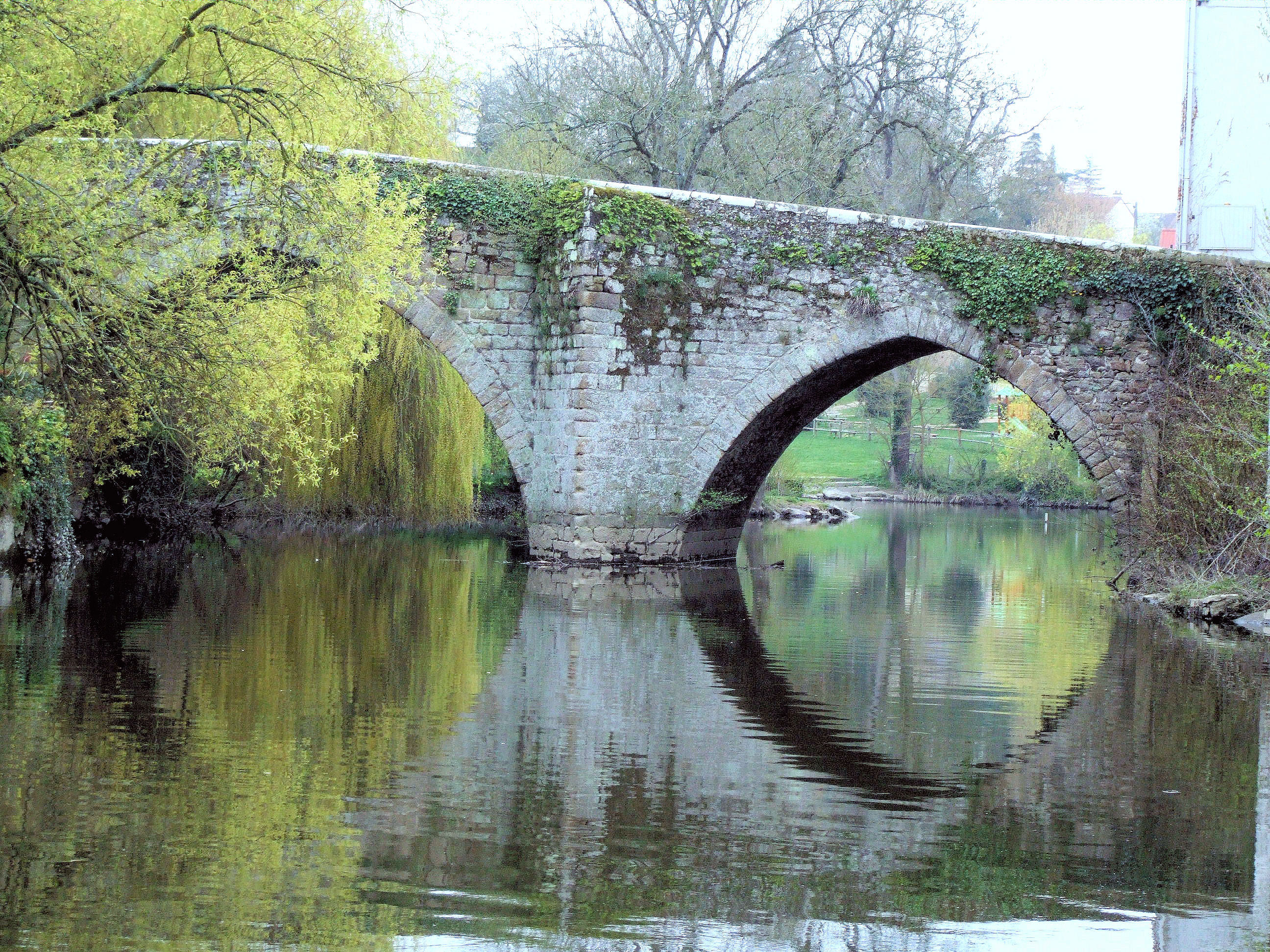

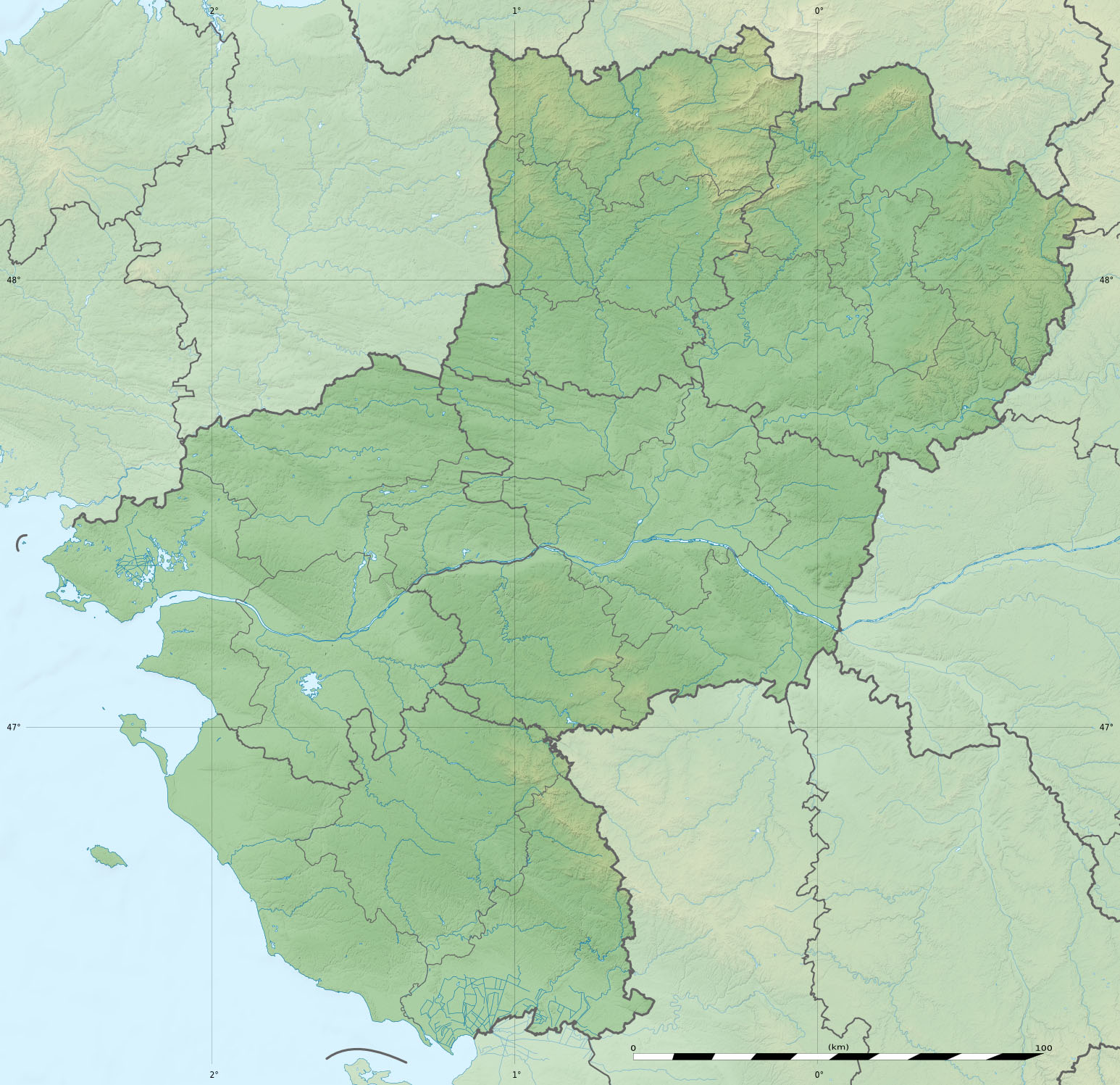
- Location within France Location within Pays de la Loire

Location
- Country: France

Physical characteristics
- Mouth: Sèvre Nantaise
  - location: Clisson
  - coordinates: 47.0861°N 1.2785°W
- Length: 68.8 km (42.8 mi)

Basin features
- Progression: Sèvre Nantaise→ Loire→ Atlantic Ocean

The Moine (French pronunciation: [mwan]; Breton: Manac'h) is a river in western France. It is a 68.8 km (42.8 mi) long right tributary of the Sèvre Nantaise. It flows into the Sèvre Nantaise in Clisson. The towns Cholet and Sèvremoine lie on the Moine.
