= Choletbus =

Bus transport system in Cholet, France

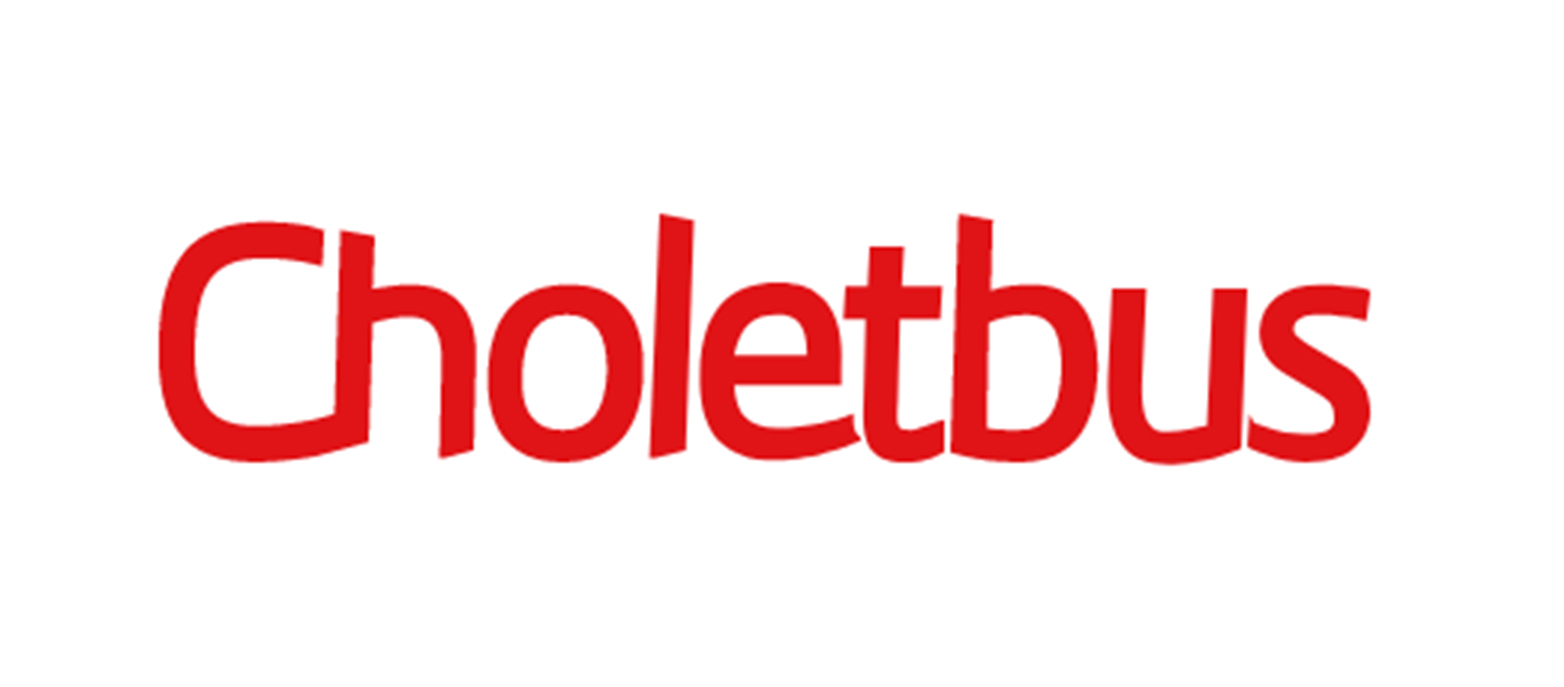

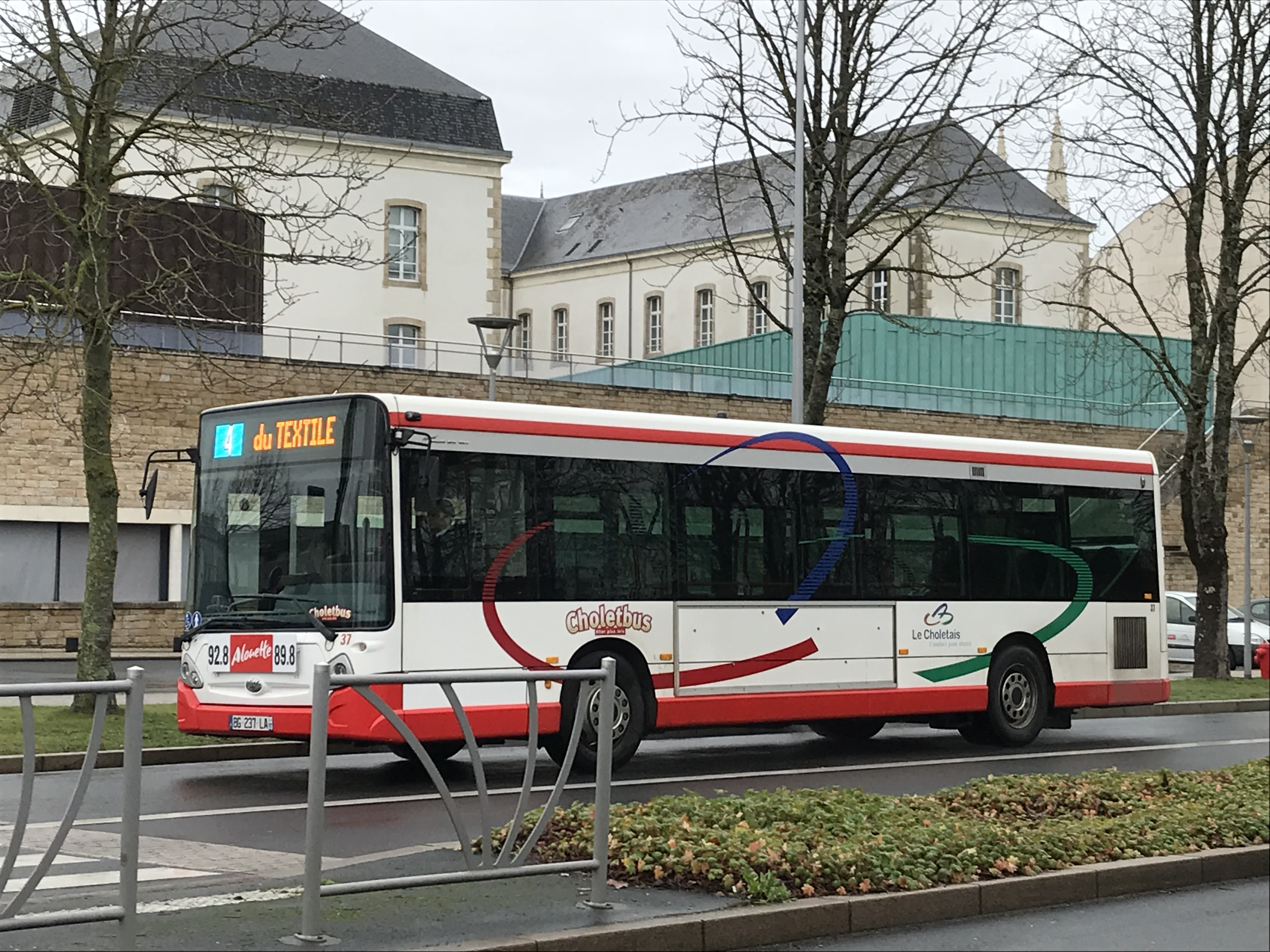
- Bus on line 4
- Headquarters: Cholet
- Locale: Cholet Agglomération
- Service area: France
- Service type: Urban bus service, Peri-urban bus service
- Routes: 18 lines
- Stops: 250
- Destinations: Cholet and agglomeration
- Operator: Transports Publics du Choletais
- Website: http://www.choletbus.fr

Choletbus (French pronunciation: [ʃɔlebys]) is a network of urban and periurban buses in the city of Cholet, France. The network is operated on behalf of the Cholet Agglomération by Transports Publics du Choletais.

The Choletbus network contains a total of eighteen bus lines, of which eleven form the central network that serves Cholet and seven other lines form a peri-urban network that serves the communes of the agglomeration. The entire network is made up of 250 different stopping points.
