= Monfaucon =

Monfaucon may refer to:

- Monfaucon, Dordogne, France
- Monfaucon, Hautes-Pyrénées, France

== See also ==
- Montfaucon (disambiguation)
