= Saint-André-de-la-Marche =

- Part of Sèvremoine
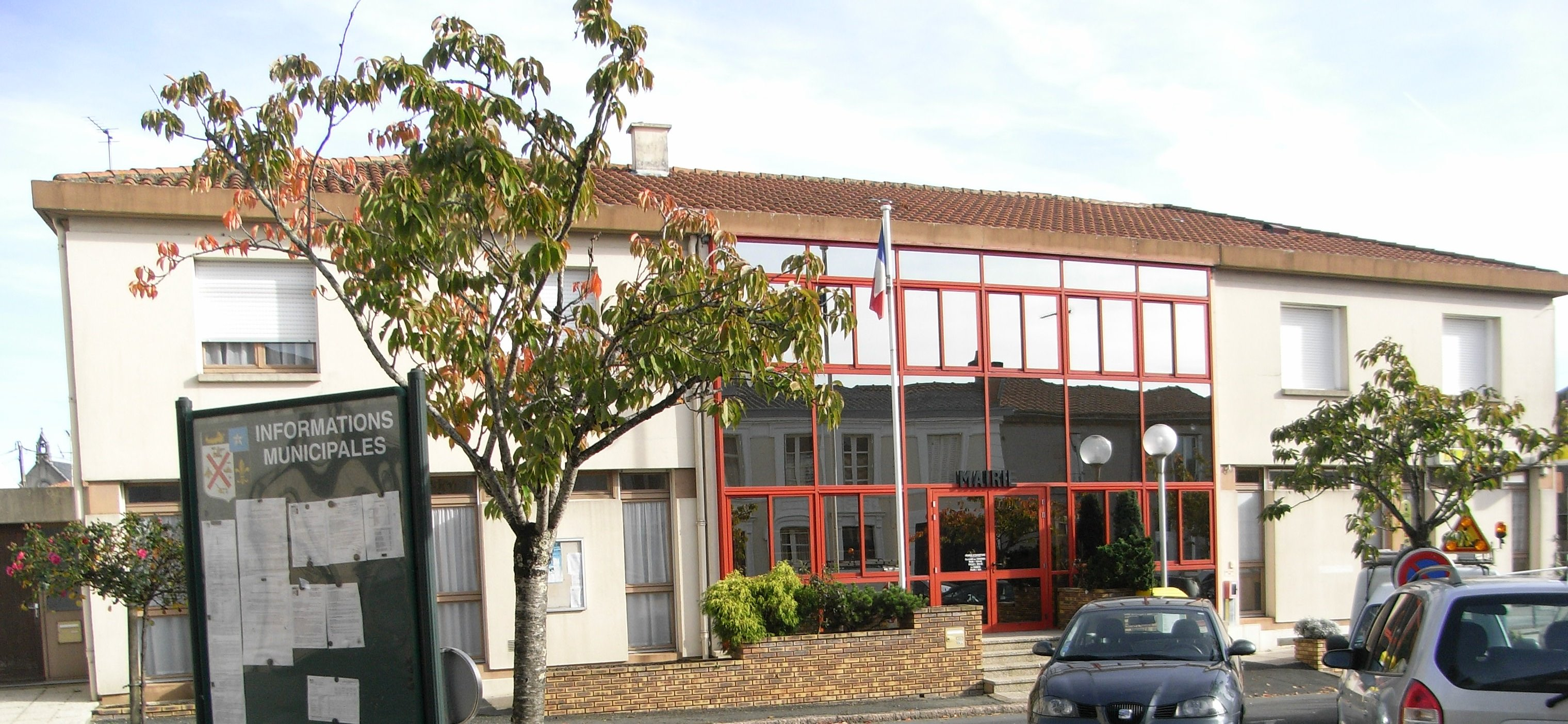
- Town hall
- Location of Saint-André-de-la-Marche
- Location within France Location within Pays de la Loire
- Coordinates: 47°06′03″N 0°59′38″W
- Country: France
- Region: Pays de la Loire
- Department: Maine-et-Loire
- Arrondissement: Cholet
- Canton: Saint-Macaire-en-Mauges
- Commune: Sèvremoine
- Area^{1}: 11.03 km^{2} (4.26 sq mi)
- Elevation: 80 m (260 ft)
- Population (2022): 2,904
  - Density: 263.3/km^{2} (681.9/sq mi)
- Time zone: UTC+01:00 (CET)
  - Summer (DST): UTC+02:00 (CEST)
- Postal code: 49450
- ^{1} French Land Register data, which excludes lakes, ponds, glaciers > 1 km^{2} (0.386 sq mi or 247 acres) and river estuaries.

Saint-André-de-la-Marche (French pronunciation: [sɛ̃.t‿ɑ̃dʁe də la maʁʃ]) is a former commune in the Maine-et-Loire department in western France.

== History ==
On 15 December 2015, Le Longeron, Montfaucon-Montigné, La Renaudière, Roussay, Saint-André-de-la-Marche, Saint-Crespin-sur-Moine, Saint-Germain-sur-Moine, Saint-Macaire-en-Mauges, Tillières and Torfou merged, becoming one commune called Sèvremoine.

The Musée des Métiers de la Chaussure de Saint-André-de-la-Marche (Maine-et-Loire, France) is a museum about the manufacture of shoes, founded in 1995 and located in a 1919 factory.

== See also ==
- Communes of the Maine-et-Loire department
