= Église Notre Dame (Clisson) =

Notre-Dame de Clisson
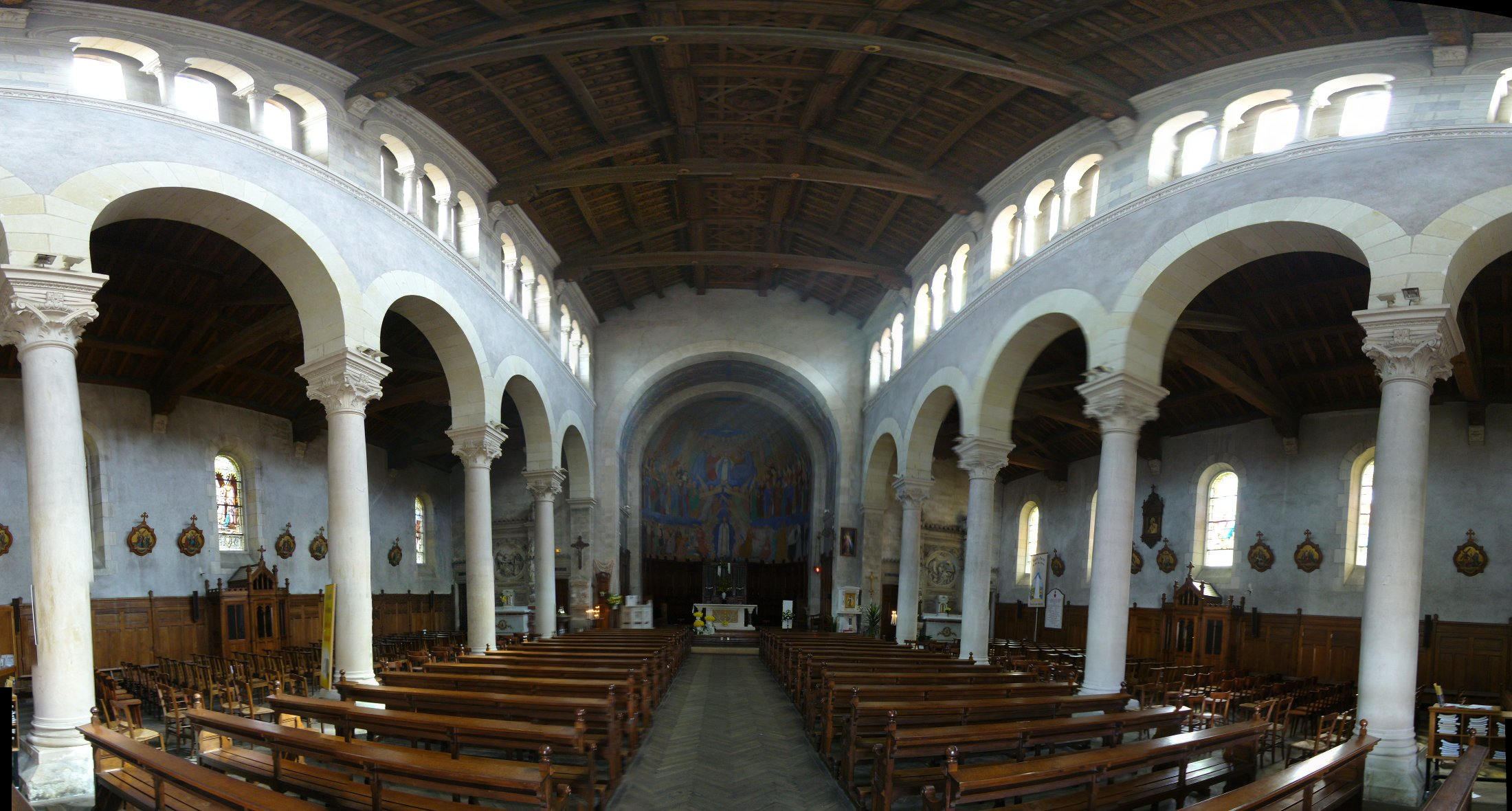

- Location within France
- 47.087485°N 1.281243°W
- Country: France
- Denomination: Roman Catholic Church

History
- Founder: Olivier de Clisson

Architecture
- Architectural type: church

Église Notre Dame is a Roman Catholic church in the town of Clisson, France. It was founded by Olivier V de Clisson in the 14th–15th century. The church was razed during the War in the Vendée, and later renovated under the Empire in the early 19th century. It was completely demolished and rebuilt in 1885–88 by Nantais architect René Ménard, modelled after Roman basilicas. It is a listed monument since 2006.

== Gallery ==
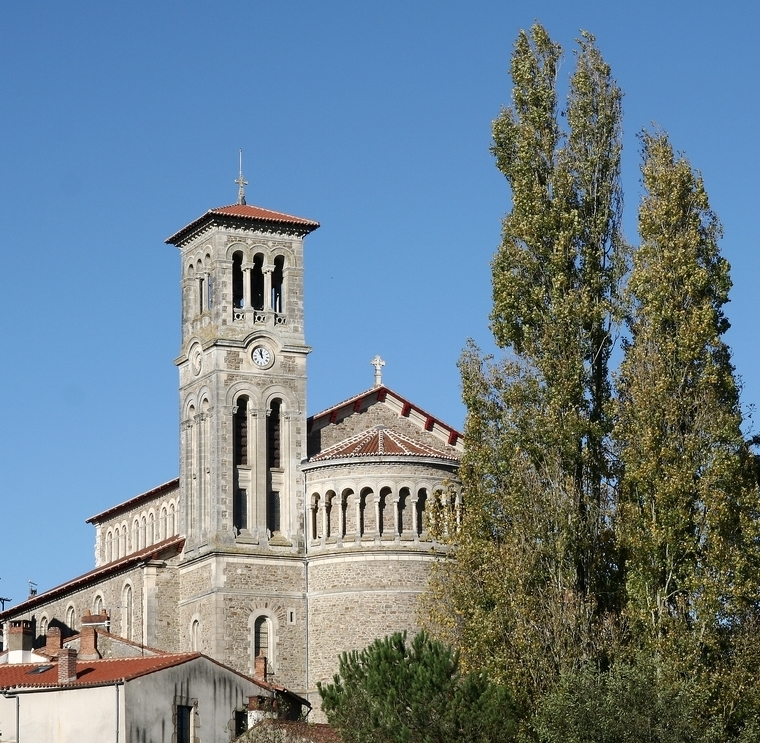

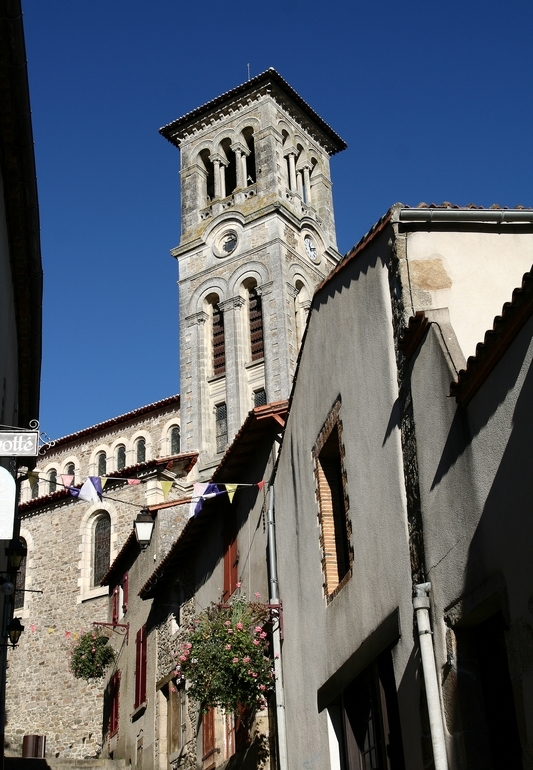

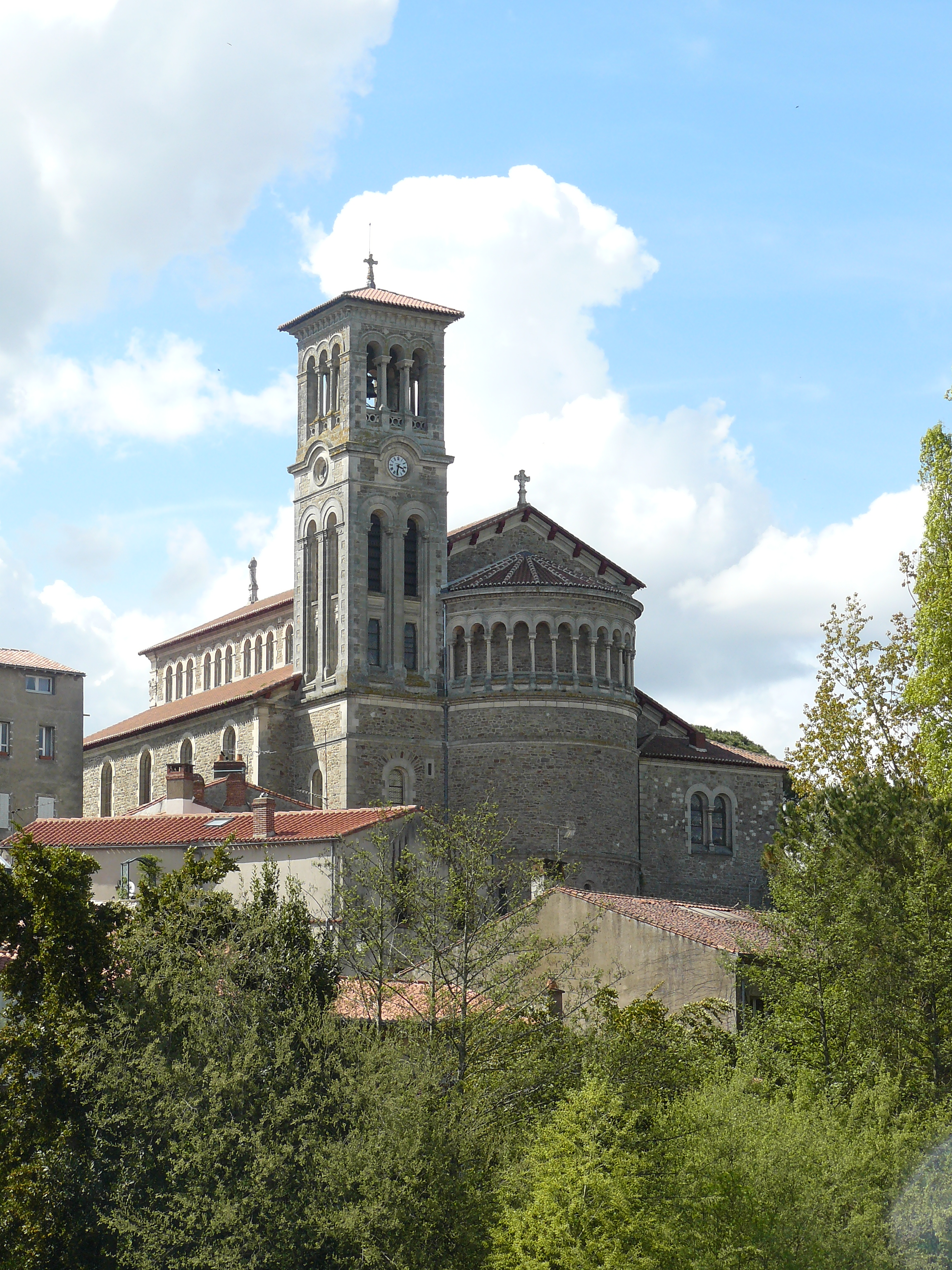

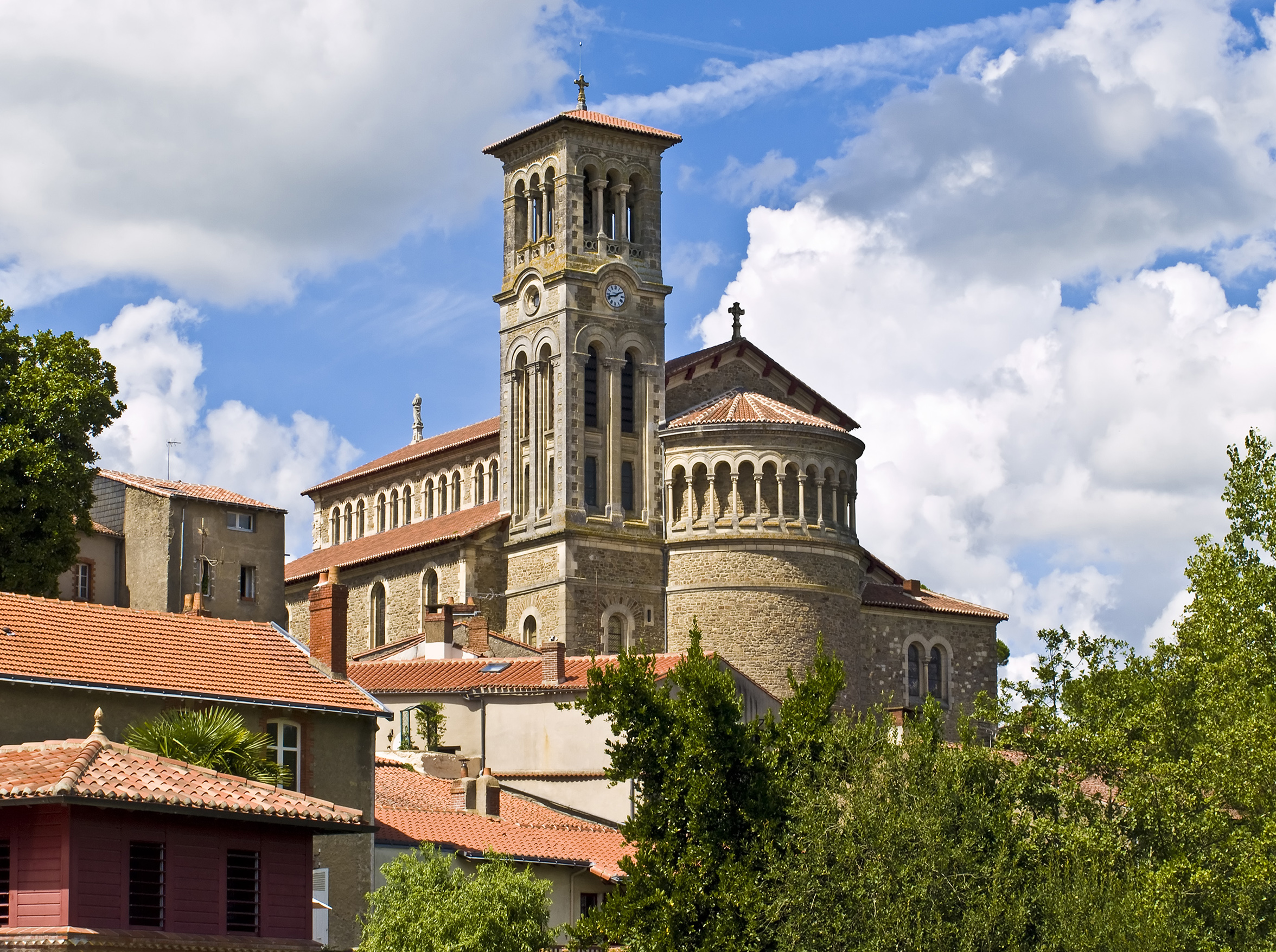
