= Montfaucon-Montigné =

- Part of Sèvremoine
- Location of Montfaucon-Montigné
- Location within France Location within Pays de la Loire
- Coordinates: 47°06′03″N 1°07′26″W
- Country: France
- Region: Pays de la Loire
- Department: Maine-et-Loire
- Arrondissement: Cholet
- Canton: Saint-Macaire-en-Mauges
- Commune: Sèvremoine
- Area^{1}: 17.06 km^{2} (6.59 sq mi)
- Elevation: 60 m (200 ft)
- Population (2022): 2,338
  - Density: 137.0/km^{2} (354.9/sq mi)
- Demonym(s): Montois, Montoise
- Time zone: UTC+01:00 (CET)
  - Summer (DST): UTC+02:00 (CEST)
- Postal code: 49230
- ^{1} French Land Register data, which excludes lakes, ponds, glaciers > 1 km^{2} (0.386 sq mi or 247 acres) and river estuaries.

Montfaucon-Montigné (French pronunciation: [mɔ̃fokɔ̃ mɔ̃tiɲe]) is a former commune in the Maine-et-Loire department in western France.

== History ==
The commune was created in 2000 from the merger of Montfaucon-sur-Moine and Montigné-sur-Moine, two formerly neighboring towns.

On 15 December 2015, Le Longeron, Montfaucon-Montigné, La Renaudière, Roussay, Saint-André-de-la-Marche, Saint-Crespin-sur-Moine, Saint-Germain-sur-Moine, Saint-Macaire-en-Mauges, Tillières and Torfou merged becoming one commune called Sèvremoine.

== See also ==
- Communes of the Maine-et-Loire department
