= Torfou, Essonne =

Commune in Île-de-France, France

Torfou
- Commune
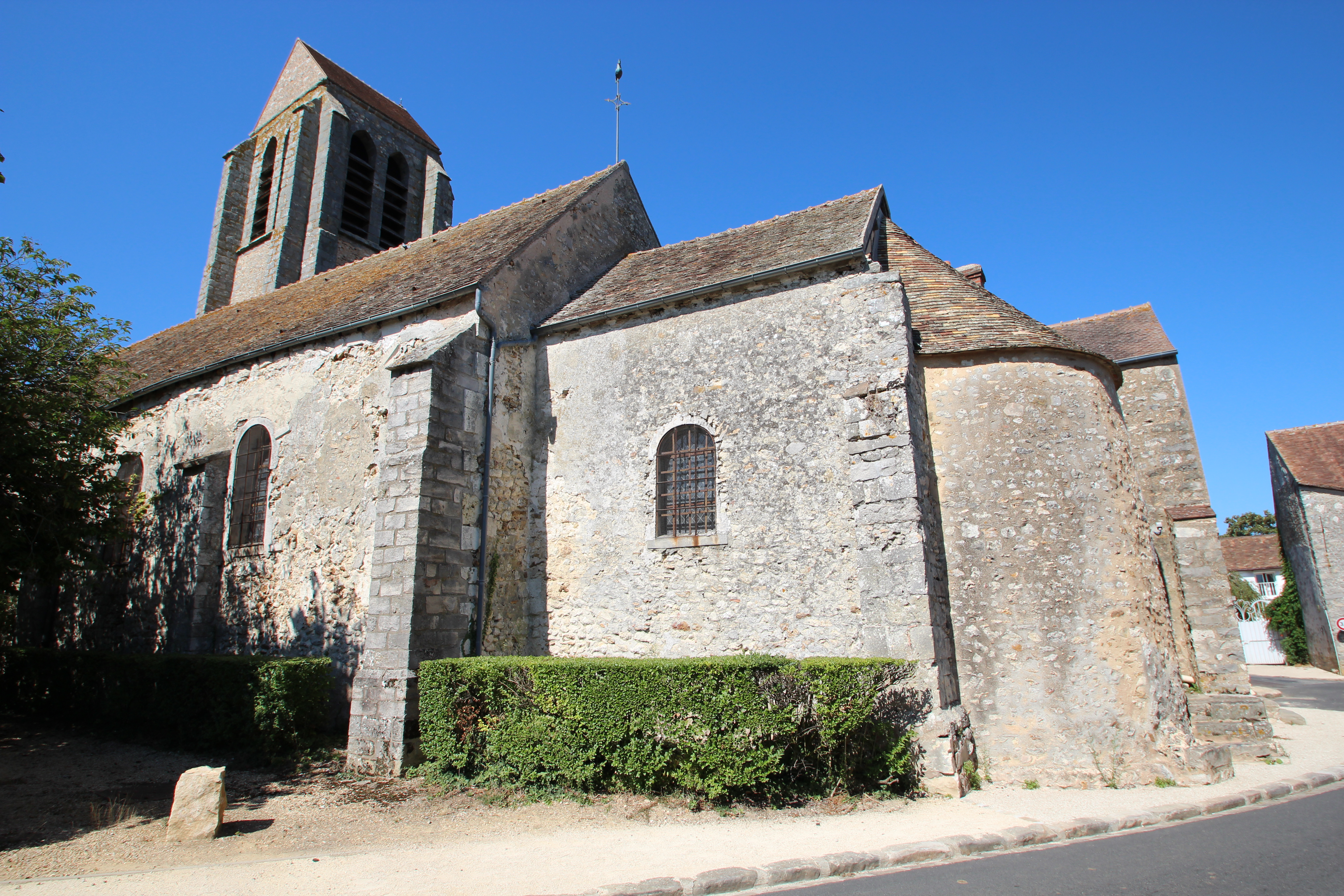
- The church of Our Lady, in Torfou
- Location of Torfou
- Location within France Location within Île-de-France (region)
- Coordinates: 48°31′48″N 2°13′39″E
- Country: France
- Region: Île-de-France
- Department: Essonne
- Arrondissement: Étampes
- Canton: Arpajon
- Intercommunality: Entre Juine et Renarde

Government
  - Mayor (2020–2026): Antoine Poupinel
- Area^{1}: 3.50 km^{2} (1.35 sq mi)
- Highest elevation: 155 m (509 ft)
- Lowest elevation: 94 m (308 ft)
- Population (2023): 294
  - Density: 84.0/km^{2} (218/sq mi)
- Time zone: UTC+01:00 (CET)
  - Summer (DST): UTC+02:00 (CEST)
- INSEE/Postal code: 91619 /91730
- ^{1} French Land Register data, which excludes lakes, ponds, glaciers > 1 km^{2} (0.386 sq mi or 247 acres) and river estuaries.

Torfou (French pronunciation: [tɔʁfu]) is a commune in the Essonne department in Île-de-France in northern France.

Inhabitants of Torfou are known as Torfoliens.

== See also ==
- Communes of the Essonne department
