= Canton of Angers-1 =

Coordinates: 47.47°N 0.55°W

- Canton
- Interactive map of Canton of Angers-1
- Country: France
- Region: Pays de la Loire
- Department: Maine-et-Loire
- No. of communes: {{{nbcomm}}}
- Established: 23 July 1973; 22 March 2015

Government
  - Representatives (2021–2028): Roselyne Bienvenu; Emmanuel Capus
- Population (2023): 43,749
- INSEE code: 49 01

The canton of Angers-1 (French: Canton d'Angers-1) is an administrative division of the Maine-et-Loire department, in western France. It was created at the French canton reorganisation which came into effect in March 2015. Its seat is in Angers.

It consists of the following communes:

1. Angers (partly)
