= Cholet =

- Subprefecture and commune
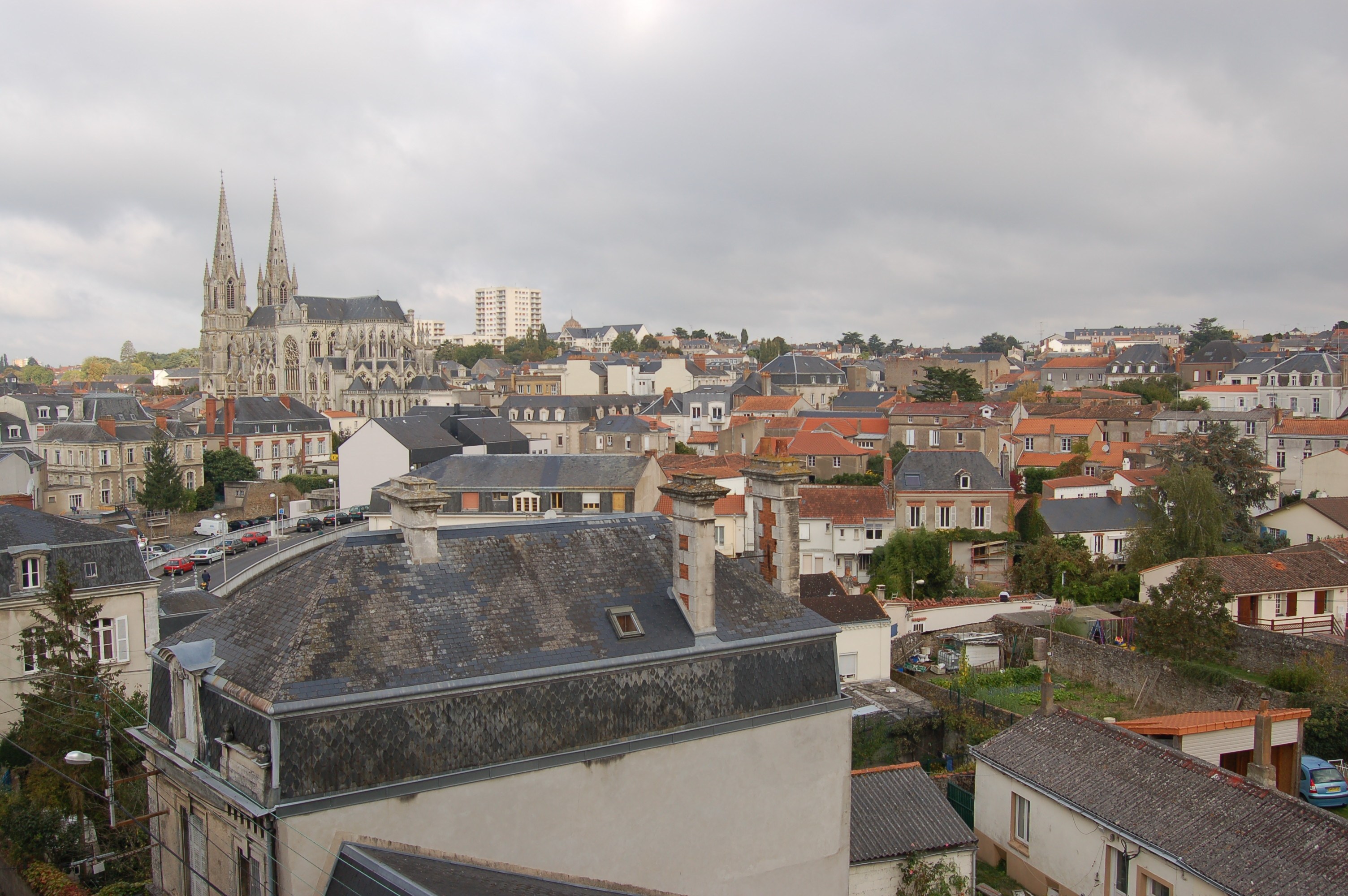

- Coat of arms
- Location of Cholet
- Location within France Location within Pays de la Loire
- Coordinates: 47°03′36″N 0°52′42″W
- Country: France
- Region: Pays de la Loire
- Department: Maine-et-Loire
- Arrondissement: Cholet
- Canton: Cholet-1 and 2
- Intercommunality: CA Cholet Agglomération

Government
  - Mayor (2021–2026): Gilles Bourdouleix (CNIP)
- Area^{1}: 87.47 km^{2} (33.77 sq mi)
- Elevation: 124 m (407 ft)
- Highest elevation: 184 m (604 ft)
- Lowest elevation: 63 m (207 ft)
- Population (2023): 54,404
  - Density: 622.0/km^{2} (1,611/sq mi)
- Time zone: UTC+01:00 (CET)
  - Summer (DST): UTC+02:00 (CEST)
- INSEE/Postal code: 49099 /49300
- ^{1} French Land Register data, which excludes lakes, ponds, glaciers > 1 km^{2} (0.386 sq mi or 247 acres) and river estuaries.

Cholet (French: [ʃɔlɛ], probably from Latin cauletum, "cabbage") is a commune of western France, in the Maine-et-Loire department. With 54,404 inhabitants (2023), it is the second most populous commune of Maine-et-Loire, after the prefecture, Angers.

== Geography ==
Cholet stands on an eminence on the right bank of the river Moine, which is crossed by a bridge from the fifteenth century. It is about 50 km southeast of Nantes. Cholet is the centre of the Cholet Agglomération with about 107,000 inhabitants. It is the seat of the arrondissement of Cholet and of the cantons Cholet-1 and Cholet-2.

== Climate ==
Climate data for Cholet (1991–2020 normals, extremes 1965–present)
Month	Jan	Feb	Mar	Apr	May	Jun	Jul	Aug	Sep	Oct	Nov	Dec	Year
Record high °C (°F)	17.3 (63.1)	22.7 (72.9)	23.6 (74.5)	28.3 (82.9)	31.1 (88.0)	41.7 (107.1)	41.3 (106.3)	38.9 (102.0)	34.3 (93.7)	30.4 (86.7)	21.7 (71.1)	18.2 (64.8)	41.7 (107.1)
Mean daily maximum °C (°F)	8.4 (47.1)	9.5 (49.1)	12.8 (55.0)	15.7 (60.3)	19.3 (66.7)	22.9 (73.2)	25.0 (77.0)	25.2 (77.4)	21.9 (71.4)	16.9 (62.4)	11.9 (53.4)	8.9 (48.0)	16.5 (61.7)
Daily mean °C (°F)	5.6 (42.1)	6.1 (43.0)	8.6 (47.5)	10.9 (51.6)	14.4 (57.9)	17.7 (63.9)	19.6 (67.3)	19.7 (67.5)	16.8 (62.2)	13.1 (55.6)	8.8 (47.8)	6.1 (43.0)	12.3 (54.1)
Mean daily minimum °C (°F)	2.9 (37.2)	2.6 (36.7)	4.4 (39.9)	6.1 (43.0)	9.5 (49.1)	12.5 (54.5)	14.1 (57.4)	14.2 (57.6)	11.6 (52.9)	9.4 (48.9)	5.7 (42.3)	3.3 (37.9)	8.0 (46.4)
Record low °C (°F)	−14.6 (5.7)	−12.9 (8.8)	−10.2 (13.6)	−3.6 (25.5)	−1.0 (30.2)	3.5 (38.3)	5.5 (41.9)	4.7 (40.5)	2.5 (36.5)	−3.1 (26.4)	−7.0 (19.4)	−9.9 (14.2)	−14.6 (5.7)
Average precipitation mm (inches)	83.3 (3.28)	62.3 (2.45)	57.7 (2.27)	56.9 (2.24)	64.0 (2.52)	40.2 (1.58)	49.1 (1.93)	46.1 (1.81)	62.3 (2.45)	79.7 (3.14)	84.6 (3.33)	86.3 (3.40)	772.5 (30.41)
Average precipitation days (≥ 1.0 mm)	12.3	10.2	9.2	9.4	9.7	7.2	6.7	6.7	7.8	10.4	12.7	12.5	114.8
Source: Meteociel

== History ==
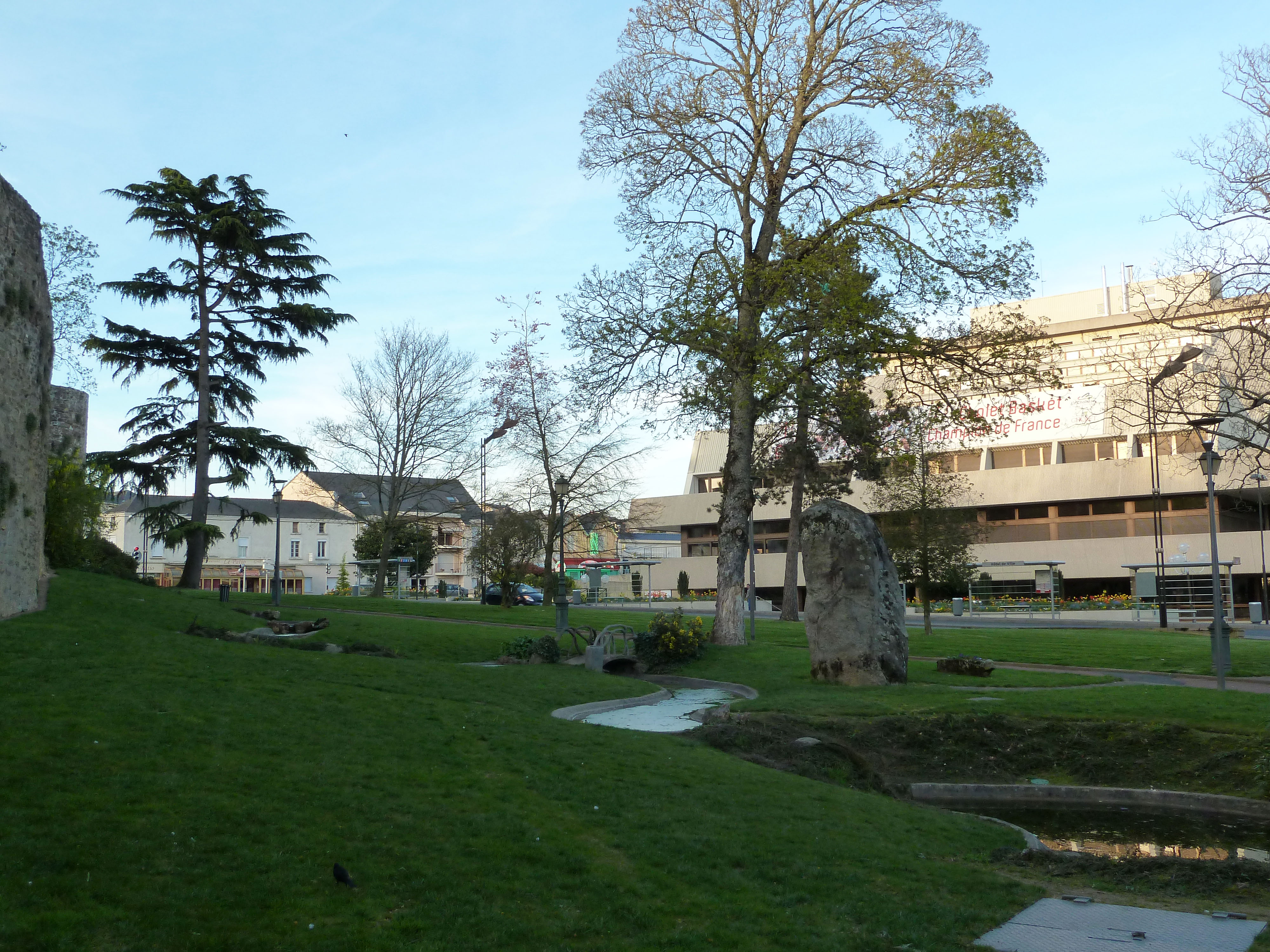
The Hôtel de Ville

Numerous discoveries make it possible to prove the existence of a prehistoric presence on the territory of the commune. There were found, in particular, several polishers and thirty-three polished stone axes. From the Neolithic period, there are only three menhirs left in Cholet: one located at a place called "la Garde", a second ("la Pierre Plate") at a place called "la Pochetière" and a third ("le Grand menhir de la Garde") moved to the Mail garden in Cholet in 1885. Four other menhirs at a place called "Gué-au-Boin" and a fifth at "La Bréchoire" have been destroyed or have disappeared.

The name of "De Cholet" family appears for the first time in the 11th century in the entourage of Lord Pierre I of Chemillé, who died in 1048. The first mention of a castle in Cholet dates from 1069.

The town owes the rise of its prosperity to the settlement of weavers there by Édouard Charles Victurnien Colbert, count of Maulévrier, a brother of the great Jean-Baptiste Colbert. It then became an estate of Gabriel-François de Rougé and marquess of Cholet, who developed the town and its economy. The main commercial mall, opened in 2009, is named after him: the "Arcades Rougé".

During the early years of the French revolutionary wars, the town found itself at the heart of the counter-revolutionary struggle in the Vendée, culminating in October 1793 with the Battle of Cholet which was won by the republicans and followed by a period of brutal government repression. Cholet suffered terrible destruction during the Vendée wars. The town was destroyed by 60 to 70% and lost 5,000 inhabitants, killed or missing, on a population of 8,400 to 8,500 before the conflict. On the edge of the inter-district road, near the aerodrome, a new monument commemorates this event in 1993 among six other crosses erected previously for the jubilee of 1850, four of which are still present on the public road.

One of Cholet's textile specialties is its famous red handkerchief, which has earned it the title of Handkerchief Capital. The history of this handkerchief goes back to the wars of Vendée: indeed, on 17 October 1793 the great battle of Cholet opposed, on one side, the Vendeans, with d'Elbée, Bonchamps, La Rochejaquelein and Stofflet. On the other hand stand the Republicans led by Beaupuy, Travot, Marceau, Kléber and the Mayençais. Henri de la Rochejaquelein wears on his hat, on his chest and at his side, three white handkerchiefs of Cholet, in order to better make himself recognized by his men, handkerchiefs which designate him just as surely with the republican balls. Having used one of these white handkerchiefs to bandage a wound, it turns red with its blood. Since then, the traditional handkerchief of Cholet created by a local industrialist, Léon Maret, is red with white stripes. He is the ambassador of Cholet.

According to the 10 January 1885 edition of Corbett's Herald, a temporary theatre had collapsed on an audience of 1,000, causing 150 fatalities. A new Hôtel de Ville (town hall) was opened in 1976.

== Demographics ==
The population data in the table and graph below refer to the commune of Cholet proper, in its geography at the given years. The commune of Cholet absorbed the former commune of Le Puy-Saint-Bonnet in 1973.

Historical population

Year	Pop.	±% p.a.
1793	8,444	—
1800	4,709	−8.00%
1806	4,746	+0.13%
1821	4,865	+0.17%
1831	7,345	+4.21%
1836	8,895	+3.90%
1841	8,413	−1.11%
1846	8,413	+0.00%
1851	10,385	+4.30%
1856	11,775	+2.54%
1861	12,735	+1.58%
1866	13,360	+0.96%
1872	13,552	+0.24%
1876	14,288	+1.33%
1881	15,916	+2.18%
1886	16,855	+1.15%
1891	16,891	+0.04%
1896	17,844	+1.10%
1901	19,352	+1.64%

Year	Pop.	±% p.a.
1906	20,427	+1.09%
1911	21,058	+0.61%
1921	19,542	−0.74%
1926	20,482	+0.94%
1931	21,711	+1.17%
1936	23,385	+1.50%
1946	26,086	+1.10%
1954	29,358	+1.49%
1962	36,565	+2.78%
1968	41,766	+2.24%
1975	52,976	+3.45%
1982	55,524	+0.67%
1990	55,132	−0.09%
1999	54,204	−0.19%
2007	54,371	+0.04%
2012	54,181	−0.07%
2017	53,917	−0.10%
2023	54,404	+0.15%

Source: EHESS and INSEE (1968-2023)

== Sights ==
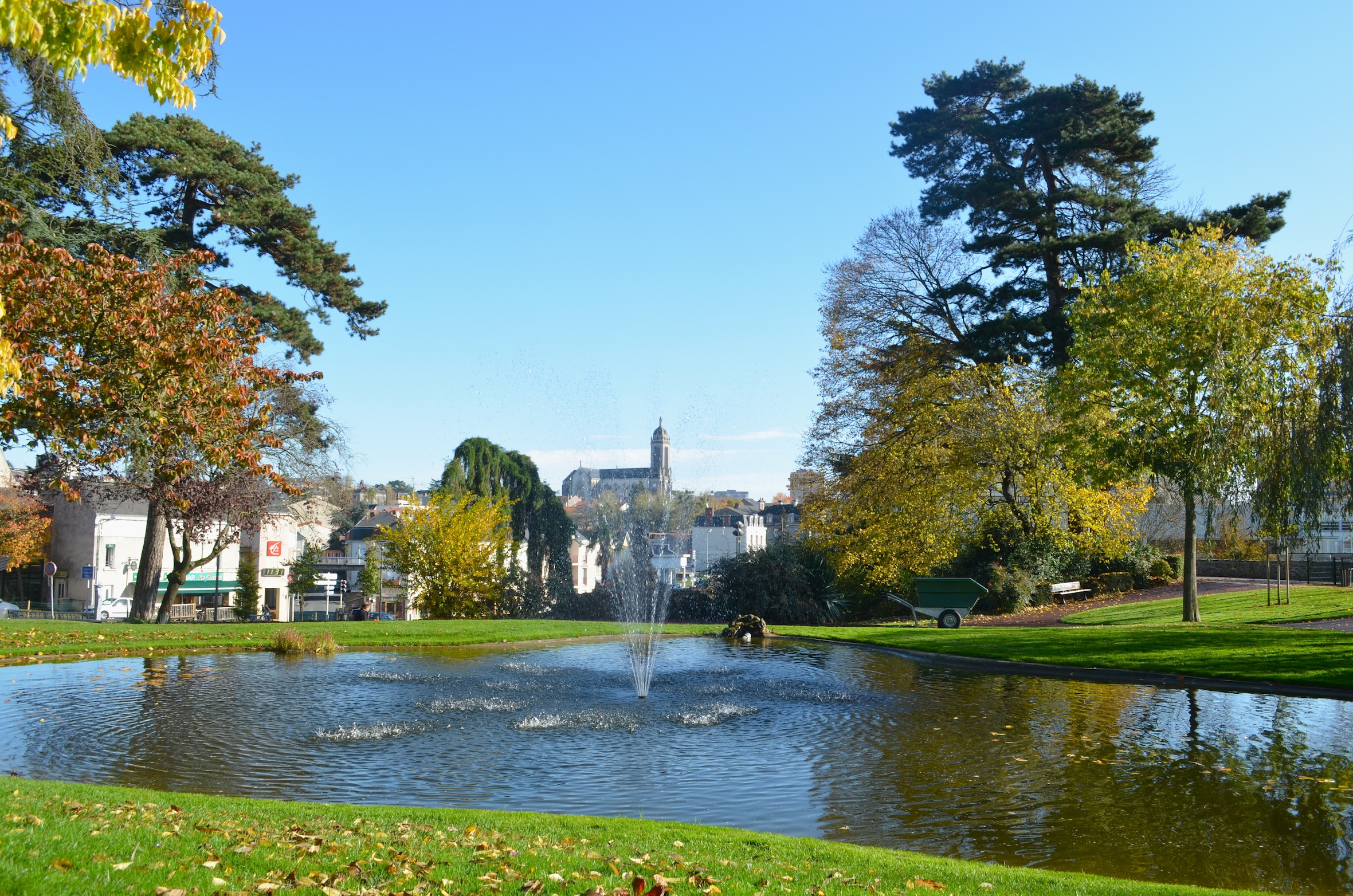
The Jardin du Mail

A public garden occupies the site of the old castle; the public buildings and churches, for example the Church of the Sacred Heart (église du Sacré-Cœur, 1939), are modern. The Church of the Sacred Heart is in the Byzantine Romanesque style and was the work of the local architect Maurice Laurentin.

The Church of Our Lady (église Notre-Dame) is listed as a "monument historique" (historic monument). In July 1813, the Duke of Angoulême laid the first stone of the current Our Lady church. From 1881 to 1900, the nave and the bell towers were completed, the spiers of which rise 65 meters above Place Travot.

The Church of St Peter (Saint-Pierre), St Peter street, exists from the 6th and 7th centuries in what is then the borough of Saint-Pierre. It was vandalized and destroyed by the Normans in the 15th century. After the year 1000, the monks of Marmoutier built a Romanesque-style church which was modified into Gothic at the end of the 15th century. Rebuilt from 1752, it kept a covered wooden gallery until 1850. The priest Bougère and the architect Tessier built the current church, the bell tower of which was completed in 1933. The statue of Saint Peter which overlooks the bell tower weighs 850 kilos.

The convent of St Francis of Assisi, Pasteur street, has been welcoming since 2002, in the former Carmel of Cholet founded in 1885 by Mother Marie de La Croix, a community of Franciscans belonging to the Provincial Custody of Saint-Bonaventure de France. You can admire in the choir of the convent chapel, an Annunciation by the artist Maurice Denis dating from 1930.

Megalithic monuments are numerous in the vicinity.

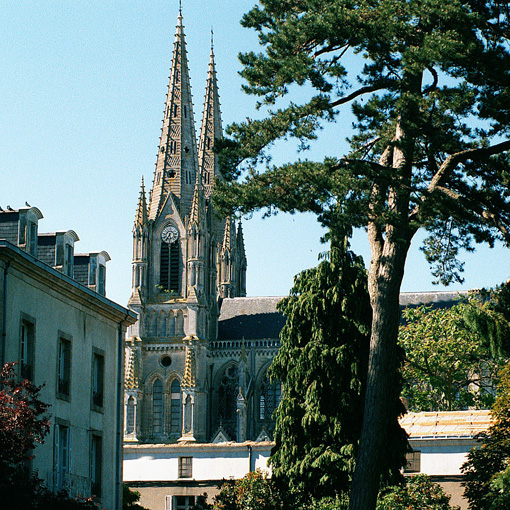
The church of Our Lady

A textile museum (Musée du Textile) exists to conserve the traditional machines used to create the famous handkerchiefs made in this town, as well as the techniques used to make them and the oral and local history associated with the industry.

== Economy ==
At the start of the 20th century, there were granite quarries in the vicinity of the town. The chief industry was the manufacture of linen and linen handkerchiefs, which was also carried on in the neighboring communes on a large scale. Woolen and cotton fabrics were also produced, and bleaching and the manufacture of preserved foods were carried on. Cholet was the most important center in France for the sale of fat cattle, sheep and pigs, for which Paris was the chief market.

Nowadays, despite its average size, the city is experiencing significant economic activity. The city sees the birth of many "small and medium-sized enterprises". It is the second industrial area in the region, after that of "Nantes−Saint-Nazaire". The unemployment rate is three points lower than the national average.

== Transport ==
The Gare de Cholet railway station offers regional services towards Nantes and Angers. The network of urban and periurban buses is provided by Choletbus. Cholet Aérodrome serves Cholet.

== Education ==
- École supérieure des sciences commerciales d'Angers

== Sport ==
SO Cholet is based in the commune as is Cholet Basket.

Cholet hosted Stage 4 (Individual Time Trial) and was the departure of Stage 5 in the 2008 Tour de France. It was scheduled to host a Team Time Trial stage in the 2018 Tour de France and Stage 3 of the 2018 Tour de France started and finished in Cholet.

In Cholet held annually in March the Grand Prix Cholet-Pays de la Loire, a single-day road bicycle race. Between 2004 and 2015 took place Cholet Pays de Loire Dames, a women's one day cycle race.

Cholet organized the French road cycling championships in 2022.

== Twin towns – sister cities ==
Cholet is twinned with:

- Oldenburg, Germany, since 1985
- Dorohoi, Romania
- Solihull, United Kingdom
- Dénia, Spain

== Notable people ==
- Kévin Barré (born 1990), footballer
- Gilbert Prouteau (1917–2012), poet and film director.
- François Morellet (1926–2016), painter, sculptor and light artist
- Antoine Rigaudeau (born 1971), basketball player
- Arthur Rogeon (born 2006), racing driver

== See also ==
- Communes of the Maine-et-Loire department
- First Battle of Cholet
- Second Battle of Cholet
