= Canton of Sèvremoine =

Administrative division of the Maine-et-Loire department, France

Coordinates: 47.12°N 0.99°W

The canton of Sèvremoine (before March 2020: canton of Saint-Macaire-en-Mauges) is an administrative division of the Maine-et-Loire department, in western France. It was created at the French canton reorganisation which came into effect in March 2015. Its seat is in Sèvremoine.

It consists of the following communes:

1. Le May-sur-Èvre
2. La Romagne
3. Saint-Christophe-du-Bois
4. Saint-Léger-sous-Cholet
5. La Séguinière
6. Sèvremoine
