= List of windmills in Maine-et-Loire =

A list of windmills in Maine-et-Loire, France.

Location	Name of mill	Type	Built	Notes	Photograph
Angers	Château d'Angers	Moulin Tour			
Angrie	Moulin Neuf	Moulin Tour	1861	Moulins-a-Vent (in French)	
Avrillé	Moulin de la Croix-Cadeau	Moulin Cavier	1730	Moulins-a-Vent (in French)	
Avrillé	Moulin de la Garde	Moulin Cavier	17th century	Moulins-a-Vent (in French)	
Beauvau	Moulin de Beauvau				
Bécon-les-Granits	Moulin de la Landronnière	Moulin Tour	1872	Moulins-a-Vent (in French)	
Bégrolles-en-Mauges	Moulin des Landes; Moulin Belle Fontaine				
Brissac-Quincé	Moulin du Pavé	Moulin Cavier	16th century	Moulins-a-Vent (in French)	
Broc		Moulin Tour			
Candé	Moulin de la Saulaie	Moulin Tour	18th century	Moulins-a-Vent (in French)	
Challain-la-Potherie	Moulin du Ratz	Moulin Tour	Early 19th century	Moulins-a-Vent (in French)	
Champtoceaux	Moulin de Champtoceaux	Moulin Tour		Moulins-a-Vent (in French)	
Chanteloup-les-Bois	Moulins de Péronne	Moulin Tours		Two mills	
Chanzeaux	Moulin de Chanzeaux	Moulin Cavier		Moulins-a-Vent (in French)	
Charcé-Saint-Ellier-sur-Aubance	Moulin Patouillet	Moulin Pivot		Moulins-a-Vent (in French)	
Chaudefonds-sur-Layon	Moulins de Poyeau	Moulin Tours		Two mills	
Chavagnes-les-Eaux	Moulin de Oisonnières				
Chavagnes-les-Eaux	Moulin de Milon	Moulin Cavier		Moulins-a-Vent (in French)	
Chenillé-Changé	Moulin Chenillé				
Cholet	Moulin Rue George Sand	Moulin Tour		Moulins-a-Vent (in French)	
Cholet	Moulin de Cholet	Moulin Tour		Moulins-a-Vent (in French)	
Concourson-sur-Layon	Moulin des Bleuces	Moulin Cavier	Late 17th or early 18th century	Moulins-a-Vent (in French)	
Coron	Moulin de la Noue Ronde	Moulin Tour		Moulins-a-Vent (in French)	
Coutures	Moulin du Pré	Moulin Tour		Moulins-a-Vent (in French)	
Dénezé-sous-Doué	Moulin des Vieillières				
Doué-la-Fontaine	Moulin de la Fourchette; Moulin Cartier	Moulin Tour	1909	Moulins-a-Vent (in French)	
Doué-la-Fontaine	Moulin de Fourchou	Moulin Cavier	1774	Moulins-a-Vent (in French)	
Doué-la-Fontaine	Moulin au Rue d'Amjou	Moulin Cavier		Moulins-a-Vent (in French)	
Doué-la-Fontaine	Moulin au Rue des Tilleuls	Moulin Cavier		Moulins-a-Vent (in French)	
Doué-la-Fontaine	Moulin au Rue du Soulanger	Moulin Cavier		Moulins-a-Vent (in French)	
Faye-d'Anjou	Moulin de la Pinsonnerie	Moulin Cavier	Late 18th century	Moulins-a-Vent (in French)	
Forges	Moulin de la Garde	Moulin Tour		Moulins-a-Vent (in French)	
Gennes	Moulin de la Madeleine	Moulin Tour		Moulins-a-Vent (in French)	
Gennes	Moulin de Bessé	Moulin Cavier		Moulins-a-Vent (in French)	
Grézillé	Moulin Gasté	Moulin Cavier		Moulins-a-Vent (in French)	
Ingrandes-sur-Loire	Moulin d'Ingrandes				
La Chapelle-Saint-Florent	Moulin de l'Épinay	Moulin Tour			
La Ménitré	Moulin de Goislard	Moulin Pivot		Moulins-a-Vent (in French)	
La Pommeraye	Moulin Bêne				
La Pommeraye	Moulin de la Roche Evière	Moulin Tour		Moulins-a-Vent (in French)	
La Pommeraye	Moulin de la Renardière	Moulin Tour		Moulins-a-Vent (in French)	
La Possonnière	Moulin de la Roche; Moulin de la Franchaie	Moulin Tour			
La Pouëze	Moulin de la Lande	Moulin Pivot		Ruin	
Les Rosiers-sur-Loire	Moulin des Basses Terres	Moulin Tour	Early 18th century	Moulins-a-Vent (in French)	
Le Thoureil	Moulin de Bessé				
Liré	Moulin de la Turmelière				
Louerre	Moulin Guignechien				
Louresse-Rochemenier	Moulin Gouré	Moulin Cavier	16th or 17th century	Moulins-a-Vent (in French)	
Louresse-Rochemenier	Moulin Garaud	Moulin Cavier		Moulins-a-Vent (in French)	
Montfaucon-Montigné	Moulin de Montfaucon	Moulin Tour		Moulins-a-Vent (in French)	
Montfort	Moulin de Montfort	Moulin Tour		Moulins-a-Vent (in French)	
Montigné-sur-Moine	Moulin des Grands Jardins				
Montreuil-Bellay	Moulin des Rochettes	Moulin Tour		Moulins-a-Vent (in French)	
Montreuil-Bellay	Moulin de Montreuil-Bellay #1	Moulin Cavier		Moulins-a-Vent (in French)	
Montreuil-Bellay	Moulin de Montreuil-Bellay #2	Moulin Cavier		Moulins-a-Vent (in French)	
Montsoreau	Moulin de la Perruche	Moulin Cavier		Moulins-a-Vent (in French)	
Montsoreau	Moulin de la Tranchée	Moulin Cavier	18th century	Moulins-a-Vent (in French)	
Mozé-sur-Louet	Moulin de la Bigottière	Moulin Cavier	1750	Moulins-a-Vent (in French)	
Parnay	Moulin de Béniquet	Moulin Cavier		Moulins-a-Vent (in French)	
Rochefort-sur-Loire	Moulin de Piëgu				
Rochefort-sur-Loire	Moulin de Chauvigne	Moulin Cavier		Moulins-a-Vent (in French)	
Rochefort-sur-Loire	Moulin de Sainte Catherine; Moulin de Piedgüe	Moulin Cavier		Moulins-a-Vent (in French)	
Rochefort-sur-Loire	Moulin Géant; Moulin de la Pierre Blanche				
Saint-Barthélemy-d'Anjou	Moulin des Hardouinières				
Saint-Georges-des-Sept-Voies	Moulin de la Lussière	Moulin Tour		Moulins-a-Vent (in French)	
Saint-Georges-des-Sept-Voies	Moulin du St Georges	Moulin Cavier		Moulins-a-Vent (in French)	
Saint-Georges-des-Sept-Voies	Moulin de l'Echaudiet	Moulin Cavier		Moulins-a-Vent (in French)	
Saint-Georges-des-Sept-Voies		Éolienne Bollée			
Saint-Georges-sur-Loire	Moulin de la Salle	Moulin Tour		Moulins-a-Vent (in French)	
Saint-Germain-sur-Moine	Moulin de St Germain	Moulin Tour		Moulins-a-Vent (in French)	
Saint-Jean-des-Mauvrets	Moulin du Pavé	Moulin Cavier			
Saint-Rémy-la-Varenne	Moulin de Bourgdion; Moulin de la Forêt	Moulin Cavier			
Saint-Saturnin-sur-Loire	Moulin des Quatre-Croix	Moulin Cavier	Late 18th or early 19th century	Moulins-a-Vent (in French)	
Saint-Saturnin-sur-Loire	Grand Moulin	Moulin Tour		Moulins-a-Vent (in French)	
Saint-Saturnin-sur-Loire	Moulin Denneron				
Saint-Saturnin-sur-Loire	Moulin des Girault				
Saumur	Moulins du Belvédère			Two mills	
Savennières	Moulin de Beaupréau	Moulin Tour		Moulins-a-Vent (in French)	
Savennières	Moulin du Fresne; Moulin de la Petite Roche	Moulin Cavier	18th century	Moulins-a-Vent (in French)	
Thouarcé	Moulin de la Montagne	Moulin Cavier	18th century	Moulins-a-Vent (in French)	
Tillières	Moulin Guillou	Moulin Tour	1860	Moulins-a-Vent (in French)	
Trélazé	Moulin de l'Union	Moulin Cavier			
Turquant	Moulin de la Herpinière	Moulin Cavier	16th century	Moulins-a-Vent (in French)	
Turquant	Moulin du Val Hulin	Moulin Cavier	1749	Moulins-a-Vent (in French)	
Valanjou	Moulin des Armenaux	Moulin Cavier	Early 19th century	Moulins-a-Vent (in French)	
Valanjou	Moulin de Gué Robert	Moulin Cavier	Early 19th century	Moulins-a-Vent (in French)	
Valanjou	Moulin des Verzeaux	Moulin Cavier		Moulins-a-Vent (in French)	
Varennes-sur-Loire	Moulin du Champ des Isles	Moulin Cavier		Moulins-a-Vent (in French)	
Varennes-sur-Loire	Moulin de la Croix des Noues	Moulin Cavier		Moulins-a-Vent (in French)	
