= Renée Bordereau =

French soldier

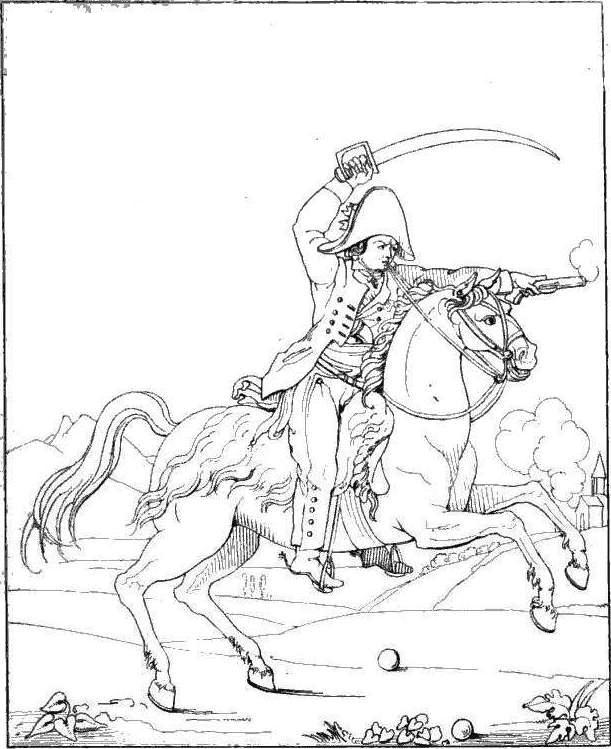
Cover image of Bordereau's memoirs

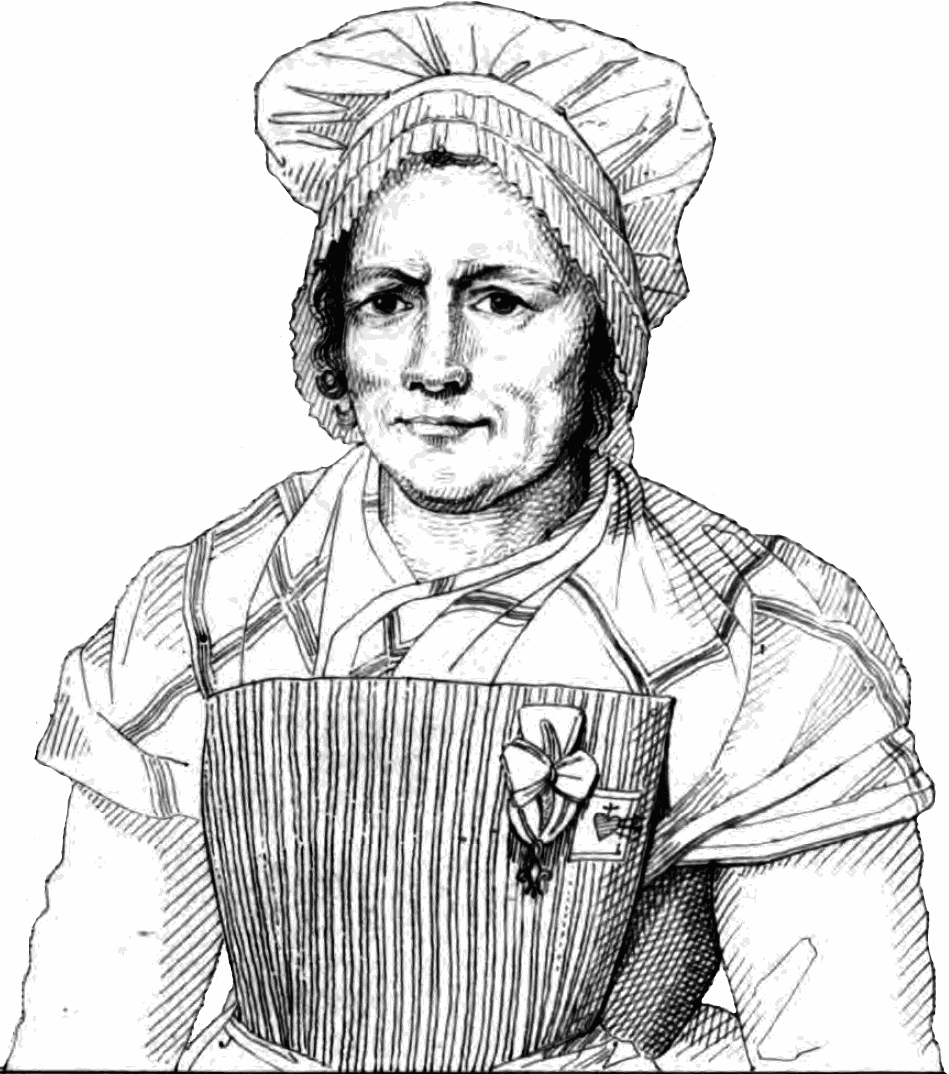
Renée Bordereau, probably 1814, copperplate engraving

Renée Bordereau (1770 in Soulaines-sur-Aubance – 1822 in Vezins, Maine-et-Loire), nicknamed The Angevin, was a French soldier. She followed her father, disguised herself as a man, and fought as a Royalist cavalier in the troops of Charles Melchior Artus de Bonchamps during the Vendéan insurrection against the French Revolution, and took part in all battles of the war.

== Early life ==
She was born to peasant family south of Angers, France. She may have done some smuggling during her youth, carrying illegal salt between Maine and Brittany.

Her father was part of the riots of the Revolution and as result, was later executed by revolutionaries in December 1793.

== Career ==
She enlisted in the rebel army dressed as a man. She is reputed to have killed some 20 of the opposing revolutionary army, the Bleues including slitting the neck of her own uncle who was a republican. A unit led by her threw 600 Republican soldiers from the heights of Roche-de-Mûrs in the commune of Mûrs-Erigné, south of the town of Angers, Pays de la Loire, into the Louet River below.

Her effectiveness as a soldier is attested by independent sources, including Madame de La Rochejaquelein, who reported "She was of ordinary height and very ugly. One day at Cholet, they pointed her out to me. 'See that soldier who has sleeves of a color different from his coat. That's a girl who fights like a lion.'... Her unbelievable courage was celebrated throughout the whole army."

On one of her own experiences, Bordereau wrote:

"Arriving near the Loire, I destroyed five of my enemies, and finishing off the day, I broke my sword on the head of the last one... Seeing only one horseman near me, I doubled back to our army. I alone, killed 21 that day. I'm not the one who counted them, but those who followed me, and if they hadn't said so, I wouldn't have spoken about it myself."

== Quotes ==
- "Renée Bordereau, whose father was butchered before her eyes, and who lost 42 relatives in the civil war of La Vendee; during the course of six years fought in more than 200 battles, on foot and on horseback, with the most determined intrepidity. In one battle she killed 21 of the enemy. She liberated 50 priests at one time and 800 at another, all of whom would have been executed. A price of 40,000 francs was set on her head. She was thrown into prison for a crime for which she could only prove her innocence by a discovery of her sex, where she remained five years, until the accession of Louis Eighteenth to the throne of France."
