= Galiot =

Ship type

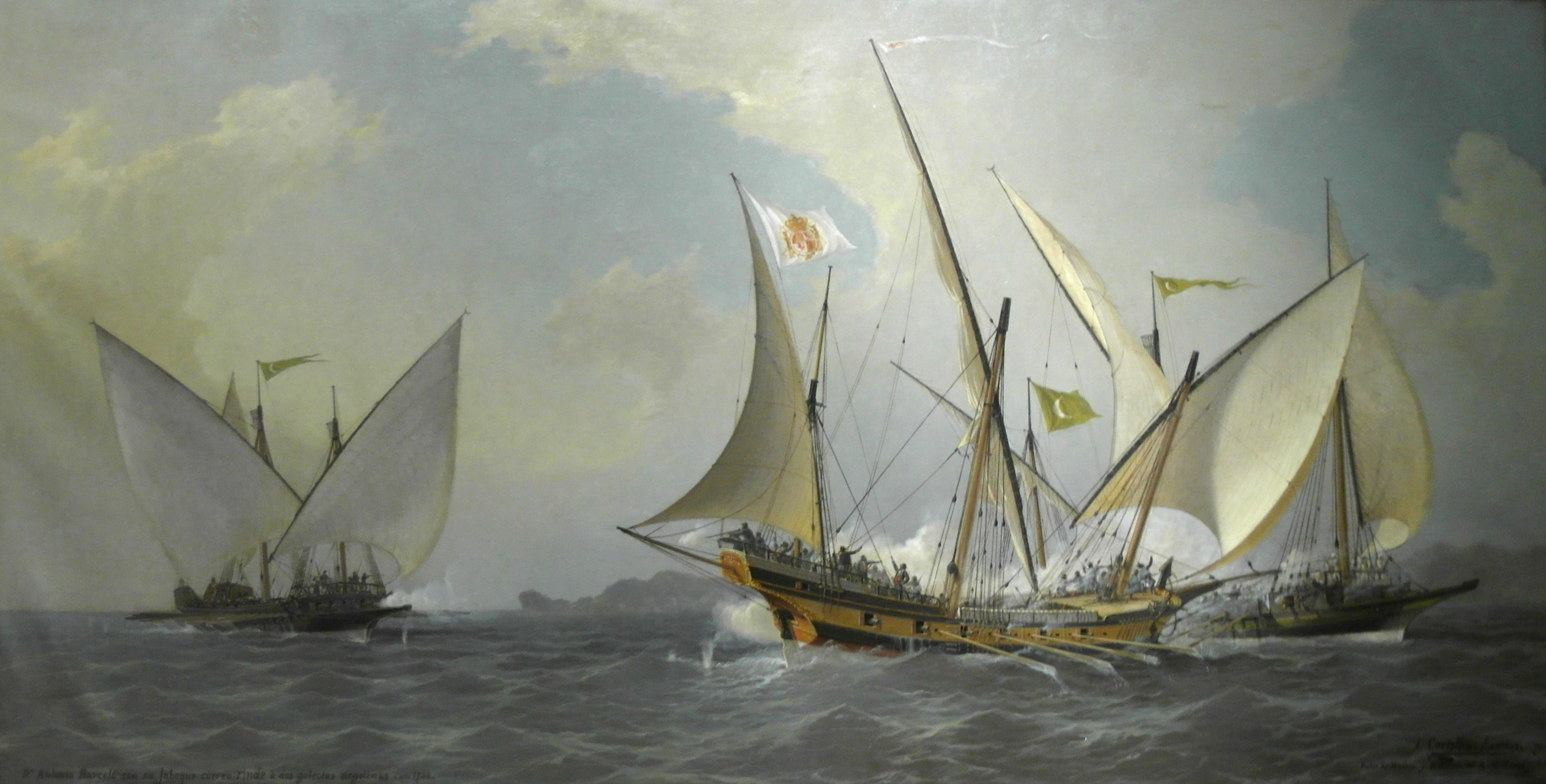
The Spanish xebec of Antonio Barceló (center) fighting two Algerian galiotes (1738)

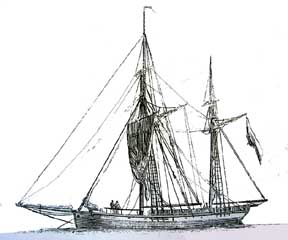
A Dutch galiot from Willaumez's Dictionnaire de la Marine in the 17th century

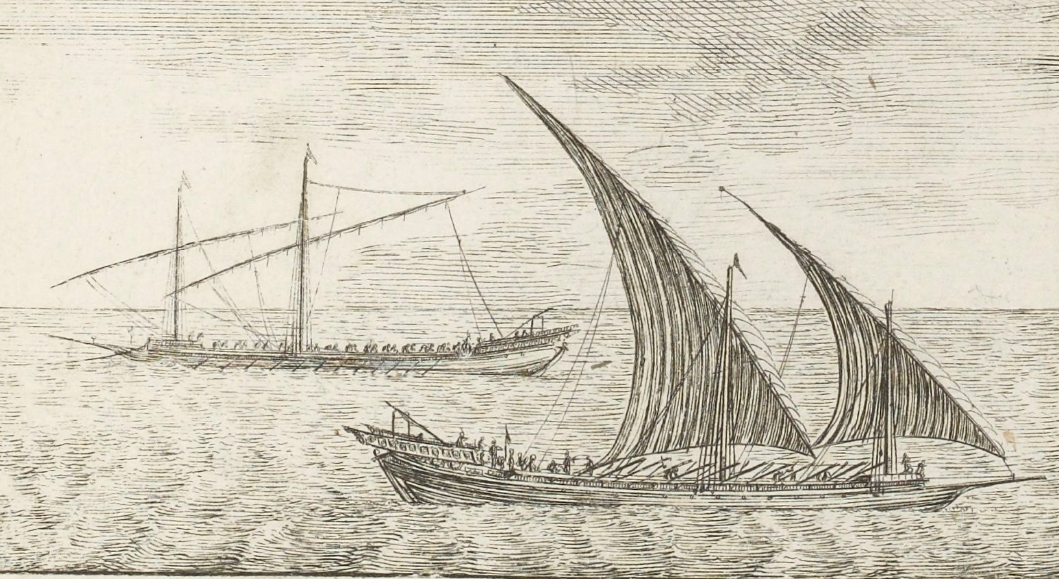
18th century half galleys

A galiot, galliot or galiote, was a small galley boat propelled by sail or oars. There are three different types of naval galiot that sailed on different seas.

A galiote was a type of French flat-bottom river boat or barge and also a flat-bottomed boat with a simple sail for transporting wine.

== Naval vessels ==
- Mediterranean (16th–17th centuries)

Historically, a galiot was a type of ship with oars, also known as a half-galley, then, from the 17th century forward, a ship with sails and oars. As used by the Barbary pirates against the Republic of Venice, a galiot had two masts and about 16 pairs of oars. Warships of the type typically carried between two and ten cannons of small caliber, and between 50 and 150 men. It was a Barbary galiot, captained by Barbarossa I, that captured two Papal vessels in 1504.

- North Sea (17th–19th centuries)

A galiot was a type of Dutch or German merchant ship of 20 to 400 tons (bm), similar to a ketch, with a rounded fore and aft like a fluyt. Galiots had nearly flat bottoms to sail in shallow waters. These ships were especially favoured for coastal navigation in the North and Baltic seas. To avoid excessive leeway, or leeward drift due to their flat bottoms, smaller vessels were usually fitted with leeboards. After 1830, a modernised type of galiot was developed that featured a sharper bow similar to a schooner. These vessels rarely had leeboards.

- Naval ships (17th–19th centuries)

A galiote (or galiot) was a French type of naval warship that might have two masts with lateen sails and a bank of oars. It might also be relatively small with only one mast, and be little more than a large chaloupe or launch.

A galiote a bombes was a French term for a galiote armed with a mortar and functioning as a bomb vessel, i.e., a vessel armed to shell coastal forts, towns, and the like.

== Canal and river boats ==
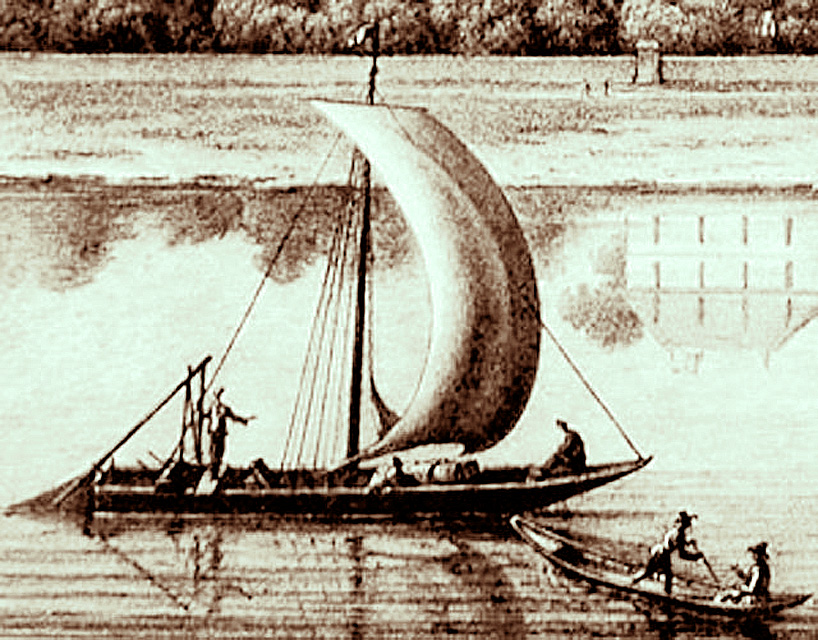
A galiote, or scute, transporting wine on a French river during the 18th century

- A galiote was a horse-drawn barge pulled along canals or rivers banks, which were popular in France from the mid-17th century through the 19th century.
- A galiote, or scute, also was a type of flat-bottomed boat with a simple sail that traveled French rivers transporting wine in the Anjou region as far as Les Ponts-de-Cé.

== See also ==
- Periagua
- Chaika (boat)
- Flatboat
- Warship

== General and cited references ==
- Carse, Philip (1959). The Age of Piracy. Hale.
- Jonas, Wolfgang (1990). Nordfriesisches Schiffahrtsmuseum Husum (ed.). Schiffbau in Nordfriesland [Shipbuilding in North Frisia]. Schriftenreihe des Nordfriesischen Schiffahrtsmuseums Husum (in German). Vol. 1. Husum Druck- und Verlagsgesellschaft. pp. 38–39. ISBN 3-88042-522-1.
- Poitrineau, Abel (1989). La Loire – les peuples du fleuve. Ed. Horvath, Saint-Etienne.
- Winfield, Rif & Stephen S. Roberts (2015). French Warships in the Age of Sail 1786–1861: Design Construction, Careers and Fates. Seaforth Publishing. ISBN 9781848322042.
