= Saint-Maur-sur-Loire =

Coordinates: 47°23′28″N 0°16′55″W

Saint-Maur-sur-Loire (French pronunciation: [sɛ̃ mɔʁ syʁ lwaʁ], lit. 'Saint Maur on Loire') is a village of western France in the département of Maine-et-Loire on the river Loire, part of the commune of Gennes-Val-de-Loire, about 15 mi (24 km) downstream from Saumur.

== History ==
Here, according to the Vita Sancti Mauri, Saint Maurus founded towards the middle of the 6th century Glanfeuil Abbey, the first Benedictine monastery in Gaul.

It was later reduced to ruins, refounded in the 9th century, before being again destroyed by the Normans; in anticipation of the disaster the relics of the saint were transferred to the abbey of Fosses (afterwards Saint-Maur-des-Fossés). Saint-Maur-sur-Loire was afterwards restored and fortified; the extant remains consist of a part of the church (12th and 17th centuries) and buildings of the 17th and 18th centuries.

Saint-Maur was an independent commune until 1840, when it became part of Saint-Georges-des-Sept-Voies. In 1873, it became part of Le Thoureil, which was merged into Gennes-Val-de-Loire in 2016.

== Sources and references ==
- Catholic Encyclopaedia- Odo of Glanfeuil
