= Saint-Sulpice, Maine-et-Loire =

Saint-Sulpice
- Part of Blaison-Saint-Sulpice
- Location of Saint-Sulpice
- Location within France Location within Pays de la Loire
- Coordinates: 47°24′03″N 0°24′57″W
- Country: France
- Region: Pays de la Loire
- Department: Maine-et-Loire
- Arrondissement: Angers
- Canton: Les Ponts-de-Cé
- Commune: Blaison-Saint-Sulpice
- Area^{1}: 2.9 km^{2} (1.1 sq mi)
- Elevation: 25 m (82 ft)
- Highest elevation: 80 m (260 ft)
- Lowest elevation: 18 m (59 ft)
- Population (2022): 204
  - Density: 70/km^{2} (180/sq mi)
- Time zone: UTC+01:00 (CET)
  - Summer (DST): UTC+02:00 (CEST)
- Postal code: 49320
- ^{1} French Land Register data, which excludes lakes, ponds, glaciers > 1 km^{2} (0.386 sq mi or 247 acres) and river estuaries.

Saint-Sulpice (French pronunciation: [sɛ̃ sylpis]) is a former commune in the Maine-et-Loire department in western France. On 1 January 2016, it was merged into the new commune of Blaison-Saint-Sulpice. Its population was 204 in 2022.

== See also ==
- Communes of the Maine-et-Loire department
