= Charcé-Saint-Ellier-sur-Aubance =

- Part of Brissac Loire Aubance
- Location of Charcé-Saint-Ellier-sur-Aubance
- Location within France Location within Pays de la Loire
- Coordinates: 47°21′24″N 0°24′33″W
- Country: France
- Region: Pays de la Loire
- Department: Maine-et-Loire
- Arrondissement: Angers
- Canton: Les Ponts-de-Cé
- Commune: Brissac Loire Aubance
- Area^{1}: 16.84 km^{2} (6.50 sq mi)
- Highest elevation: 90 m (300 ft)
- Lowest elevation: 36 m (118 ft)
- Population (2022): 731
  - Density: 43.4/km^{2} (112/sq mi)
- Demonym(s): Charcéen, Charcéenne
- Time zone: UTC+01:00 (CET)
  - Summer (DST): UTC+02:00 (CEST)
- Postal code: 49320
- ^{1} French Land Register data, which excludes lakes, ponds, glaciers > 1 km^{2} (0.386 sq mi or 247 acres) and river estuaries.

Charcé-Saint-Ellier-sur-Aubance (French pronunciation: [ʃaʁse sɛ̃.t‿elje syʁ obɑ̃s]) is a former French commune located in the department of Maine-et-Loire, in area Pays de la Loire. On 15 December 2016, it was merged into the new commune Brissac Loire Aubance.

The town was formed in 1973 from the merger of the former municipalities of Charcé and Saint-Ellier.

== Geography ==
Charcé-Saint-Ellier-sur-Aubance is located a few kilometers east of Brissac-Quince.

== See also ==
- Communes of the Maine-et-Loire department
