= Vauchrétien =

- Part of Brissac Loire Aubance
- Location of Vauchrétien
- Location within France Location within Pays de la Loire
- Coordinates: 47°20′01″N 0°28′31″W
- Country: France
- Region: Pays de la Loire
- Department: Maine-et-Loire
- Arrondissement: Angers
- Canton: Les Ponts-de-Cé
- Commune: Brissac Loire Aubance
- Area^{1}: 19.73 km^{2} (7.62 sq mi)
- Highest elevation: 92 m (302 ft)
- Lowest elevation: 29 m (95 ft)
- Population (2022): 1,574
  - Density: 79.78/km^{2} (206.6/sq mi)
- Demonym(s): Valchristinois, Valchristinoise
- Time zone: UTC+01:00 (CET)
  - Summer (DST): UTC+02:00 (CEST)
- Postal code: 49320
- ^{1} French Land Register data, which excludes lakes, ponds, glaciers > 1 km^{2} (0.386 sq mi or 247 acres) and river estuaries.

Vauchrétien (French pronunciation: [vokʁetjɛ̃]) is a former commune in the Maine-et-Loire department in western France. On 15 December 2016, it was merged into the new commune Brissac Loire Aubance.

== See also ==
- Communes of the Maine-et-Loire department
