= Bordereau =

Bordereau may also refer to:

- Renée Bordereau, a French female soldier
- An important document in the Dreyfus Affair
- A detailed statement provided by a reinsured company or delegated authority holder to a Reinsurance or insurance company.
