= Blaison-Gohier =

- Part of Blaison-Saint-Sulpice
- Location of Blaison-Gohier
- Location within France Location within Pays de la Loire
- Coordinates: 47°24′02″N 0°22′12″W
- Country: France
- Region: Pays de la Loire
- Department: Maine-et-Loire
- Arrondissement: Angers
- Canton: Les Ponts-de-Cé
- Commune: Blaison-Saint-Sulpice
- Area^{1}: 21.45 km^{2} (8.28 sq mi)
- Elevation: 35 m (115 ft)
- Highest elevation: 91 m (299 ft)
- Lowest elevation: 18 m (59 ft)
- Population (2022): 1,113
  - Density: 51.89/km^{2} (134.4/sq mi)
- Time zone: UTC+01:00 (CET)
  - Summer (DST): UTC+02:00 (CEST)
- Postal code: 49320
- ^{1} French Land Register data, which excludes lakes, ponds, glaciers > 1 km^{2} (0.386 sq mi or 247 acres) and river estuaries.

Blaison-Gohier (French pronunciation: [blɛzɔ̃ ɡɔje]) is a former commune in the Maine-et-Loire department in western France. It was created in 1974 by the merger of the former communes Blaison and Gohier. On 1 January 2016, it was merged into the new commune of Blaison-Saint-Sulpice.

== Population ==
Historical population
Year	Pop.	±% p.a.
1975	658	—
1982	800	+2.83%
1990	863	+0.95%
1999	951	+1.08%
2013	1,045	+0.68%
2022	1,113	+0.70%
Source: EHESS and INSEE

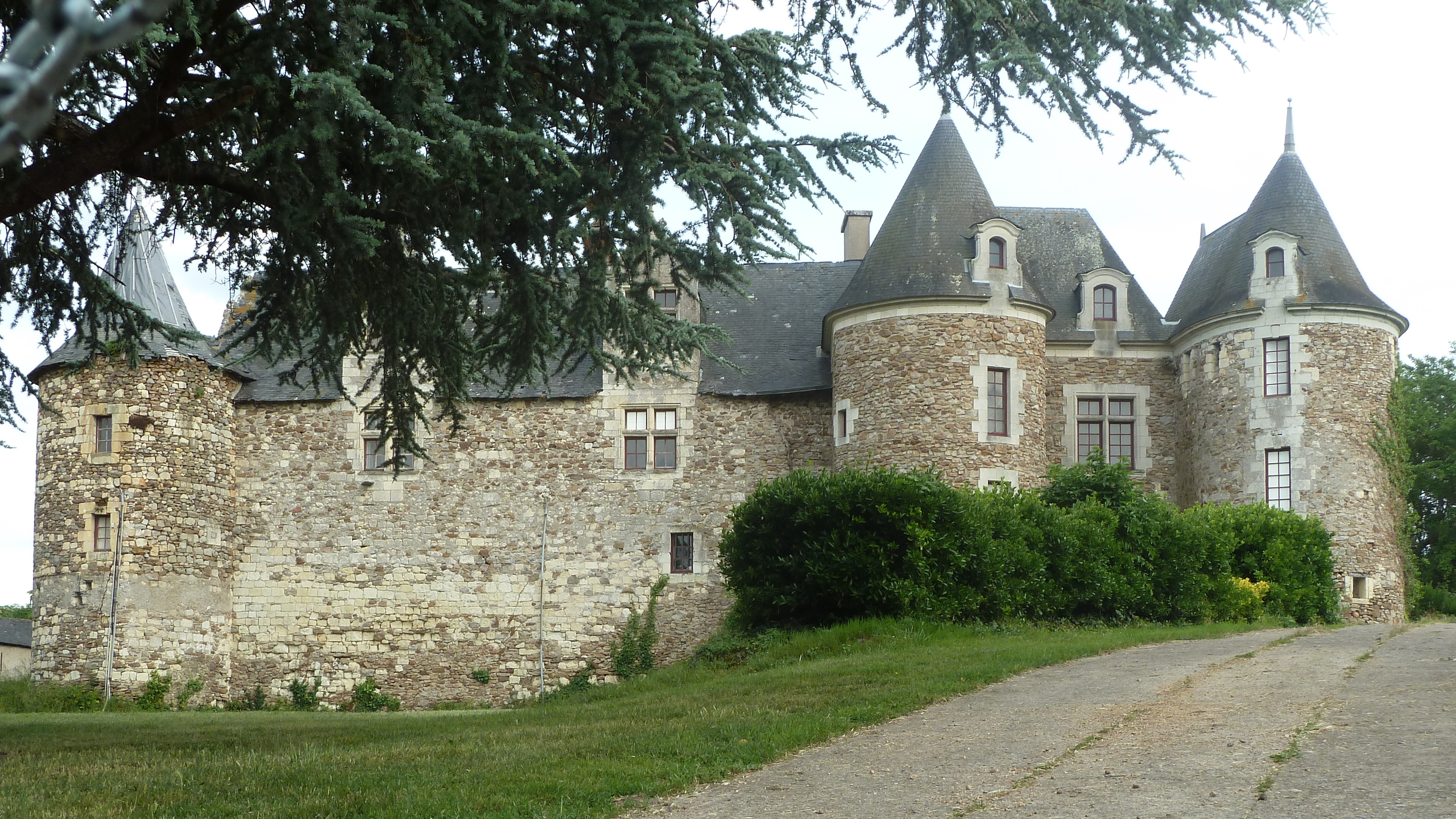
Castle of Blaison

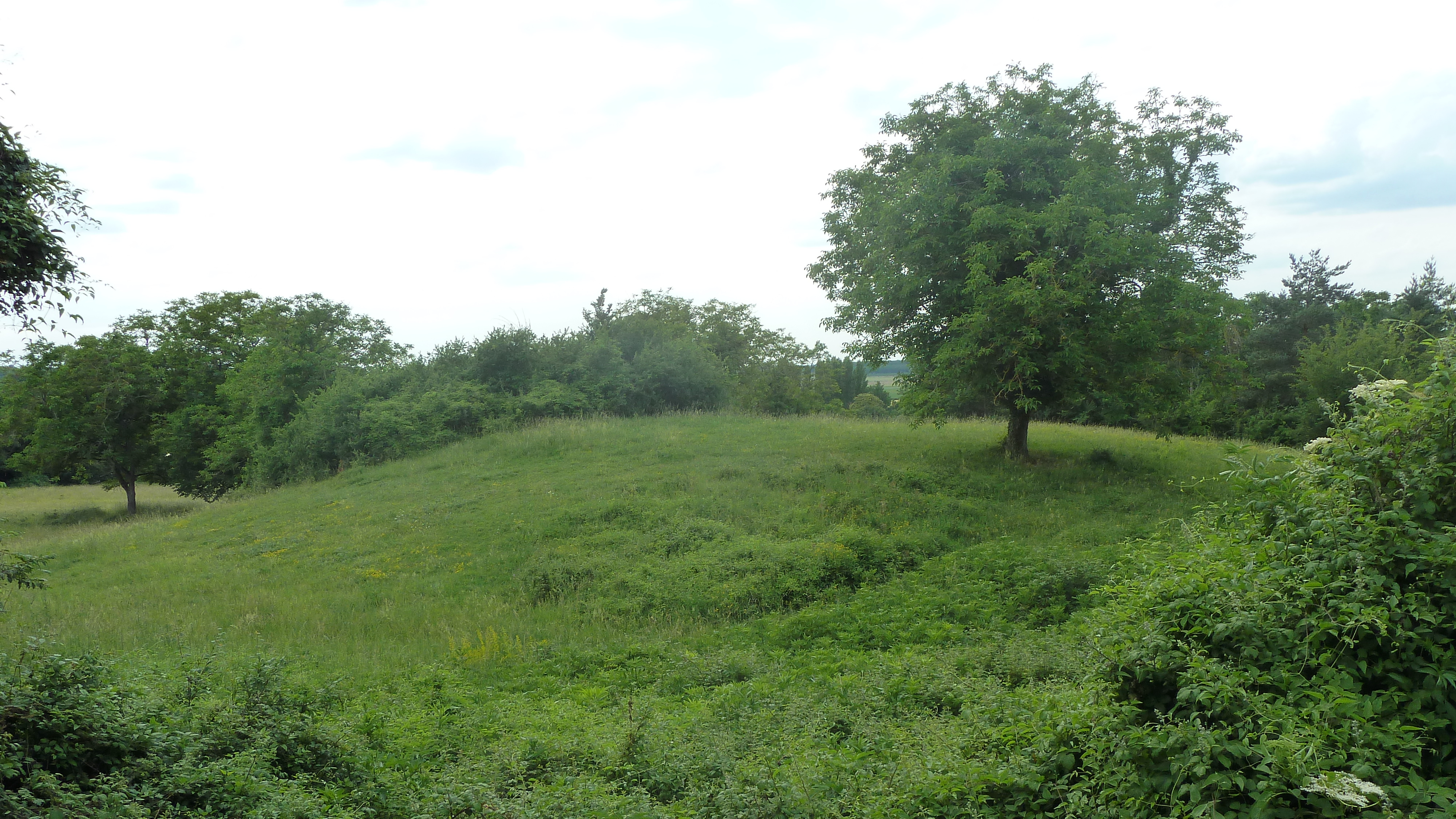
Motte-and-bailey of Blaison, before the castle

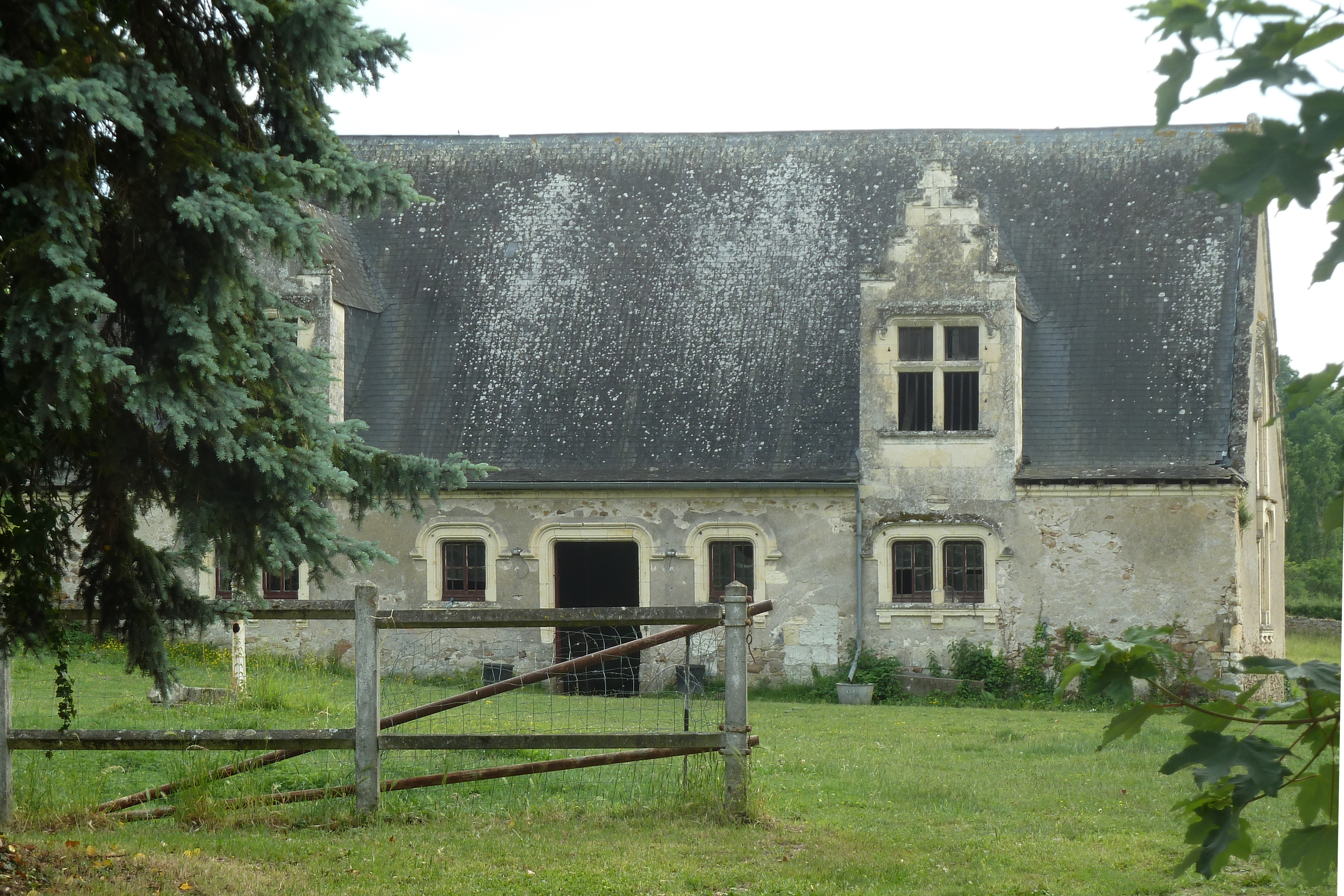
Tithe barn of Blaison

== See also ==
- Communes of the Maine-et-Loire department
