= Luigné =

- Part of Brissac Loire Aubance
- Location of Luigné
- Location within France Location within Pays de la Loire
- Coordinates: 47°17′09″N 0°23′27″W
- Country: France
- Region: Pays de la Loire
- Department: Maine-et-Loire
- Arrondissement: Angers
- Canton: Les Ponts-de-Cé
- Commune: Brissac Loire Aubance
- Area^{1}: 9.58 km^{2} (3.70 sq mi)
- Highest elevation: 82 m (269 ft)
- Lowest elevation: 56 m (184 ft)
- Population (2022): 294
  - Density: 30.7/km^{2} (79.5/sq mi)
- Demonym(s): Luignois, Luignoise
- Time zone: UTC+01:00 (CET)
  - Summer (DST): UTC+02:00 (CEST)
- Postal code: 49320
- ^{1} French Land Register data, which excludes lakes, ponds, glaciers > 1 km^{2} (0.386 sq mi or 247 acres) and river estuaries.

Luigné (French pronunciation: [lɥiɲe]) is a former commune in the Maine-et-Loire department in western France. On 15 December 2016, it was merged into the new commune Brissac Loire Aubance.

== See also ==
- Communes of the Maine-et-Loire department
