= Les Alleuds, Maine-et-Loire =

Les Alleuds
- Part of Brissac Loire Aubance
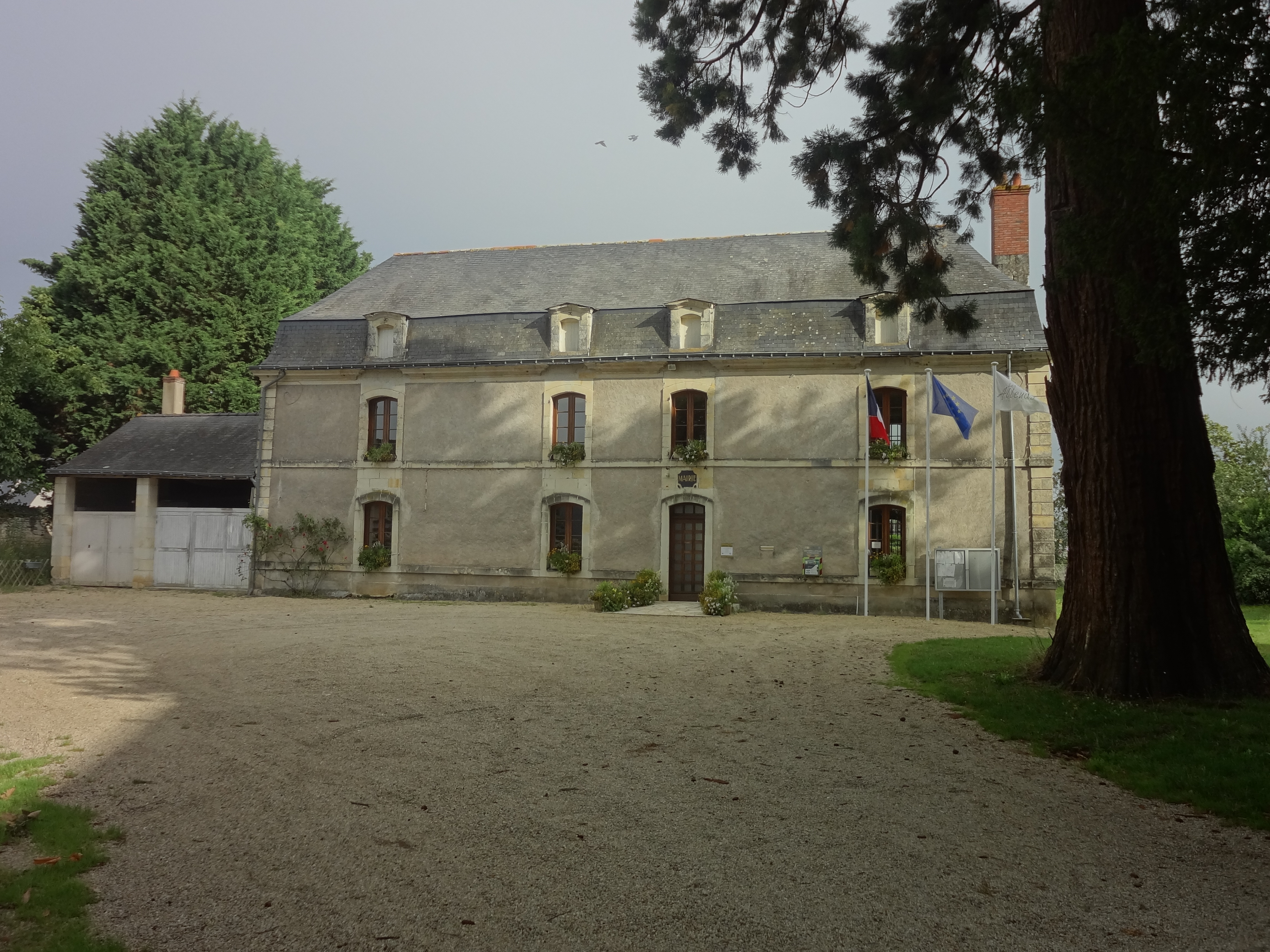
- The town hall of Les Alleuds
- Location of Les Alleuds
- Location within France Location within Pays de la Loire
- Coordinates: 47°19′13″N 0°24′30″W
- Country: France
- Region: Pays de la Loire
- Department: Maine-et-Loire
- Arrondissement: Angers
- Canton: Les Ponts-de-Cé
- Commune: Brissac Loire Aubance
- Area^{1}: 10.47 km^{2} (4.04 sq mi)
- Elevation: 69 m (226 ft)
- Highest elevation: 73 m (240 ft)
- Lowest elevation: 49 m (161 ft)
- Population (2023): 919
  - Density: 87.8/km^{2} (227/sq mi)
- Time zone: UTC+01:00 (CET)
  - Summer (DST): UTC+02:00 (CEST)
- Postal code: 49320
- ^{1} French Land Register data, which excludes lakes, ponds, glaciers > 1 km^{2} (0.386 sq mi or 247 acres) and river estuaries.

Les Alleuds (French pronunciation: [le.z‿alø]) is a former commune in the Maine-et-Loire department in western France. On 15 December 2016, it was merged into the new commune Brissac Loire Aubance.

== See also ==
- Communes of the Maine-et-Loire department
