= Juigné-sur-Loire =

- Part of Les Garennes sur Loire
- Location of Juigné-sur-Loire
- Location within France Location within Pays de la Loire
- Coordinates: 47°24′00″N 0°29′00″W
- Country: France
- Region: Pays de la Loire
- Department: Maine-et-Loire
- Arrondissement: Angers
- Canton: Les Ponts-de-Cé
- Commune: Les Garennes sur Loire
- Area^{1}: 12.49 km^{2} (4.82 sq mi)
- Highest elevation: 66 m (217 ft)
- Lowest elevation: 16 m (52 ft)
- Population (2022): 2,801
  - Density: 224.3/km^{2} (580.8/sq mi)
- Demonym(s): Juignéen, Juignéenne
- Time zone: UTC+01:00 (CET)
  - Summer (DST): UTC+02:00 (CEST)
- Postal code: 49610
- ^{1} French Land Register data, which excludes lakes, ponds, glaciers > 1 km^{2} (0.386 sq mi or 247 acres) and river estuaries.

Juigné-sur-Loire (French pronunciation: [ʒɥiɲe syʁ lwaʁ], literally Juigné on Loire) is a former commune in the Maine-et-Loire department in western France. On 15 December 2016 it was merged into the new commune Les Garennes sur Loire.

On 18 July 1969 Juigné-sur-Loire was the site of a tragic accident that killed 19 young teenagers from nearby Angers. The children, part of a group of sixty 13- and 14-year-olds on an outing from a recreational center, had been wading in the Loire river when the gravel riverbed beneath them gave way and swept them downstream into the deeper waters.

== See also ==
- Communes of the Maine-et-Loire department
