= Les Garennes sur Loire =

- Commune
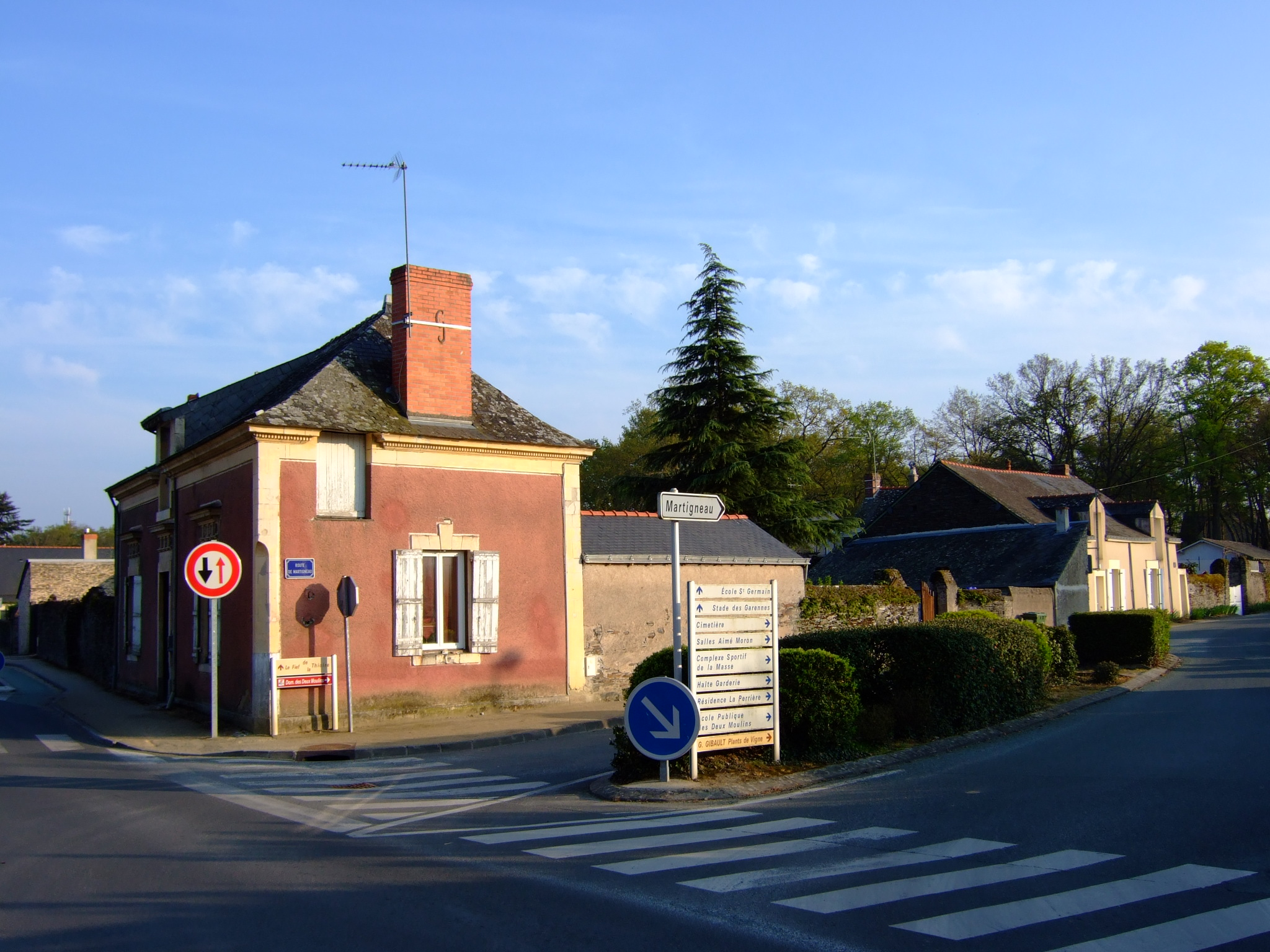
- Juigné-sur-Loire in the commune
- Location of Les Garennes sur Loire
- Location within France Location within Pays de la Loire
- Coordinates: 47°24′29″N 0°28′34″W
- Country: France
- Region: Pays de la Loire
- Department: Maine-et-Loire
- Arrondissement: Angers
- Canton: Les Ponts-de-Cé
- Area^{1}: 25.25 km^{2} (9.75 sq mi)
- Population (2023): 4,663
  - Density: 184.7/km^{2} (478.3/sq mi)
- Time zone: UTC+01:00 (CET)
  - Summer (DST): UTC+02:00 (CEST)
- INSEE/Postal code: 49167 /49610
- ^{1} French Land Register data, which excludes lakes, ponds, glaciers > 1 km^{2} (0.386 sq mi or 247 acres) and river estuaries.

Les Garennes sur Loire (French pronunciation: [le ɡaʁɛn syʁ lwaʁ], literally Les Garennes on Loire) is a commune in the Maine-et-Loire department of western France. The municipality was established on 15 December 2016 and consists of the former communes of Juigné-sur-Loire and Saint-Jean-des-Mauvrets.

== Population ==
Population data refer to the area corresponding with the commune as of January 2025.

Historical population
Year	Pop.	±% p.a.
1968	1,783	—
1975	2,372	+4.16%
1982	2,933	+3.08%
1990	3,314	+1.54%
1999	3,723	+1.30%
2007	4,194	+1.50%
2012	4,329	+0.64%
2017	4,508	+0.81%
2023	4,663	+0.57%
Source: INSEE

== See also ==
- Communes of the Maine-et-Loire department
