= Saint-Jean-des-Mauvrets =

- Part of Les Garennes sur Loire
- Location of Saint-Jean-des-Mauvrets
- Location within France Location within Pays de la Loire
- Coordinates: 47°23′57″N 0°26′52″W
- Country: France
- Region: Pays de la Loire
- Department: Maine-et-Loire
- Arrondissement: Angers
- Canton: Les Ponts-de-Cé
- Commune: Les Garennes sur Loire
- Area^{1}: 12.76 km^{2} (4.93 sq mi)
- Elevation: 32 m (105 ft)
- Highest elevation: 81 m (266 ft)
- Lowest elevation: 16 m (52 ft)
- Population (2022): 1,869
  - Density: 146.5/km^{2} (379.4/sq mi)
- Time zone: UTC+01:00 (CET)
  - Summer (DST): UTC+02:00 (CEST)
- Postal code: 49320
- ^{1} French Land Register data, which excludes lakes, ponds, glaciers > 1 km^{2} (0.386 sq mi or 247 acres) and river estuaries.

Saint-Jean-des-Mauvrets (French pronunciation: [sɛ̃ ʒɑ̃ de movʁɛ]) is a former commune in the Maine-et-Loire département in western France. On 15 December 2016, it was merged into the new commune Les Garennes sur Loire.

== See also ==
- Communes of the Maine-et-Loire department
