= Saint-Martin-de-la-Place =

- Part of Gennes-Val-de-Loire
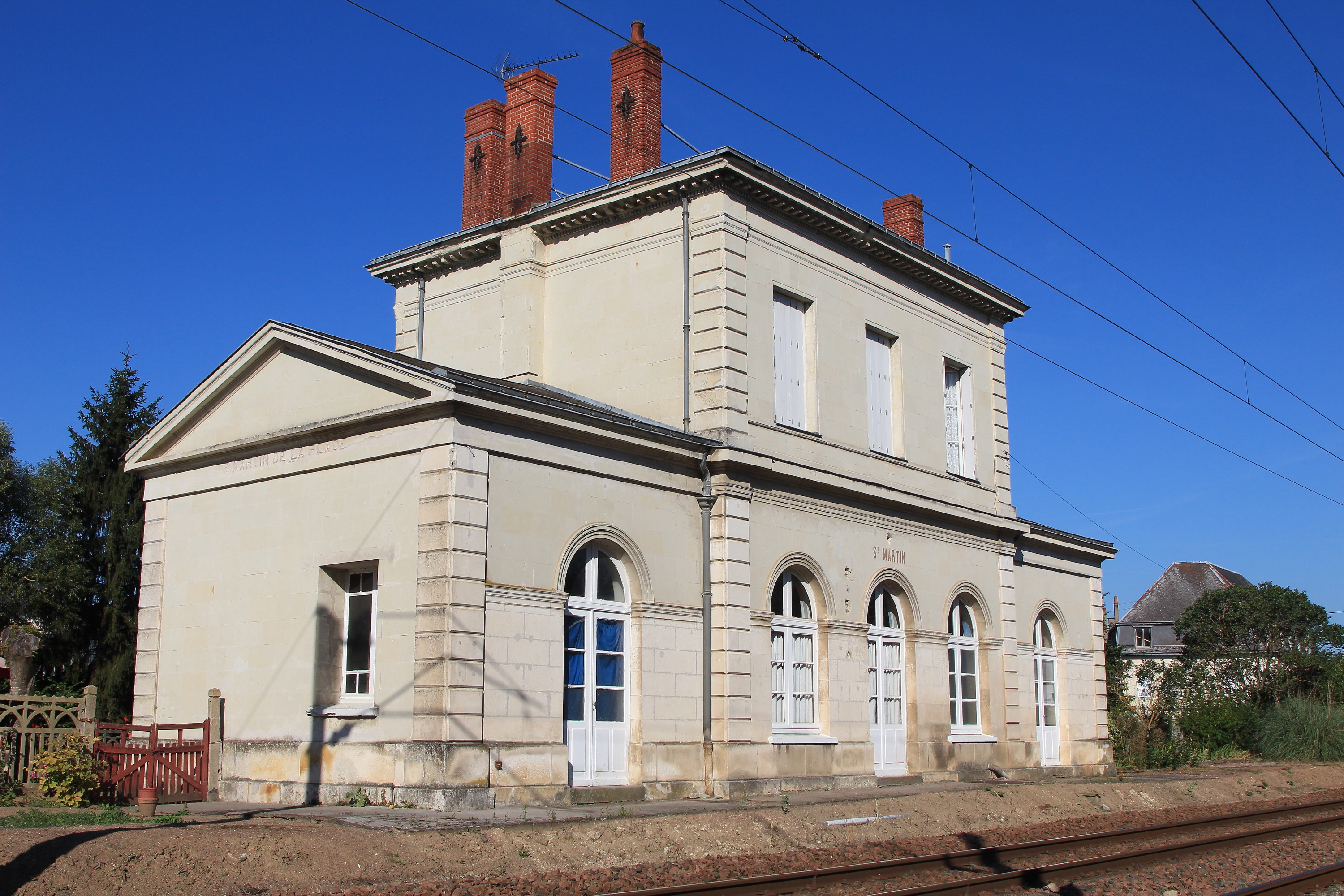
- Saint-Martin-de-la-Place railway station
- Location of Saint-Martin-de-la-Place
- Location within France Location within Pays de la Loire
- Coordinates: 47°18′58″N 0°08′53″W
- Country: France
- Region: Pays de la Loire
- Department: Maine-et-Loire
- Arrondissement: Saumur
- Canton: Longué-Jumelles
- Commune: Gennes-Val-de-Loire
- Area^{1}: 14.84 km^{2} (5.73 sq mi)
- Elevation: 25 m (82 ft)
- Highest elevation: 29 m (95 ft)
- Lowest elevation: 20 m (66 ft)
- Population (2022): 1,123
  - Density: 75.67/km^{2} (196.0/sq mi)
- Time zone: UTC+01:00 (CET)
  - Summer (DST): UTC+02:00 (CEST)
- Postal code: 49160
- ^{1} French Land Register data, which excludes lakes, ponds, glaciers > 1 km^{2} (0.386 sq mi or 247 acres) and river estuaries.

Saint-Martin-de-la-Place (French pronunciation: [sɛ̃ maʁtɛ̃ də la plas]) is a former commune in the Maine-et-Loire department in western France. On 1 January 2018, it was merged into the commune of Gennes-Val-de-Loire. Its population was 1,123 in 2022.

== See also ==
- Communes of the Maine-et-Loire department
