= Les Rosiers-sur-Loire =

- Part of Gennes-Val-de-Loire
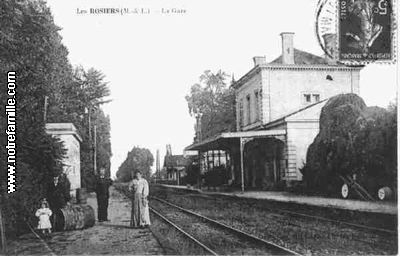
- A postcard view of the railway station in Les Rosiers
- Location of Les Rosiers-sur-Loire
- Location within France Location within Pays de la Loire
- Coordinates: 47°21′08″N 0°13′27″W
- Country: France
- Region: Pays de la Loire
- Department: Maine-et-Loire
- Arrondissement: Saumur
- Canton: Longué-Jumelles
- Commune: Gennes-Val-de-Loire
- Area^{1}: 26.11 km^{2} (10.08 sq mi)
- Elevation: 24 m (79 ft)
- Highest elevation: 26 m (85 ft)
- Lowest elevation: 18 m (59 ft)
- Population (2022): 2,325
  - Density: 89.05/km^{2} (230.6/sq mi)
- Demonym(s): Rosiérois, Rosiéroise
- Time zone: UTC+01:00 (CET)
  - Summer (DST): UTC+02:00 (CEST)
- Postal code: 49350
- ^{1} French Land Register data, which excludes lakes, ponds, glaciers > 1 km^{2} (0.386 sq mi or 247 acres) and river estuaries.

Les Rosiers-sur-Loire (French pronunciation: [le ʁozje syʁ lwaʁ]) is a former commune in the Maine-et-Loire department in the Pays de la Loire Region in western France. On 1 January 2018, it was merged into the commune of Gennes-Val-de-Loire.

The commune was called "Les Rosiers" until 1993, when it became "Les Rosiers-sur-Loire".

The village is in the heart of the Anjou, south-east of Angers and north-west of Saumur. Its territory, situated on the banks of the Loire is essentially rural.

As a Loire village, its history has sometimes been troubled, as it was during the Second World War.

== See also ==
- Communes of the Maine-et-Loire department
