= Saint-Jean-de-la-Croix =

- Commune
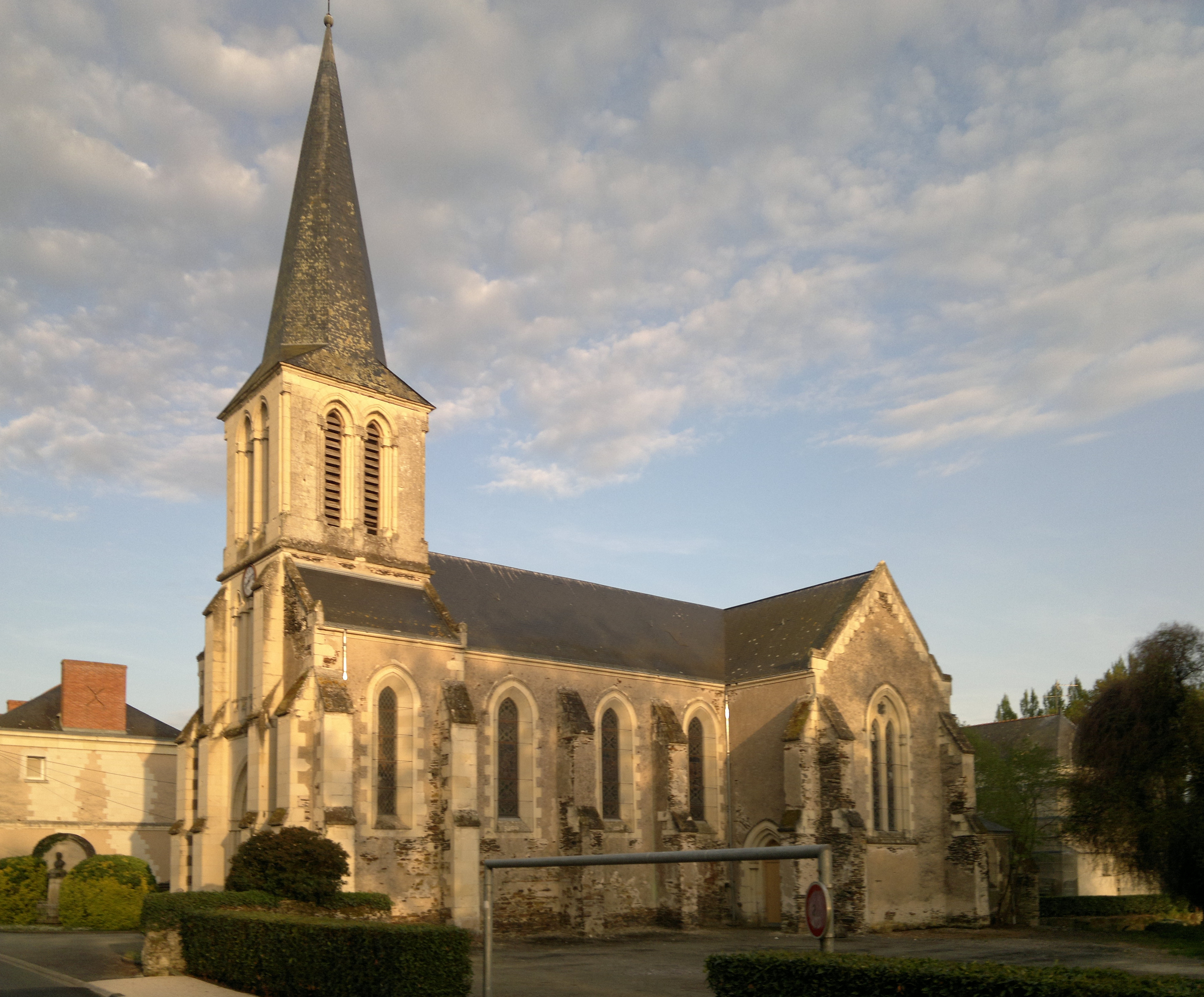
- The church of Saint-Jean
- Location of Saint-Jean-de-la-Croix
- Location within France Location within Pays de la Loire
- Coordinates: 47°24′38″N 0°35′32″W
- Country: France
- Region: Pays de la Loire
- Department: Maine-et-Loire
- Arrondissement: Angers
- Canton: Les Ponts-de-Cé
- Intercommunality: Loire Layon Aubance

Government
  - Mayor (2020–2026): Hugues Vaulerin
- Area^{1}: 1.83 km^{2} (0.71 sq mi)
- Elevation: 20 m (66 ft)
- Highest elevation: 19 m (62 ft)
- Lowest elevation: 12 m (39 ft)
- Population (2023): 232
  - Density: 127/km^{2} (328/sq mi)
- Time zone: UTC+01:00 (CET)
  - Summer (DST): UTC+02:00 (CEST)
- INSEE/Postal code: 49288 /49130
- ^{1} French Land Register data, which excludes lakes, ponds, glaciers > 1 km^{2} (0.386 sq mi or 247 acres) and river estuaries.

Saint-Jean-de-la-Croix (French pronunciation: [sɛ̃ ʒɑ̃ də la kʁwa]) is a commune in the Maine-et-Loire department in western France.

== See also ==
- Communes of the Maine-et-Loire department
