= Coutures, Maine-et-Loire =

Former commune in France

Coutures
- Part of Brissac Loire Aubance
- Location of Coutures
- Location within France Location within Pays de la Loire
- Coordinates: 47°21′47″N 0°21′15″W
- Country: France
- Region: Pays de la Loire
- Department: Maine-et-Loire
- Arrondissement: Angers
- Canton: Les Ponts-de-Cé
- Commune: Brissac Loire Aubance
- Area^{1}: 9.31 km^{2} (3.59 sq mi)
- Elevation: 48 m (157 ft)
- Highest elevation: 89 m (292 ft)
- Lowest elevation: 30 m (98 ft)
- Population (2022): 534
  - Density: 57.4/km^{2} (149/sq mi)
- Demonym(s): Couturois, Couturoise
- Time zone: UTC+01:00 (CET)
  - Summer (DST): UTC+02:00 (CEST)
- Postal code: 49320
- ^{1} French Land Register data, which excludes lakes, ponds, glaciers > 1 km^{2} (0.386 sq mi or 247 acres) and river estuaries.

Coutures (French pronunciation: [kutyʁ]) is a former commune in the Maine-et-Loire department in western France. On 15 December 2016, it was merged into the new commune Brissac Loire Aubance.

== Notable people ==
- Ernestine Chassebœuf, letter writer

== See also ==
- Communes of the Maine-et-Loire department
