= Saint-Melaine-sur-Aubance =

- Commune
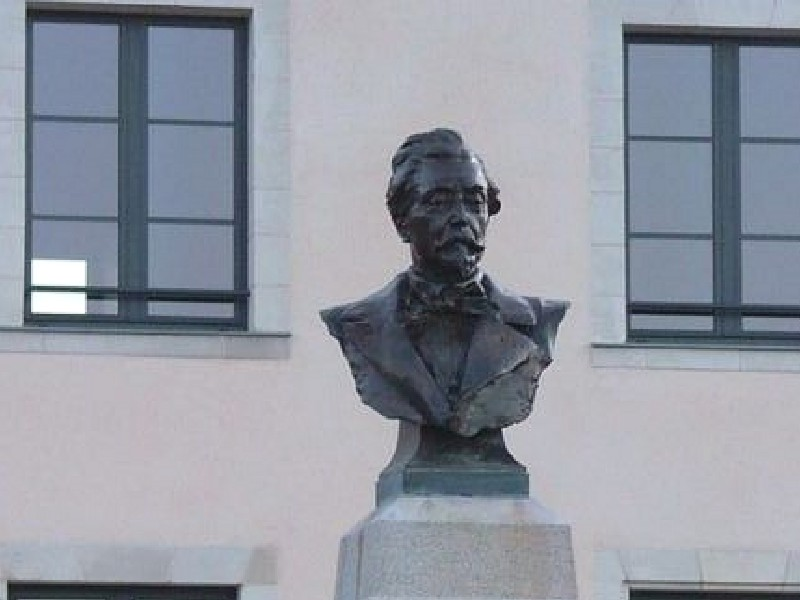
- A bust of Armand Brousse outside the town hall
- Location of Saint-Melaine-sur-Aubance
- Location within France Location within Pays de la Loire
- Coordinates: 47°22′14″N 0°29′31″W
- Country: France
- Region: Pays de la Loire
- Department: Maine-et-Loire
- Arrondissement: Angers
- Canton: Les Ponts-de-Cé
- Intercommunality: Loire Layon Aubance

Government
  - Mayor (2020–2026): Dominique Forest
- Area^{1}: 5.11 km^{2} (1.97 sq mi)
- Elevation: 39 m (128 ft)
- Highest elevation: 63 m (207 ft)
- Lowest elevation: 17 m (56 ft)
- Population (2023): 2,216
  - Density: 434/km^{2} (1,120/sq mi)
- Time zone: UTC+01:00 (CET)
  - Summer (DST): UTC+02:00 (CEST)
- INSEE/Postal code: 49308 /49610
- ^{1} French Land Register data, which excludes lakes, ponds, glaciers > 1 km^{2} (0.386 sq mi or 247 acres) and river estuaries.

Saint-Melaine-sur-Aubance (French pronunciation: [sɛ̃ məlɛn syʁ obɑ̃s]) is a commune in the Maine-et-Loire department in western France.

== Population ==
Historical population
Year	Pop.	±% p.a.
1968	434	—
1975	628	+5.42%
1982	989	+6.70%
1990	1,579	+6.02%
1999	1,942	+2.33%
2007	2,112	+1.05%
2012	2,060	−0.50%
2017	2,063	+0.03%
2023	2,216	+1.20%
Source: INSEE

== See also ==
- Communes of the Maine-et-Loire department
