= Charles-René Reynaud =

French mathematician

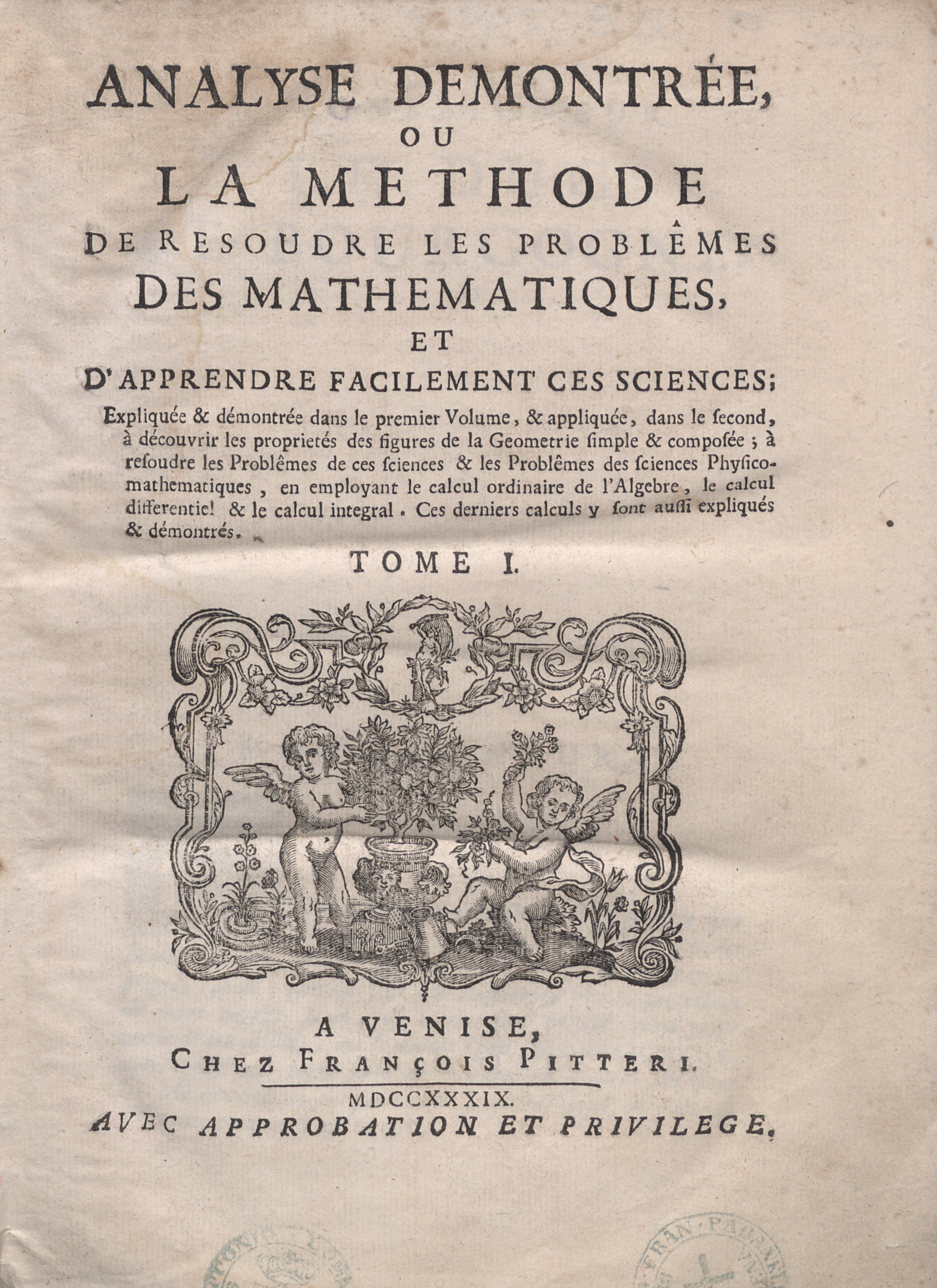
Analyse demontrée, 1739

Charles-René Reynaud (or Reyneau), (1656, Brissac, Province of Anjou – 24 February 1728, Paris) was a French mathematician.

== Biography ==
A priest of the Oratory of Saint Philip Neri, father Reyneau was successively professor of philosophy at Toulon and Pézenas, and then of mathematics at the college of Angers. He was a member of the Académie des sciences, belles-lettres et arts d'Angers and free associate of the French Academy of Sciences.

His Analyse démontrée is a collection of the main theories prevalent in works of (?) etc.; Reyneau added demonstrations or offered better ones.

== Publications ==
- Analyse démontrée, ou la Méthode de résoudre les problèmes de mathématiques, Paris, 1708, 2 t., in one vol. in-4°
  - Several editions online at HathiTrust Digital Library, including la deuxième, Paris, Quillau, 1736-1738
- Science du calcul des grandeurs en général, ou Éléments de mathématiques, Paris, J. Quillau, 1714–35, 2 vol. in-4°, with figures
  - Edition online at HathiTrust

== Sources ==
- Joseph-Marie Quérard, La France littéraire, vol.7, Paris, Firmin Didot, 1835, p. 567–8.
