= Blaison-Saint-Sulpice =

- Commune
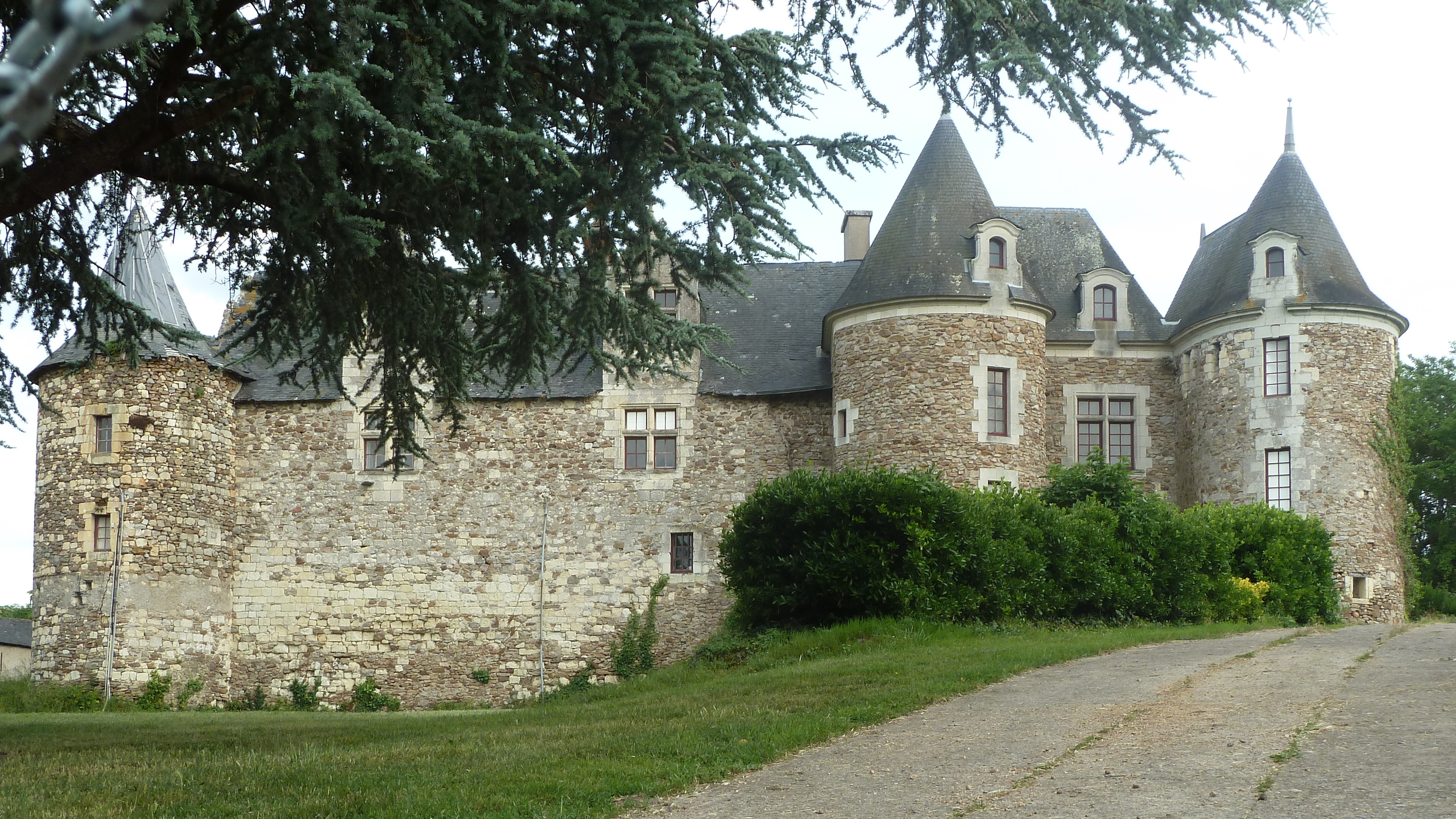
- The Château of Blaison
- Location of Blaison-Saint-Sulpice
- Location within France Location within Pays de la Loire
- Coordinates: 47°24′00″N 0°22′16″W
- Country: France
- Region: Pays de la Loire
- Department: Maine-et-Loire
- Arrondissement: Angers
- Canton: Les Ponts-de-Cé

Government
  - Mayor (2023–2026): Carole Jouin-Legagneux
- Area^{1}: 24.35 km^{2} (9.40 sq mi)
- Population (2023): 1,337
  - Density: 54.91/km^{2} (142.2/sq mi)
- Time zone: UTC+01:00 (CET)
  - Summer (DST): UTC+02:00 (CEST)
- INSEE/Postal code: 49029 /49320
- ^{1} French Land Register data, which excludes lakes, ponds, glaciers > 1 km^{2} (0.386 sq mi or 247 acres) and river estuaries.

Blaison-Saint-Sulpice (French pronunciation: [blɛzɔ̃ sɛ̃ sylpis]) is a commune in the Maine-et-Loire department of western France. The municipality was established on 1 January 2016 and consists of the former communes of Blaison-Gohier and Saint-Sulpice.

== See also ==
- Communes of the Maine-et-Loire department
