= Brissac Loire Aubance =

- Commune
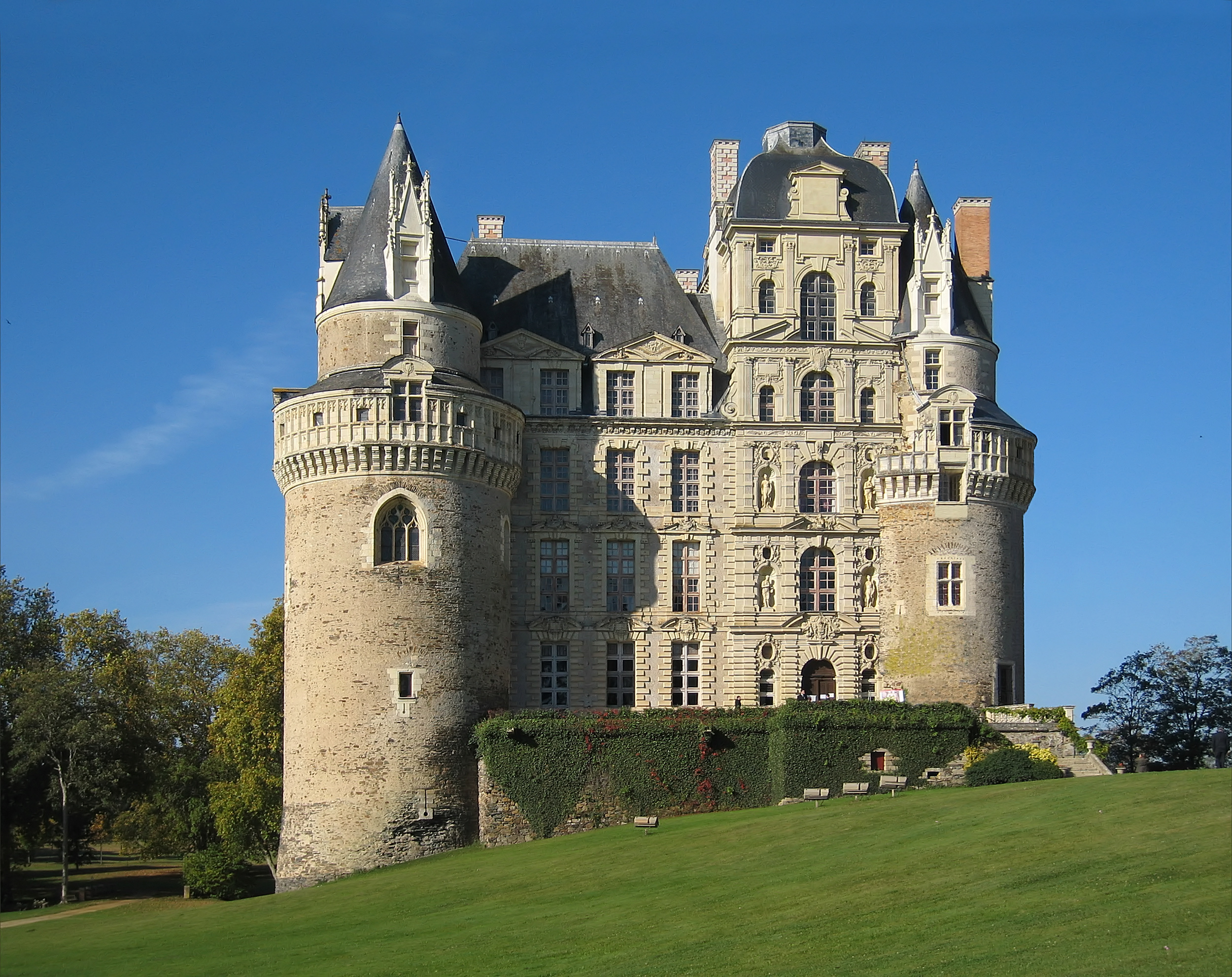
- Château de Brissac is located in the commune
- Location of Brissac Loire Aubance
- Location within France Location within Pays de la Loire
- Coordinates: 47°21′22″N 0°26′53″W
- Country: France
- Region: Pays de la Loire
- Department: Maine-et-Loire
- Arrondissement: Angers
- Canton: Les Ponts-de-Cé and Doué-en-Anjou
- Intercommunality: Loire Layon Aubance

Government
  - Mayor (2020–2026): Sylvie Sourisseau
- Area^{1}: 120.89 km^{2} (46.68 sq mi)
- Population (2023): 10,878
  - Density: 89.983/km^{2} (233.05/sq mi)
- Time zone: UTC+01:00 (CET)
  - Summer (DST): UTC+02:00 (CEST)
- INSEE/Postal code: 49050 /49320, 49250
- ^{1} French Land Register data, which excludes lakes, ponds, glaciers > 1 km^{2} (0.386 sq mi or 247 acres) and river estuaries.

Brissac Loire Aubance (French pronunciation: [bʁisak lwaʁ obɑ̃s]) is a commune in the Maine-et-Loire department of western France. The municipality was established on 15 December 2016 and consists of the former communes of Les Alleuds, Brissac-Quincé, Charcé-Saint-Ellier-sur-Aubance, Chemellier, Coutures, Luigné, Saint-Rémy-la-Varenne, Saint-Saturnin-sur-Loire, Saulgé-l'Hôpital and Vauchrétien.

== Population ==
Historical population
Year	Pop.	±% p.a.
1968	5,619	—
1975	5,578	−0.10%
1982	6,630	+2.50%
1990	7,919	+2.25%
1999	8,483	+0.77%
2007	9,913	+1.97%
2012	10,581	+1.31%
2017	10,807	+0.42%
2023	10,878	+0.11%
Populations of the area corresponding with the commune of Brissac Loire Aubance at 1 January 2025. Source: INSEE

== See also ==
- Communes of the Maine-et-Loire department
