= Brissac-Quincé =

- Part of Brissac Loire Aubance
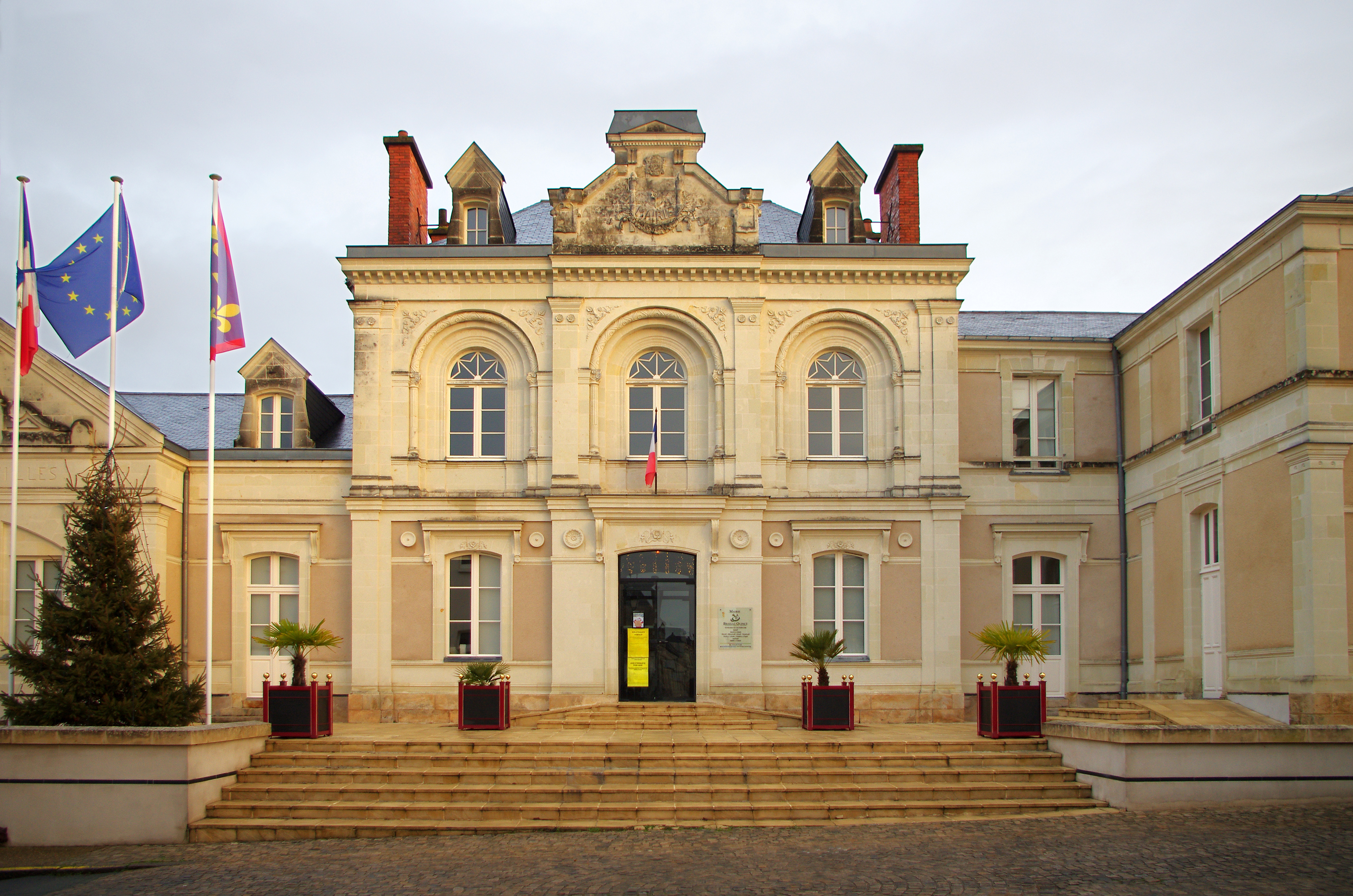
- Mairie in Brissac-Quincé

- Coat of arms
- Location of Brissac-Quincé
- Location within France Location within Pays de la Loire
- Coordinates: 47°21′21″N 0°26′49″W
- Country: France
- Region: Pays de la Loire
- Department: Maine-et-Loire
- Arrondissement: Angers
- Canton: Les Ponts-de-Cé
- Commune: Brissac Loire Aubance
- Area^{1}: 9.76 km^{2} (3.77 sq mi)
- Elevation: 59 m (194 ft)
- Highest elevation: 78 m (256 ft)
- Lowest elevation: 33 m (108 ft)
- Population (2022): 3,175
  - Density: 325/km^{2} (843/sq mi)
- Time zone: UTC+01:00 (CET)
  - Summer (DST): UTC+02:00 (CEST)
- Postal code: 49320
- ^{1} French Land Register data, which excludes lakes, ponds, glaciers > 1 km^{2} (0.386 sq mi or 247 acres) and river estuaries.

Brissac-Quincé (French pronunciation: [bʁisak kɛ̃se]) is a former commune of the Maine-et-Loire département, in France. It was created in 1964 from a regrouping of two former neighbouring communes, Brissac and Quincé. On 15 December 2016, Brissac-Quincé was merged into the new commune of Brissac Loire Aubance.

The French mathematician Charles-René Reynaud (1656–1728) was born in Brissac. The Château de Brissac is located in the commune.

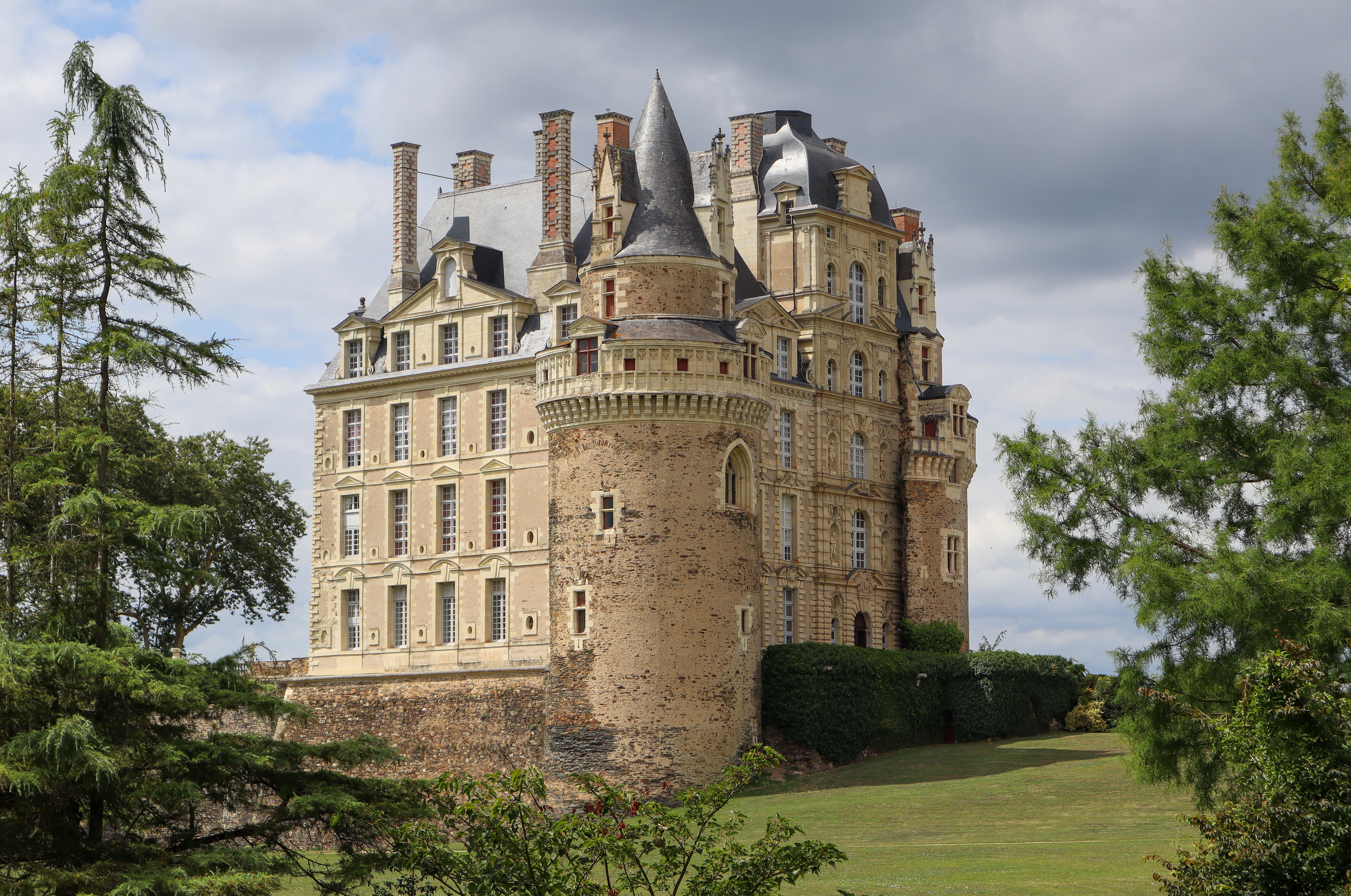
Brissac Castle

== Population ==
Historical population
Year	Pop.	±% p.a.
1968	1,671	—
1975	1,668	−0.03%
1982	1,942	+2.20%
1990	2,275	+2.00%
1999	2,296	+0.10%
2007	2,588	+1.51%
2012	2,970	+2.79%
2022	3,175	+0.67%
Source: EHESS and INSEE

== Twin towns ==
- Caluso, Italy

== See also ==
- Communes of the Maine-et-Loire department
