= Gennes-Val-de-Loire =

- Commune
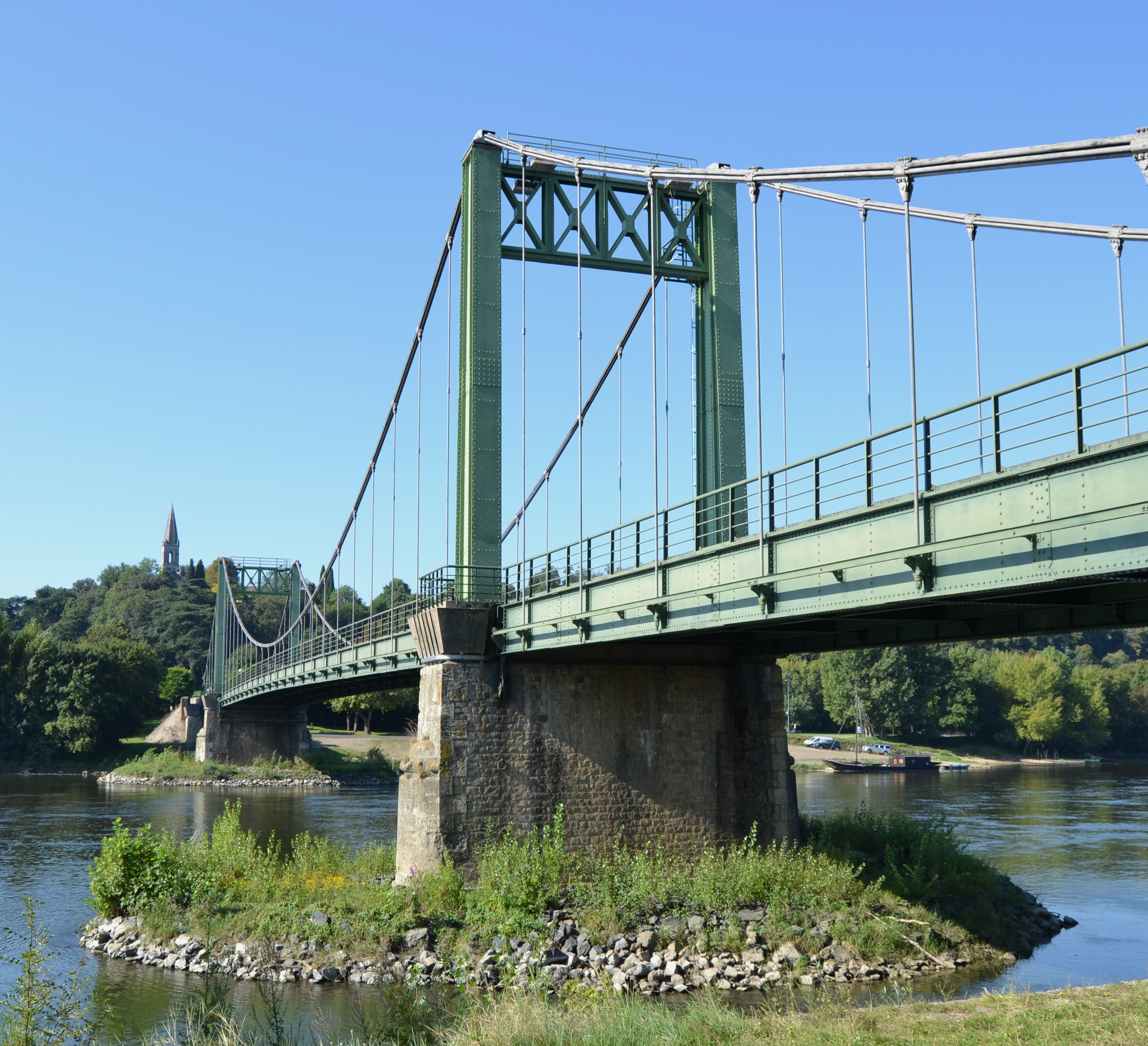
- The bridge of Gennes
- Location of Gennes-Val-de-Loire
- Location within France Location within Pays de la Loire
- Coordinates: 47°21′08″N 0°13′27″W
- Country: France
- Region: Pays de la Loire
- Department: Maine-et-Loire
- Arrondissement: Saumur
- Canton: Doué-en-Anjou, Longué-Jumelles
- Intercommunality: CA Saumur Val de Loire

Government
  - Mayor (2021–2026): Nicole Moisy
- Area^{1}: 144.94 km^{2} (55.96 sq mi)
- Population (2023): 8,429
  - Density: 58.16/km^{2} (150.6/sq mi)
- Time zone: UTC+01:00 (CET)
  - Summer (DST): UTC+02:00 (CEST)
- INSEE/Postal code: 49261 /49160, 49320, 49350
- ^{1} French Land Register data, which excludes lakes, ponds, glaciers > 1 km^{2} (0.386 sq mi or 247 acres) and river estuaries.

Gennes-Val-de-Loire (French pronunciation: [ʒɛn val də lwaʁ], literally Gennes-Valley of Loire) is a commune in the Maine-et-Loire department of western France. The municipality was established on 1 January 2016 by merger the former communes of Gennes, Chênehutte-Trèves-Cunault, Grézillé, Saint-Georges-des-Sept-Voies and Le Thoureil. On 1 January 2018, the former communes of Les Rosiers-sur-Loire and Saint-Martin-de-la-Place were merged into it.

== Population ==
The population data given in the table below refer to the commune of Gennes-Val-de-Loire in its geography as of January 2025.

Historical population
Year	Pop.	±% p.a.
1968	6,790	—
1975	6,782	−0.02%
1982	7,173	+0.80%
1990	7,648	+0.80%
1999	7,731	+0.12%
2007	8,029	+0.47%
2012	8,488	+1.12%
2017	8,724	+0.55%
2023	8,429	−0.57%
Source: INSEE

== See also ==
- Communes of the Maine-et-Loire department
