= Mûrs-Erigné =

- Commune
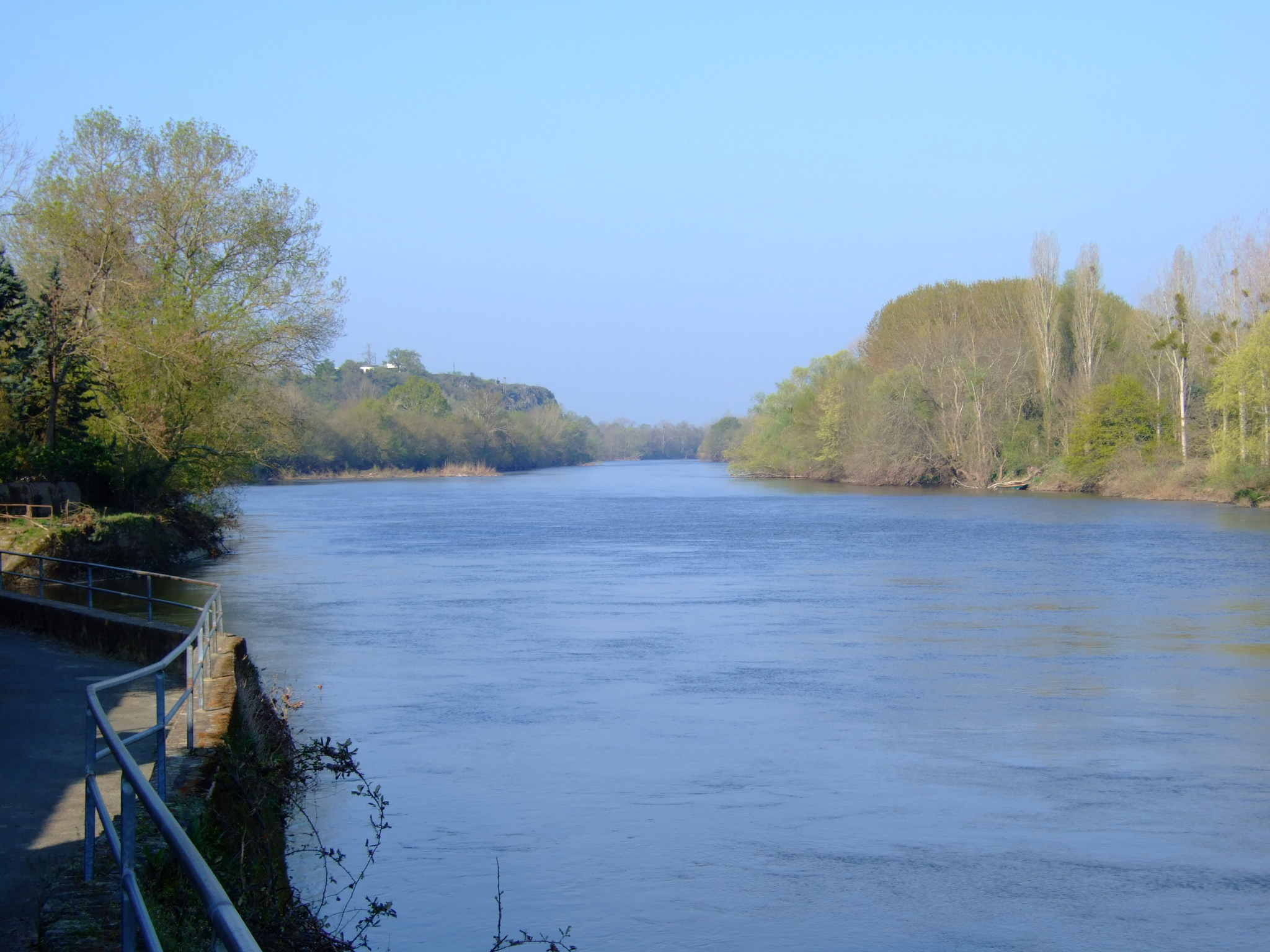
- The Louet river at Mûrs-Erigné

- Coat of arms
- Location of Mûrs-Erigné
- Location within France Location within Pays de la Loire
- Coordinates: 47°23′46″N 0°33′07″W
- Country: France
- Region: Pays de la Loire
- Department: Maine-et-Loire
- Arrondissement: Angers
- Canton: Les Ponts-de-Cé
- Intercommunality: CU Angers Loire Métropole

Government
  - Mayor (2022–2026): Jérôme Foyer
- Area^{1}: 17.29 km^{2} (6.68 sq mi)
- Highest elevation: 80 m (260 ft)
- Lowest elevation: 12 m (39 ft)
- Population (2023): 6,408
  - Density: 370.6/km^{2} (959.9/sq mi)
- Demonym(s): Éri-mûrois, Éri-mûroises
- Time zone: UTC+01:00 (CET)
  - Summer (DST): UTC+02:00 (CEST)
- INSEE/Postal code: 49223 /49610
- ^{1} French Land Register data, which excludes lakes, ponds, glaciers > 1 km^{2} (0.386 sq mi or 247 acres) and river estuaries.

Mûrs-Erigné (French pronunciation: [myʁ eʁiɲe]) is a commune in the Maine-et-Loire department in western France.

== Population ==
Historical population
Year	Pop.	±% p.a.
1968	2,186	—
1975	2,621	+2.63%
1982	3,275	+3.23%
1990	4,224	+3.23%
1999	5,115	+2.15%
2007	5,305	+0.46%
2012	5,370	+0.24%
2017	5,522	+0.56%
2023	6,408	+2.51%
Source: INSEE

== See also ==
- Communes of the Maine-et-Loire department
