= Saint-Rémy-la-Varenne =

Saint-Remy-la-Varenne
- Part of Brissac Loire Aubance
- Location of Saint-Remy-la-Varenne
- Location within France Location within Pays de la Loire
- Coordinates: 47°23′53″N 0°18′52″W
- Country: France
- Region: Pays de la Loire
- Department: Maine-et-Loire
- Arrondissement: Angers
- Canton: Les Ponts-de-Cé
- Commune: Brissac Loire Aubance
- Area^{1}: 15.67 km^{2} (6.05 sq mi)
- Elevation: 30 m (98 ft)
- Highest elevation: 77 m (253 ft)
- Lowest elevation: 18 m (59 ft)
- Population (2022): 945
  - Density: 60.3/km^{2} (156/sq mi)
- Time zone: UTC+01:00 (CET)
  - Summer (DST): UTC+02:00 (CEST)
- Postal code: 49250
- ^{1} French Land Register data, which excludes lakes, ponds, glaciers > 1 km^{2} (0.386 sq mi or 247 acres) and river estuaries.

Saint-Rémy-la-Varenne (French pronunciation: [sɛ̃ ʁemi la vaʁɛn]) is a former commune in the Maine-et-Loire department in western France. On 15 December 2016, it was merged into the new commune Brissac Loire Aubance. Its population was 945 in 2022.

== See also ==
- Communes of the Maine-et-Loire department
