= Grézillé =

- Part of Gennes-Val-de-Loire
- Location of Grézillé
- Location within France Location within Pays de la Loire
- Coordinates: 47°19′37″N 0°20′44″W
- Country: France
- Region: Pays de la Loire
- Department: Maine-et-Loire
- Arrondissement: Saumur
- Canton: Doué-la-Fontaine
- Commune: Gennes-Val-de-Loire
- Area^{1}: 17.62 km^{2} (6.80 sq mi)
- Elevation: 50 m (160 ft)
- Highest elevation: 100 m (330 ft)
- Lowest elevation: 44 m (144 ft)
- Population (2022): 611
  - Density: 34.7/km^{2} (89.8/sq mi)
- Demonym(s): Grézillois, Grézilloise
- Time zone: UTC+01:00 (CET)
  - Summer (DST): UTC+02:00 (CEST)
- Postal code: 49320
- ^{1} French Land Register data, which excludes lakes, ponds, glaciers > 1 km^{2} (0.386 sq mi or 247 acres) and river estuaries.

Grézillé (French pronunciation: [ɡʁezije]) is a former commune in the Maine-et-Loire department in western France. On 1 January 2016, it was merged into the new commune of Gennes-Val-de-Loire.

== See also ==
- Communes of the Maine-et-Loire department
