= Soulaines-sur-Aubance =

- Commune
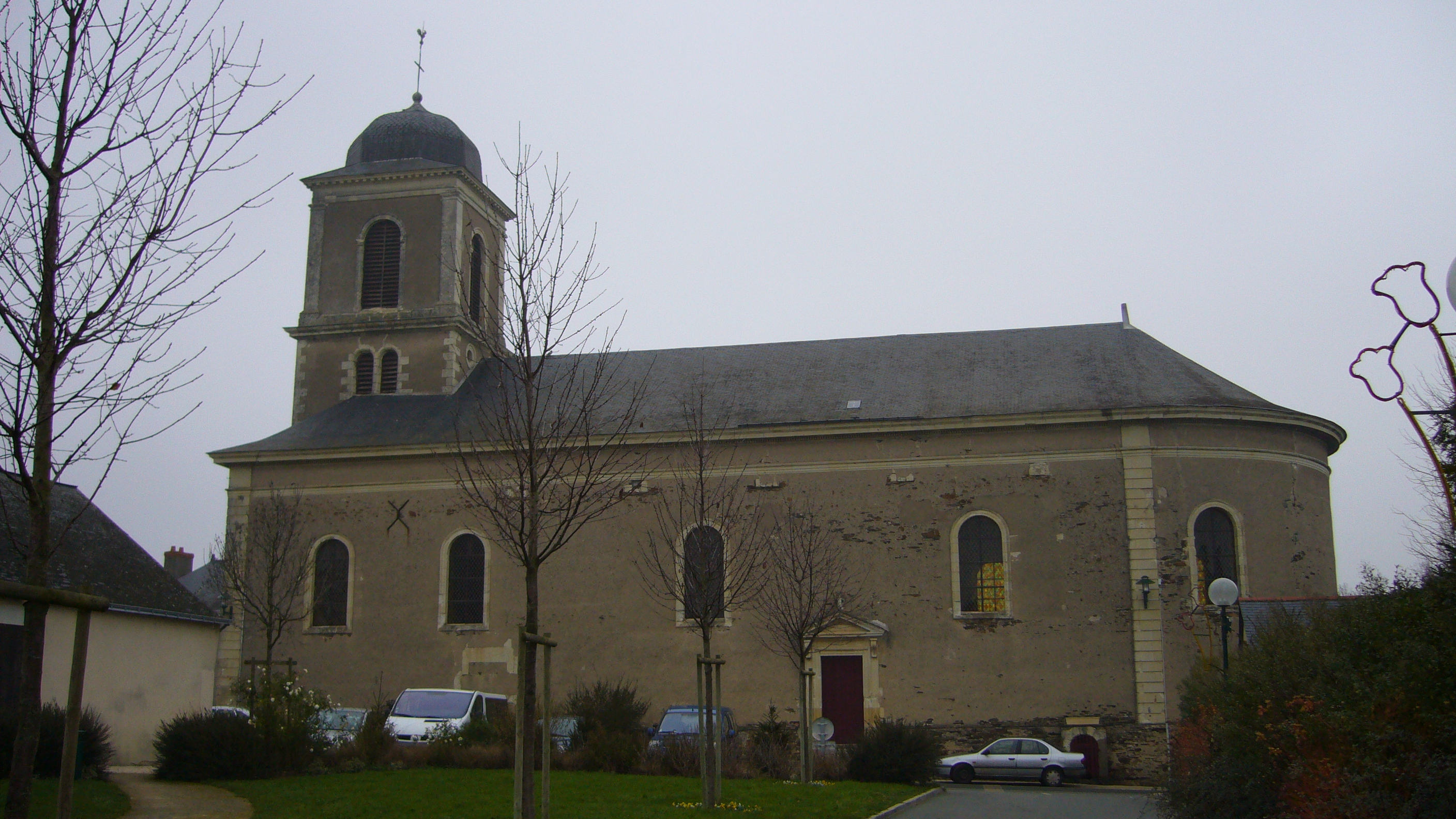
- The church of Soulaines-sur-Aubance
- Location of Soulaines-sur-Aubance
- Location within France Location within Pays de la Loire
- Coordinates: 47°21′56″N 0°31′16″W
- Country: France
- Region: Pays de la Loire
- Department: Maine-et-Loire
- Arrondissement: Angers
- Canton: Les Ponts-de-Cé
- Intercommunality: CU Angers Loire Métropole

Government
  - Mayor (2020–2026): Robert Biagi
- Area^{1}: 12.72 km^{2} (4.91 sq mi)
- Highest elevation: 96 m (315 ft)
- Lowest elevation: 17 m (56 ft)
- Population (2023): 1,329
  - Density: 104.5/km^{2} (270.6/sq mi)
- Demonym(s): Soulainois, Soulainoise
- Time zone: UTC+01:00 (CET)
  - Summer (DST): UTC+02:00 (CEST)
- INSEE/Postal code: 49338 /49610
- ^{1} French Land Register data, which excludes lakes, ponds, glaciers > 1 km^{2} (0.386 sq mi or 247 acres) and river estuaries.

Soulaines-sur-Aubance (French pronunciation: [sulɛn syʁ obɑ̃s]) is a commune in the Maine-et-Loire department of western France.

== See also ==
- Communes of the Maine-et-Loire department
