= Les Ponts-de-Cé =

- Commune
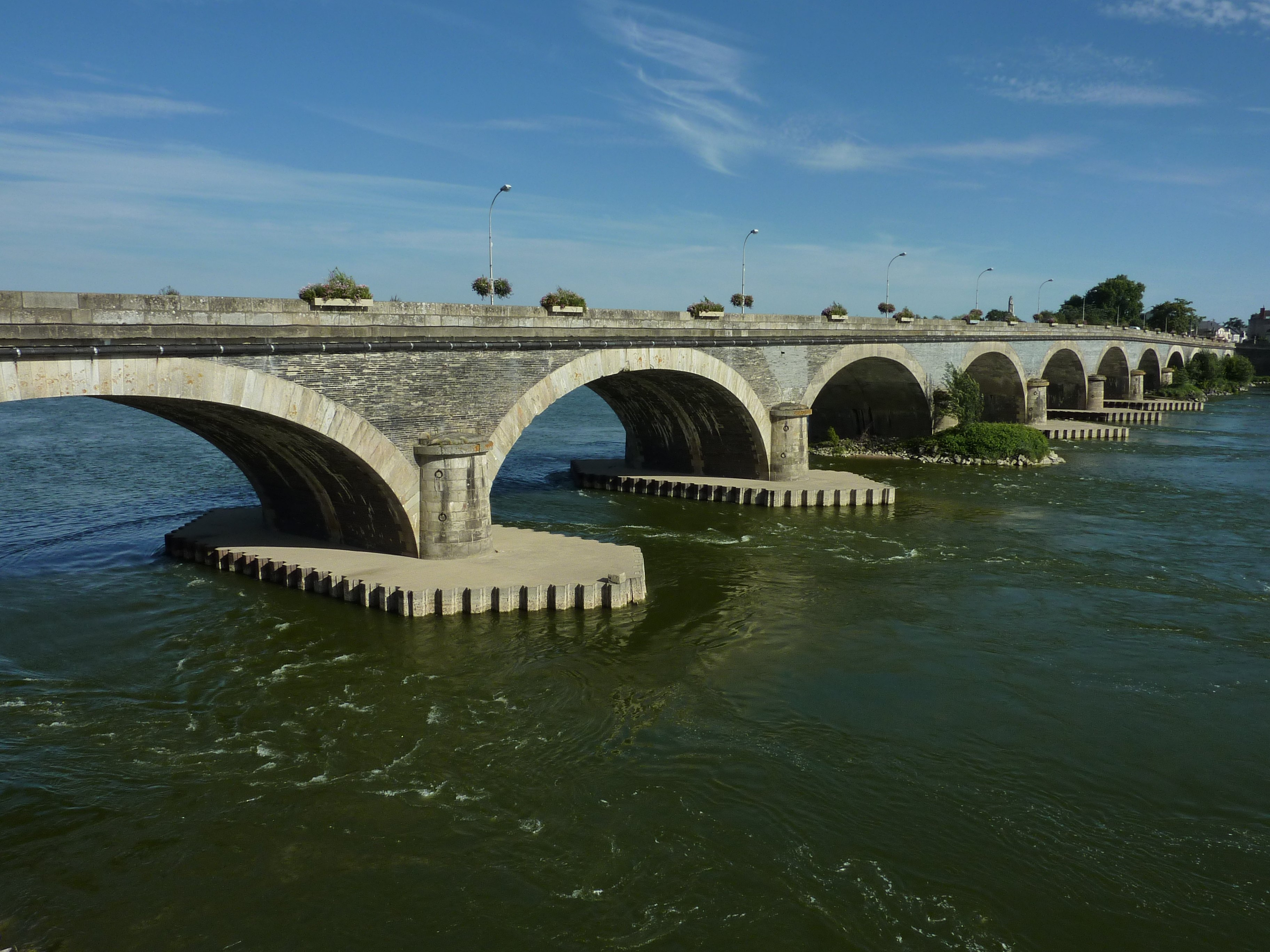
- The Dumnacus Bridge in Les Ponts-de-Cé

- Coat of arms
- Location of Les Ponts-de-Cé
- Location within France Location within Pays de la Loire
- Coordinates: 47°25′31″N 0°31′27″W
- Country: France
- Region: Pays de la Loire
- Department: Maine-et-Loire
- Arrondissement: Angers
- Canton: Les Ponts-de-Cé
- Intercommunality: CU Angers Loire Métropole

Government
  - Mayor (2020–2026): Jean-Paul Pavillon
- Area^{1}: 19.55 km^{2} (7.55 sq mi)
- Elevation: 26 m (85 ft)
- Highest elevation: 36 m (118 ft)
- Lowest elevation: 15 m (49 ft)
- Population (2023): 13,149
  - Density: 672.6/km^{2} (1,742/sq mi)
- Time zone: UTC+01:00 (CET)
  - Summer (DST): UTC+02:00 (CEST)
- INSEE/Postal code: 49246 /49130
- ^{1} French Land Register data, which excludes lakes, ponds, glaciers > 1 km^{2} (0.386 sq mi or 247 acres) and river estuaries.

Les Ponts-de-Cé (French pronunciation: [le pɔ̃ də se]) is a commune in the Maine-et-Loire department in western France.

Les Ponts-de-Cé is a suburb of Angers.

== History ==
In September 1432, during the Hundred Years' War, the routiers of Rodrigo de Villandrando, in the pay of Georges de la Trémoille, held Les Ponts-de-Cé against the assaults of Jean de Bueil.

On 7 August 1620, the Battle of Ponts-de-Cé definitively ended a civil war, waged by Marie de Médicis. Her troops were defeated by her son, the French King Louis XIII. This short rebellion, subdued easily by the King's troops, is known in France under the name of "Drôlerie des Ponts-de-Cé" (Les Ponts-de-Cé's joke).

The anarchists in the city were targeted during the repression of January and February 1894.

== Names ==
In the past, Les Ponts-de-Cé had known many different names, which are :

- Castro-Seio (889)
- Pon Sigei (1009)
- In Saiaco (1036)
- Saiacus (1090)
- Seium (1104)
- Pons Sagei (1115)
- Pons Sagii (1148)
- Pons Saeii (1291)
- Le Pont de Sae (1293)
- Les Ponts de See (1529)

Indeed, the city has the characteristic of being spanned by many bridges which connect the various zones and roads of the city between them. This is also why the French meaning could be translated by "Cé's bridges".

== Population ==
Historical population
| Year | Pop. | ±% p.a. |
|---|---|---|
| 1968 | 7,175 | — |
| 1975 | 9,589 | +4.23% |
| 1982 | 10,739 | +1.63% |
| 1990 | 11,032 | +0.34% |
| 1999 | 11,387 | +0.35% |
| 2007 | 11,500 | +0.12% |
| 2012 | 11,975 | +0.81% |
| 2017 | 12,679 | +1.15% |
| 2023 | 13,149 | +0.61% |
Source: INSEE

== See also ==
- Communes of the Maine-et-Loire department
