= Le Thoureil =

- Part of Gennes-Val-de-Loire
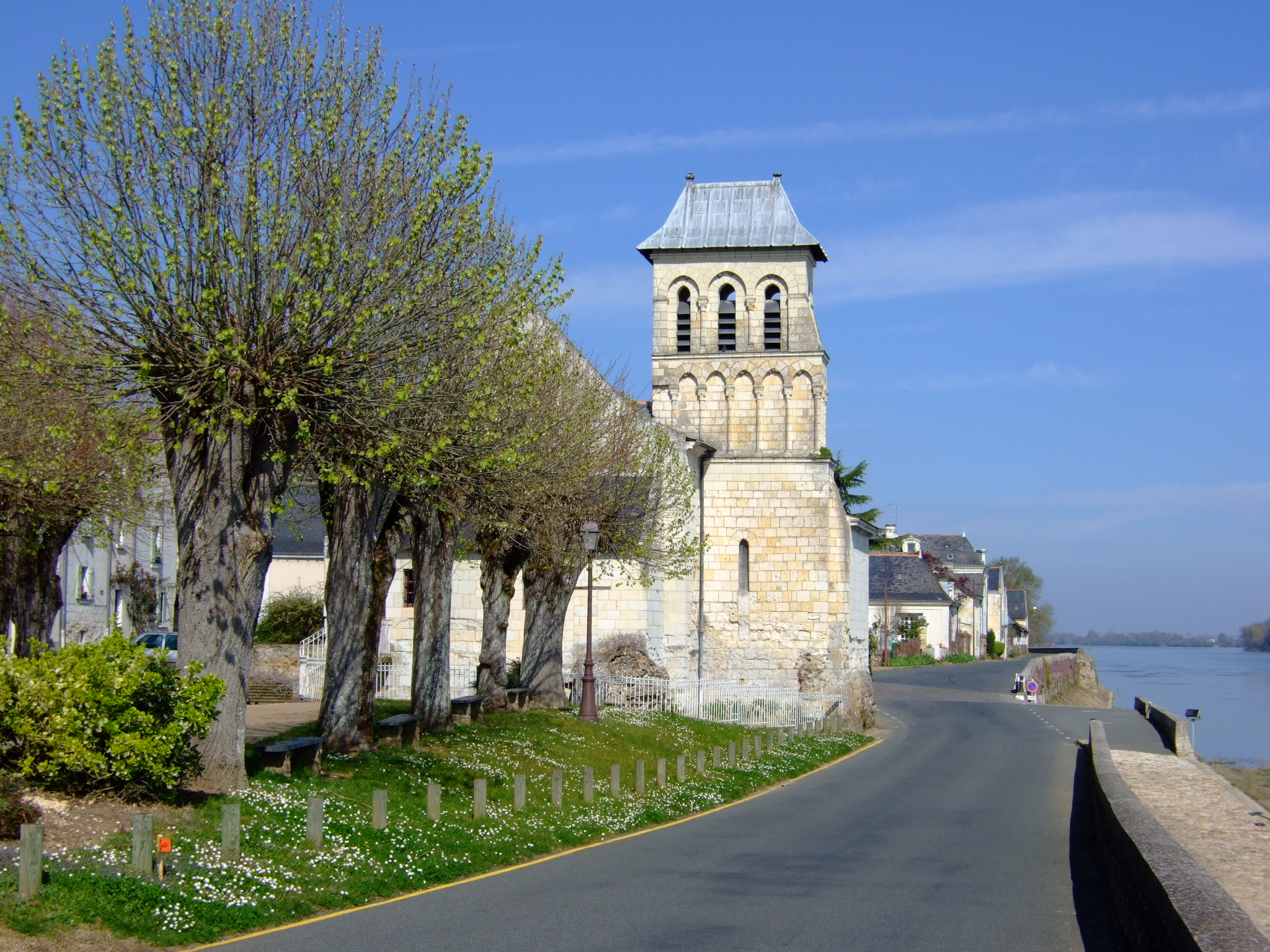
- Les bords de Loire dans le village du Thoureil

- Coat of arms
- Location of Le Thoureil
- Location within France Location within Pays de la Loire
- Coordinates: 47°22′19″N 0°15′55″W
- Country: France
- Region: Pays de la Loire
- Department: Maine-et-Loire
- Arrondissement: Saumur
- Canton: Doué-la-Fontaine
- Commune: Gennes-Val-de-Loire
- Area^{1}: 11.02 km^{2} (4.25 sq mi)
- Elevation: 35 m (115 ft)
- Highest elevation: 84 m (276 ft)
- Lowest elevation: 17 m (56 ft)
- Population (2022): 409
  - Density: 37.1/km^{2} (96.1/sq mi)
- Time zone: UTC+01:00 (CET)
  - Summer (DST): UTC+02:00 (CEST)
- Postal code: 49350
- ^{1} French Land Register data, which excludes lakes, ponds, glaciers > 1 km^{2} (0.386 sq mi or 247 acres) and river estuaries.

Le Thoureil (French pronunciation: [lə tuʁɛj]) is a village and former commune in the Maine-et-Loire department in western France. On 1 January 2016, the commune was merged into the new commune of Gennes-Val-de-Loire, but retains its own delegated mayor. Other than the village of Thoureil itself, it contains, Bessé, Saint-Maur-sur-Loire and Bourgneuf. The toponymy of Thoureil is spuriously postulated by some tradition to be from Latin turriculum ("a small tower").

== See also ==
- Communes of the Maine-et-Loire department
