= Saint-Georges-des-Sept-Voies =

- Part of Gennes-Val-de-Loire
- Location of Saint-Georges-des-Sept-Voies
- Location within France Location within Pays de la Loire
- Coordinates: 47°21′32″N 0°17′59″W
- Country: France
- Region: Pays de la Loire
- Department: Maine-et-Loire
- Arrondissement: Saumur
- Canton: Doué-la-Fontaine
- Commune: Gennes-Val-de-Loire
- Area^{1}: 15.22 km^{2} (5.88 sq mi)
- Elevation: 62 m (203 ft)
- Highest elevation: 93 m (305 ft)
- Lowest elevation: 31 m (102 ft)
- Population (2022): 656
  - Density: 43.1/km^{2} (112/sq mi)
- Time zone: UTC+01:00 (CET)
  - Summer (DST): UTC+02:00 (CEST)
- Postal code: 49350
- ^{1} French Land Register data, which excludes lakes, ponds, glaciers > 1 km^{2} (0.386 sq mi or 247 acres) and river estuaries.

Saint-Georges-des-Sept-Voies (French pronunciation: [sɛ̃ ʒɔʁʒ de sɛt vwa]) is a former commune in the Maine-et-Loire department in western France. On 1 January 2016, it was merged into the new commune of Gennes-Val-de-Loire. Its population was 656 in 2022.

== See also ==
- Communes of the Maine-et-Loire department
