= Canton of Les Ponts-de-Cé =

French canron

Coordinates: 47.43°N 0.53°W

The canton of Les Ponts-de-Cé is an administrative division of the Maine-et-Loire department, in western France. Its borders were modified at the French canton reorganisation which came into effect in March 2015. Its seat is in Les Ponts-de-Cé.

It consists of the following communes:

1. Blaison-Saint-Sulpice
2. Brissac Loire Aubance (partly)
3. Les Garennes sur Loire
4. Mûrs-Erigné
5. Les Ponts-de-Cé
6. Saint-Jean-de-la-Croix
7. Saint-Melaine-sur-Aubance
8. Soulaines-sur-Aubance
