= Beaupréau =

Commune in Maine-et-Loire, France

- Part of Beaupréau-en-Mauges
- Location of Beaupréau
- Location within France Location within Pays de la Loire
- Coordinates: 47°12′10″N 0°59′36″W
- Country: France
- Region: Pays de la Loire
- Department: Maine-et-Loire
- Arrondissement: Cholet
- Canton: Beaupréau
- Commune: Beaupréau-en-Mauges
- Area^{1}: 35.83 km^{2} (13.83 sq mi)
- Highest elevation: 117 m (384 ft)
- Lowest elevation: 32 m (105 ft)
- Population (2022): 7,794
  - Density: 217.5/km^{2} (563.4/sq mi)
- Time zone: UTC+01:00 (CET)
  - Summer (DST): UTC+02:00 (CEST)
- Postal code: 49600
- ^{1} French Land Register data, which excludes lakes, ponds, glaciers > 1 km^{2} (0.386 sq mi or 247 acres) and river estuaries.

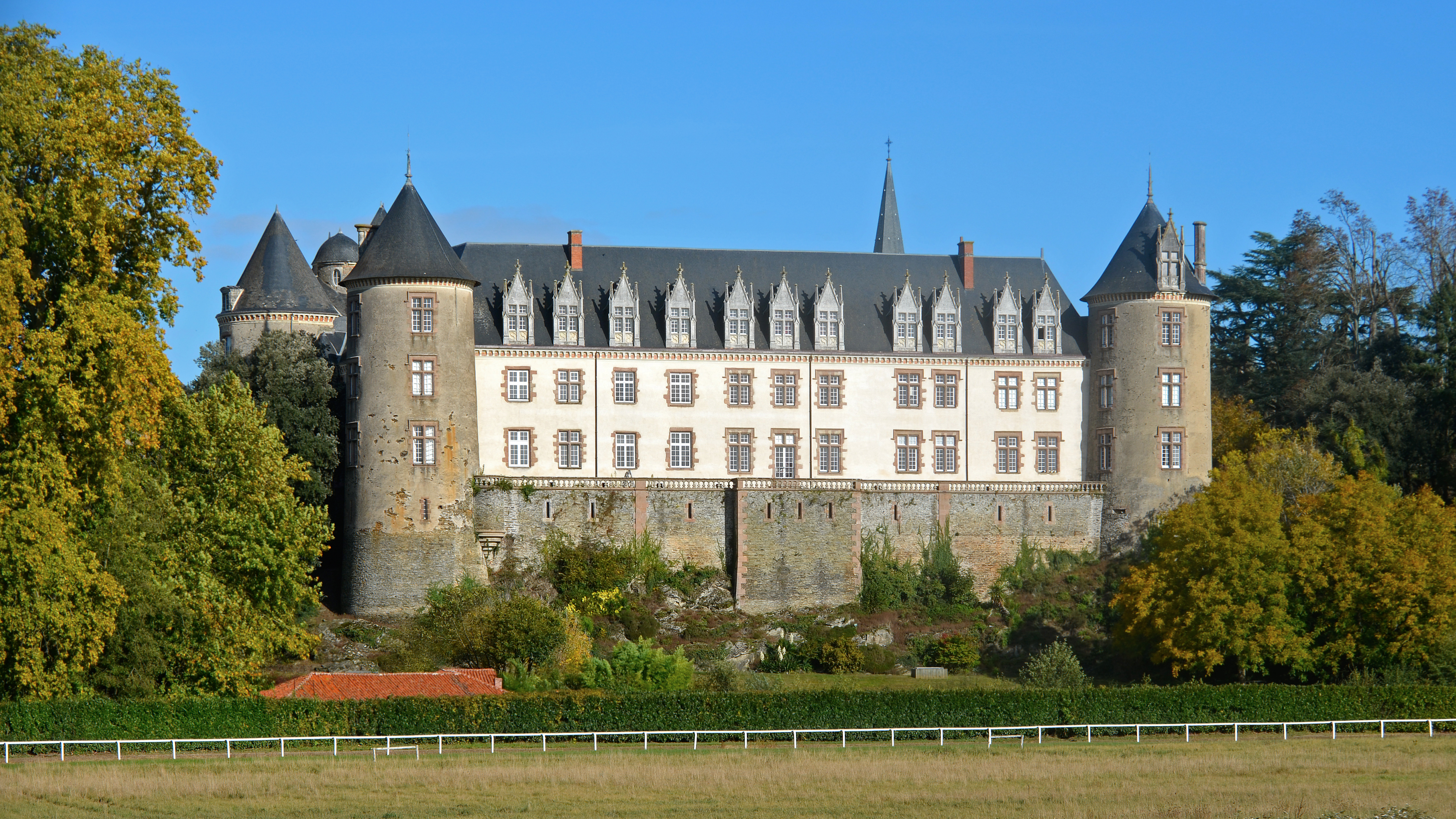
Beaupréau Castle

Beaupréau (French pronunciation: [bopʁ(e)o]) is a former commune in the Maine-et-Loire department in western France. Since 2015, it is a delegated commune of Beaupréau-en-Mauges.

== History ==
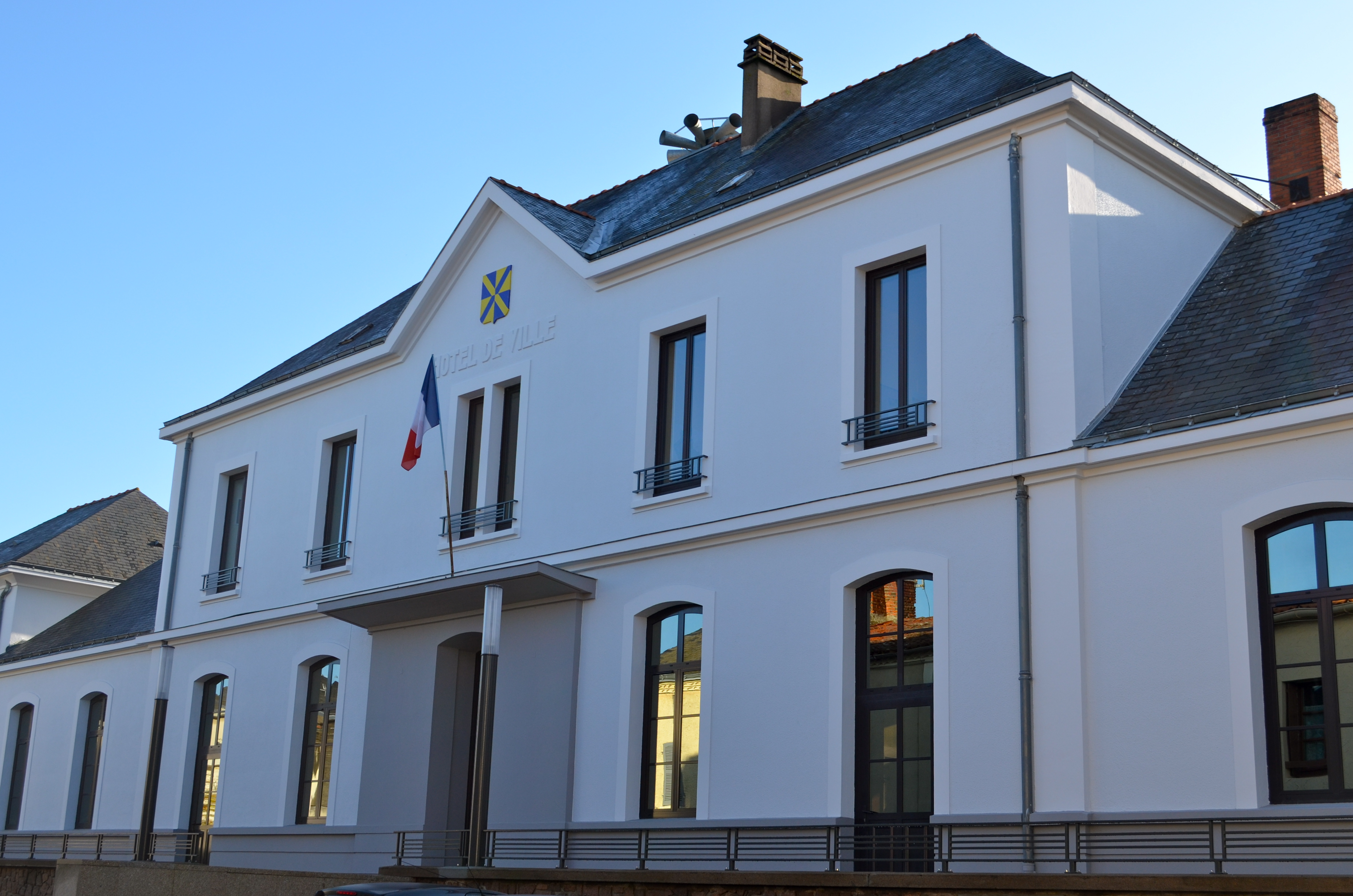
The Hôtel de Ville

The Hôtel de Ville was completed in 1959.

On 15 December 2015, Andrezé, Beaupréau, La Chapelle-du-Genêt, Gesté, Jallais, La Jubaudière, Le Pin-en-Mauges, La Poitevinière, Saint-Philbert-en-Mauges and Villedieu-la-Blouère merged becoming one commune called Beaupréau-en-Mauges.

== Geography ==
The commune is traversed by the river Èvre.

== Population ==
Historical population

Year	Pop.	±% p.a.
1793	2,678	—
1800	1,640	−6.77%
1806	1,893	+2.42%
1821	2,964	+3.03%
1831	3,207	+0.79%
1836	3,238	+0.19%
1841	3,887	+3.72%
1846	3,887	+0.00%
1851	3,669	−1.15%
1856	3,790	+0.65%
1861	3,821	+0.16%
1866	4,134	+1.59%
1872	3,758	−1.58%
1876	3,926	+1.10%
1881	3,878	−0.25%
1886	3,863	−0.08%
1891	3,857	−0.03%
1896	3,834	−0.12%

Year	Pop.	±% p.a.
1901	3,746	−0.46%
1906	3,497	−1.37%
1911	3,590	+0.53%
1921	3,531	−0.17%
1926	3,667	+0.76%
1931	3,693	+0.14%
1936	3,767	+0.40%
1946	4,190	+1.07%
1954	4,398	+0.61%
1962	4,577	+0.50%
1968	4,955	+1.33%
1975	5,428	+1.31%
1982	5,782	+0.91%
1990	5,937	+0.33%
1999	6,217	+0.51%
2006	6,456	+0.54%
2013	6,909	+0.97%
2022	7,794	+1.35%

Source: EHESS and INSEE

== Twin towns ==
- Abergavenny, Wales

== Notable people ==
- Damien Gaudin (Born 1986) professional cyclist
- Gabriel Gaté (Born 1955) chef
- Jean-Pascal Tricoire (Born 1963) business executive

== See also ==
- Communes of the Maine-et-Loire department
