= La Chaussaire =

- Part of Montrevault-sur-Èvre
- Location of La Chaussaire
- Location within France Location within Pays de la Loire
- Coordinates: 47°12′08″N 1°08′42″W
- Country: France
- Region: Pays de la Loire
- Department: Maine-et-Loire
- Arrondissement: Cholet
- Canton: Beaupréau
- Commune: Montrevault-sur-Èvre
- Area^{1}: 12.2 km^{2} (4.7 sq mi)
- Elevation: 83 m (272 ft)
- Highest elevation: 106 m (348 ft)
- Lowest elevation: 52 m (171 ft)
- Population (2022): 750
  - Density: 61/km^{2} (160/sq mi)
- Demonym(s): Chaussairois, Chaussairoise
- Time zone: UTC+01:00 (CET)
  - Summer (DST): UTC+02:00 (CEST)
- Postal code: 49600
- ^{1} French Land Register data, which excludes lakes, ponds, glaciers > 1 km^{2} (0.386 sq mi or 247 acres) and river estuaries.

La Chaussaire (French pronunciation: [la ʃosɛʁ]) is a former commune in the Maine-et-Loire department of western France.

== History ==
On 15 December 2015, La Boissière-sur-Èvre, Chaudron-en-Mauges, La Chaussaire, Le Fief-Sauvin, Le Fuilet, Montrevault, Le Puiset-Doré, Saint-Pierre-Montlimart, Saint-Quentin-en-Mauges, Saint-Rémy-en-Mauges and La Salle-et-Chapelle-Aubry merged becoming one commune called Montrevault-sur-Èvre.

== See also ==
- Communes of the Maine-et-Loire department
