= La Jubaudière =

- Part of Beaupréau-en-Mauges
- Location of La Jubaudière
- Location within France Location within Pays de la Loire
- Coordinates: 47°10′24″N 0°53′26″W
- Country: France
- Region: Pays de la Loire
- Department: Maine-et-Loire
- Arrondissement: Cholet
- Canton: Beaupréau
- Commune: Beaupréau-en-Mauges
- Area^{1}: 10.93 km^{2} (4.22 sq mi)
- Highest elevation: 118 m (387 ft)
- Lowest elevation: 65 m (213 ft)
- Population (2022): 1,246
  - Density: 114.0/km^{2} (295.3/sq mi)
- Demonym(s): Jubaudois, Jubaudoise
- Time zone: UTC+01:00 (CET)
  - Summer (DST): UTC+02:00 (CEST)
- Postal code: 49510
- ^{1} French Land Register data, which excludes lakes, ponds, glaciers > 1 km^{2} (0.386 sq mi or 247 acres) and river estuaries.

La Jubaudière (French pronunciation: [la ʒybodjɛʁ]) is a former commune in the Maine-et-Loire department in western France.

On 15 December 2015, Andrezé, Beaupréau, La Chapelle-du-Genêt, Gesté, Jallais, La Jubaudière, Le Pin-en-Mauges, La Poitevinière, Saint-Philbert-en-Mauges and Villedieu-la-Blouère merged becoming one commune called Beaupréau-en-Mauges.

== Geography ==
The commune is traversed by the Èvre river.

== See also ==
- Communes of the Maine-et-Loire department
