= Villedieu-la-Blouère =

- Part of Beaupréau-en-Mauges
- Coat of arms
- Location of Villedieu-la-Blouère
- Location within France Location within Pays de la Loire
- Coordinates: 47°08′52″N 1°03′46″W
- Country: France
- Region: Pays de la Loire
- Department: Maine-et-Loire
- Arrondissement: Cholet
- Canton: Beaupréau
- Commune: Beaupréau-en-Mauges
- Area^{1}: 14.35 km^{2} (5.54 sq mi)
- Highest elevation: 109 m (358 ft)
- Lowest elevation: 47 m (154 ft)
- Population (2022): 2,520
  - Density: 176/km^{2} (455/sq mi)
- Demonym(s): Théopolitain, Théopolitaine
- Time zone: UTC+01:00 (CET)
  - Summer (DST): UTC+02:00 (CEST)
- Postal code: 49450
- Website: Site officiel de Villedieu-la-Blouère
- ^{1} French Land Register data, which excludes lakes, ponds, glaciers > 1 km^{2} (0.386 sq mi or 247 acres) and river estuaries.

Villedieu-la-Blouère (French pronunciation: [vildjø la bluɛʁ]) is a former commune in the Maine-et-Loire department in western France. Its population was 2,520 in 2022.

On 15 December 2015, Andrezé, Beaupréau, La Chapelle-du-Genêt, Gesté, Jallais, La Jubaudière, Le Pin-en-Mauges, La Poitevinière, Saint-Philbert-en-Mauges and Villedieu-la-Blouère merged becoming one commune called Beaupréau-en-Mauges.

== See also ==
- Communes of the Maine-et-Loire department
