= Andrezé =

- Part of Beaupréau-en-Mauges
- Location of Andrezé
- Location within France Location within Pays de la Loire
- Coordinates: 47°10′19″N 0°57′08″W
- Country: France
- Region: Pays de la Loire
- Department: Maine-et-Loire
- Arrondissement: Cholet
- Canton: Beaupréau
- Commune: Beaupréau-en-Mauges
- Area^{1}: 21.29 km^{2} (8.22 sq mi)
- Elevation: 157 m (515 ft)
- Highest elevation: 117 m (384 ft)
- Lowest elevation: 52 m (171 ft)
- Population (2022): 2,030
  - Density: 95.3/km^{2} (247/sq mi)
- Time zone: UTC+01:00 (CET)
  - Summer (DST): UTC+02:00 (CEST)
- Postal code: 49600
- ^{1} French Land Register data, which excludes lakes, ponds, glaciers > 1 km^{2} (0.386 sq mi or 247 acres) and river estuaries.

Andrezé (French pronunciation: [ɑ̃dʁəze]) is a former commune in the Maine-et-Loire department in western France.

On 15 December 2015, Andrezé, Beaupréau, La Chapelle-du-Genêt, Gesté, Jallais, La Jubaudière, Le Pin-en-Mauges, La Poitevinière, Saint-Philbert-en-Mauges and Villedieu-la-Blouère merged becoming one commune called Beaupréau-en-Mauges.

== Population ==
Historical population

| Year | Pop. | ±% p.a. |
|---|---|---|
| 1793 | 1,100 | — |
| 1800 | 523 | −10.08% |
| 1806 | 937 | +10.21% |
| 1821 | 1,095 | +1.04% |
| 1831 | 1,417 | +2.61% |
| 1836 | 1,401 | −0.23% |
| 1841 | 1,372 | −0.42% |
| 1846 | 1,428 | +0.80% |
| 1851 | 1,415 | −0.18% |
| 1856 | 1,450 | +0.49% |
| 1861 | 1,474 | +0.33% |
| 1866 | 1,497 | +0.31% |
| 1872 | 1,585 | +0.96% |
| 1876 | 1,358 | −3.79% |
| 1881 | 1,298 | −0.90% |
| 1886 | 1,310 | +0.18% |
| 1891 | 1,263 | −0.73% |
| 1896 | 1,275 | +0.19% |

| Year | Pop. | ±% p.a. |
|---|---|---|
| 1901 | 1,251 | −0.38% |
| 1906 | 1,203 | −0.78% |
| 1911 | 1,147 | −0.95% |
| 1921 | 996 | −1.40% |
| 1926 | 1,026 | +0.60% |
| 1931 | 1,057 | +0.60% |
| 1936 | 1,053 | −0.08% |
| 1946 | 1,042 | −0.10% |
| 1954 | 1,149 | +1.23% |
| 1962 | 1,262 | +1.18% |
| 1968 | 1,312 | +0.65% |
| 1975 | 1,371 | +0.63% |
| 1982 | 1,699 | +3.11% |
| 1990 | 1,803 | +0.75% |
| 1999 | 1,799 | −0.02% |
| 2006 | 1,798 | −0.01% |
| 2022 | 2,030 | +0.76% |

Source: EHESS and INSEE

== See also ==
- Communes of the Maine-et-Loire department
