= Bourgneuf =

Bourgneuf may refer to the following places in France:

- Bourgneuf, Charente-Maritime, in the Charente-Maritime département
- Bourgneuf, Savoie, in the Savoie département
- Bourgneuf-en-Mauges, in the Maine-et-Loire département
- Bourgneuf-en-Retz, in the Loire-Atlantique département
- Baie de Bourgneuf, where some forces retreated to during the 1342 Battle of Brest
