= Gesté =

- Part of Beaupréau-en-Mauges
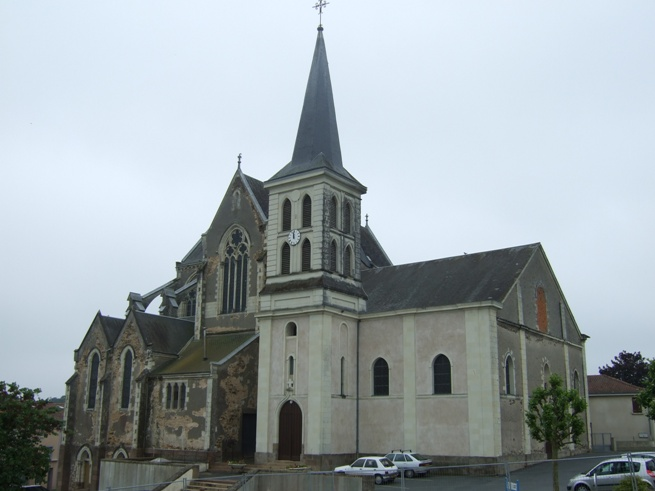
- Extérieur de l'église Saint-Pierre
- Location of Gesté
- Location within France Location within Pays de la Loire
- Coordinates: 47°10′53″N 1°06′33″W
- Country: France
- Region: Pays de la Loire
- Department: Maine-et-Loire
- Arrondissement: Cholet
- Canton: Beaupréau
- Commune: Beaupréau-en-Mauges
- Area^{1}: 35.55 km^{2} (13.73 sq mi)
- Highest elevation: 104 m (341 ft)
- Lowest elevation: 48 m (157 ft)
- Population (2022): 2,769
  - Density: 77.89/km^{2} (201.7/sq mi)
- Demonym(s): Gestois, Gestoise
- Time zone: UTC+01:00 (CET)
  - Summer (DST): UTC+02:00 (CEST)
- Postal code: 49600
- ^{1} French Land Register data, which excludes lakes, ponds, glaciers > 1 km^{2} (0.386 sq mi or 247 acres) and river estuaries.

Gesté (French pronunciation: [ʒɛste]) is a former commune in the Maine-et-Loire department in western France.

On 15 December 2015, Andrezé, Beaupréau, La Chapelle-du-Genêt, Gesté, Jallais, La Jubaudière, Le Pin-en-Mauges, La Poitevinière, Saint-Philbert-en-Mauges and Villedieu-la-Blouère merged, becoming one commune called Beaupréau-en-Mauges.

== See also ==
- Communes of the Maine-et-Loire department
