= Montrevault-sur-Èvre =

- Commune
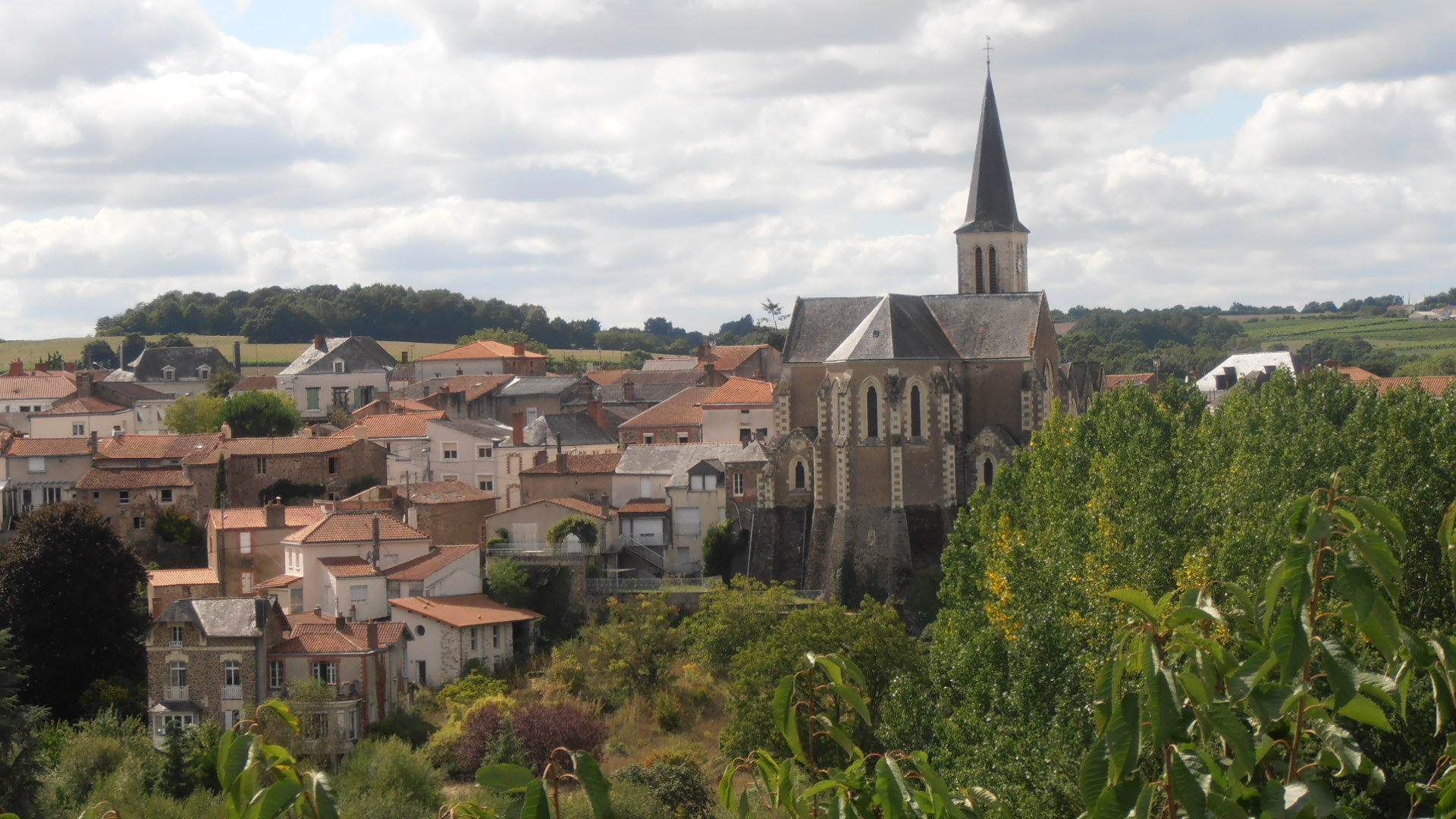
- A general view of Montrevault-sur-Èvre
- Location of Montrevault-sur-Èvre
- Location within France Location within Pays de la Loire
- Coordinates: 47°15′44″N 1°02′39″W
- Country: France
- Region: Pays de la Loire
- Department: Maine-et-Loire
- Arrondissement: Cholet
- Canton: Beaupréau-en-Mauges
- Intercommunality: Mauges Communauté

Government
  - Mayor (2020–2026): Christophe Dougé
- Area^{1}: 198.85 km^{2} (76.78 sq mi)
- Population (2023): 15,726
  - Density: 79.085/km^{2} (204.83/sq mi)
- Demonym(s): Montrebellien, Montrebellienne
- Time zone: UTC+01:00 (CET)
  - Summer (DST): UTC+02:00 (CEST)
- INSEE/Postal code: 49218 /49110, 49600, 49270
- ^{1} French Land Register data, which excludes lakes, ponds, glaciers > 1 km^{2} (0.386 sq mi or 247 acres) and river estuaries.

Montrevault-sur-Èvre (French pronunciation: [mɔ̃tʁəvo syʁ ɛvʁ], literally Montrevault on Èvre) is a commune in the Maine-et-Loire department in western France. Montrevault is the municipal seat.

== History ==
It was established on 15 December 2015 and consists of the former communes of La Boissière-sur-Èvre, Chaudron-en-Mauges, La Chaussaire, Le Fief-Sauvin, Le Fuilet, Montrevault, Le Puiset-Doré, Saint-Pierre-Montlimart, Saint-Quentin-en-Mauges, Saint-Rémy-en-Mauges and La Salle-et-Chapelle-Aubry.

== Population ==
Historical population
Year	Pop.	±% p.a.
1968	14,301	—
1975	14,438	+0.14%
1982	14,680	+0.24%
1990	14,640	−0.03%
1999	14,047	−0.46%
2007	14,980	+0.81%
2012	15,981	+1.30%
2017	15,859	−0.15%
2023	15,726	−0.14%
Populations of the area corresponding with the commune of Montrevault-sur-Èvre at 1 January 2025. Source: INSEE

== See also ==
- Communes of the Maine-et-Loire department
