= Le Pin-en-Mauges =

- Part of Beaupréau-en-Mauges
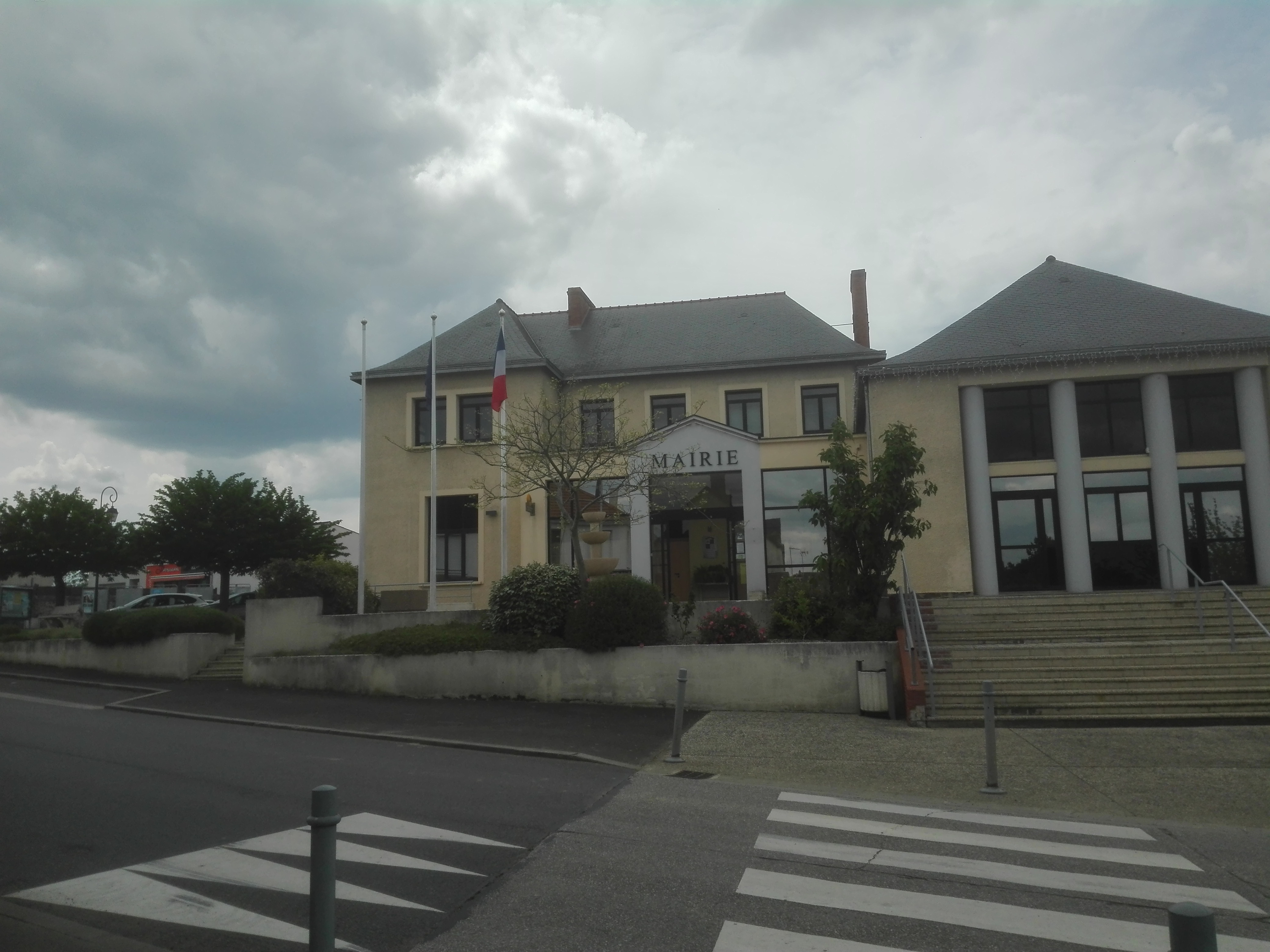
- Town hall
- Location of Le Pin-en-Mauges
- Location within France Location within Pays de la Loire
- Coordinates: 47°15′16″N 0°53′52″W
- Country: France
- Region: Pays de la Loire
- Department: Maine-et-Loire
- Arrondissement: Cholet
- Canton: Beaupréau
- Commune: Beaupréau-en-Mauges
- Area^{1}: 17.07 km^{2} (6.59 sq mi)
- Elevation: 95 m (312 ft)
- Highest elevation: 129 m (423 ft)
- Lowest elevation: 79 m (259 ft)
- Population (2022): 1,375
  - Density: 80.55/km^{2} (208.6/sq mi)
- Demonym(s): Pinois, Pinoise
- Time zone: UTC+01:00 (CET)
  - Summer (DST): UTC+02:00 (CEST)
- Postal code: 49110
- Website: Site de la commune
- ^{1} French Land Register data, which excludes lakes, ponds, glaciers > 1 km^{2} (0.386 sq mi or 247 acres) and river estuaries.

Le Pin-en-Mauges (French pronunciation: [lə pɛ̃ ɑ̃ moʒ]) is a former commune in the Maine-et-Loire department in western France.

On 15 December 2015, Andrezé, Beaupréau, La Chapelle-du-Genêt, Gesté, Jallais, La Jubaudière, Le Pin-en-Mauges, La Poitevinière, Saint-Philbert-en-Mauges and Villedieu-la-Blouère merged becoming one commune called Beaupréau-en-Mauges.

== See also ==
- Communes of the Maine-et-Loire department
