= Le Puiset-Doré =

- Part of Montrevault-sur-Èvre
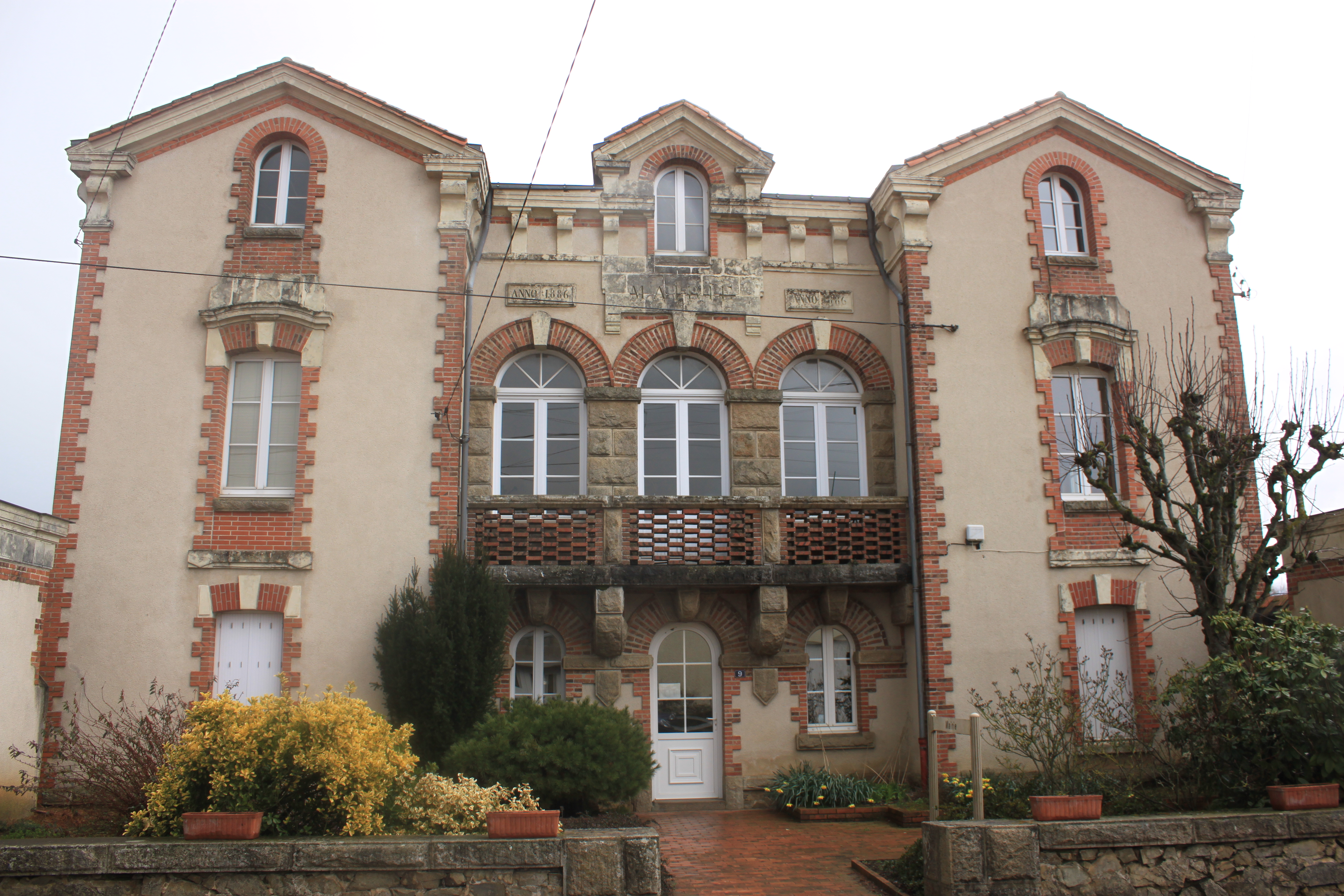
- Town hall
- Location of Le Puiset-Doré
- Location within France Location within Pays de la Loire
- Coordinates: 47°13′59″N 1°06′51″W
- Country: France
- Region: Pays de la Loire
- Department: Maine-et-Loire
- Arrondissement: Cholet
- Canton: Beaupréau
- Commune: Montrevault-sur-Èvre
- Area^{1}: 22.62 km^{2} (8.73 sq mi)
- Elevation: 91 m (299 ft)
- Highest elevation: 109 m (358 ft)
- Lowest elevation: 68 m (223 ft)
- Population (2022): 1,159
  - Density: 51.24/km^{2} (132.7/sq mi)
- Demonym(s): Puiset-Doréen, Puiset-Doréenne
- Time zone: UTC+01:00 (CET)
  - Summer (DST): UTC+02:00 (CEST)
- Postal code: 49600
- ^{1} French Land Register data, which excludes lakes, ponds, glaciers > 1 km^{2} (0.386 sq mi or 247 acres) and river estuaries.

Le Puiset-Doré (French pronunciation: [lə pɥizɛ dɔʁe]) is a former commune in the Maine-et-Loire department in western France.

== History ==
On 15 December 2015, La Boissière-sur-Èvre, Chaudron-en-Mauges, La Chaussaire, Le Fief-Sauvin, Le Fuilet, Montrevault, Le Puiset-Doré, Saint-Pierre-Montlimart, Saint-Quentin-en-Mauges, Saint-Rémy-en-Mauges and La Salle-et-Chapelle-Aubry merged becoming one commune called Montrevault-sur-Èvre.

== See also ==
- Communes of the Maine-et-Loire department
