= La Chapelle-du-Genêt =

- Part of Beaupréau-en-Mauges
- Location of La Chapelle-du-Genêt
- Location within France Location within Pays de la Loire
- Coordinates: 47°11′02″N 1°01′06″W
- Country: France
- Region: Pays de la Loire
- Department: Maine-et-Loire
- Arrondissement: Cholet
- Canton: Beaupréau
- Commune: Beaupréau-en-Mauges
- Area^{1}: 9.25 km^{2} (3.57 sq mi)
- Elevation: 111 m (364 ft)
- Highest elevation: 114 m (374 ft)
- Lowest elevation: 42 m (138 ft)
- Population (2022): 1,180
  - Density: 128/km^{2} (330/sq mi)
- Demonym(s): Capello-Genestois, Capello-Genestoise
- Time zone: UTC+01:00 (CET)
  - Summer (DST): UTC+02:00 (CEST)
- Postal code: 49600
- ^{1} French Land Register data, which excludes lakes, ponds, glaciers > 1 km^{2} (0.386 sq mi or 247 acres) and river estuaries.

La Chapelle-du-Genêt (French pronunciation: [la ʃapɛl dy ʒənɛ]) is a former commune in the Maine-et-Loire department of western France.

On 15 December 2015, Andrezé, Beaupréau, La Chapelle-du-Genêt, Gesté, Jallais, La Jubaudière, Le Pin-en-Mauges, La Poitevinière, Saint-Philbert-en-Mauges and Villedieu-la-Blouère merged becoming one commune called Beaupréau-en-Mauges.

== Geography ==
The commune is traversed by the Èvre river.

== See also ==
- Communes of the Maine-et-Loire department
