= Saint-Laurent-de-la-Plaine =

- Part of Mauges-sur-Loire
- Location of Saint-Laurent-de-la-Plaine
- Location within France Location within Pays de la Loire
- Coordinates: 47°19′06″N 0°48′11″W
- Country: France
- Region: Pays de la Loire
- Department: Maine-et-Loire
- Arrondissement: Cholet
- Canton: Saint-Florent-le-Vieil
- Commune: Mauges-sur-Loire
- Area^{1}: 18.44 km^{2} (7.12 sq mi)
- Elevation: 82 m (269 ft)
- Highest elevation: 113 m (371 ft)
- Lowest elevation: 29 m (95 ft)
- Population (2022): 1,570
  - Density: 85.1/km^{2} (221/sq mi)
- Time zone: UTC+01:00 (CET)
  - Summer (DST): UTC+02:00 (CEST)
- Postal code: 49290
- ^{1} French Land Register data, which excludes lakes, ponds, glaciers > 1 km^{2} (0.386 sq mi or 247 acres) and river estuaries.

Saint-Laurent-de-la-Plaine (French pronunciation: [sɛ̃ loʁɑ̃ də la plɛn]) is a former commune in the Maine-et-Loire department in western France. On 15 December 2015, it was merged into the new commune Mauges-sur-Loire. Its population was 1,570 in 2022.

== See also ==
- Communes of the Maine-et-Loire department
