= Mauges Communauté =

- Communauté d'agglomération
- Interactive map of Mauges Communauté
- Country: France
- Region: Pays de la Loire
- Department: Maine-et-Loire
- No. of communes: {{{nbcomm}}}
- Established: 2016
- Area: 1,314.6 km^{2} (507.6 sq mi)
- Population (2017): 120,590
  - Density: 91.731/km^{2} (237.58/sq mi)
- Website: www.maugescommunaute.fr

Mauges Communauté is a Communauté d'agglomération, an intercommunal structure, in the Maine-et-Loire department, in the Pays de la Loire region, western France. It was created in January 2016. Its seat is in Beaupréau-en-Mauges. Its area is 1314.6 km^{2}. Its population was 120,590 in 2017.

== Composition ==
The communauté d'agglomération consists of the following 6 communes:

1. Beaupréau-en-Mauges
2. Chemillé-en-Anjou
3. Mauges-sur-Loire
4. Montrevault-sur-Èvre
5. Orée-d'Anjou
6. Sèvremoine
