= La Chapelle-Saint-Florent =

- Part of Mauges-sur-Loire
- Location of La Chapelle-Saint-Florent
- Location within France Location within Pays de la Loire
- Coordinates: 47°20′04″N 1°03′17″W
- Country: France
- Region: Pays de la Loire
- Department: Maine-et-Loire
- Arrondissement: Cholet
- Canton: Saint-Florent-le-Vieil
- Commune: Mauges-sur-Loire
- Area^{1}: 15.84 km^{2} (6.12 sq mi)
- Elevation: 88 m (289 ft)
- Highest elevation: 102 m (335 ft)
- Lowest elevation: 7 m (23 ft)
- Population (2022): 1,532
  - Density: 96.72/km^{2} (250.5/sq mi)
- Demonym(s): Capello-Florentais, Capello-Florentaise
- Time zone: UTC+01:00 (CET)
  - Summer (DST): UTC+02:00 (CEST)
- Postal code: 49410
- ^{1} French Land Register data, which excludes lakes, ponds, glaciers > 1 km^{2} (0.386 sq mi or 247 acres) and river estuaries.

La Chapelle-Saint-Florent (French pronunciation: [la ʃapɛl sɛ̃ flɔʁɑ̃]) is a former commune in the Maine-et-Loire department of western France. On 15 December 2015, it was merged into the new commune Mauges-sur-Loire.

== Geography ==
The commune is traversed by the Èvre river.

== See also ==
- Communes of the Maine-et-Loire department
