= Le Marillais =

- Part of Mauges-sur-Loire
- Location of Le Marillais
- Location within France Location within Pays de la Loire
- Coordinates: 47°21′32″N 1°04′20″W
- Country: France
- Region: Pays de la Loire
- Department: Maine-et-Loire
- Arrondissement: Cholet
- Canton: Saint-Florent-le-Vieil
- Commune: Mauges-sur-Loire
- Area^{1}: 9.47 km^{2} (3.66 sq mi)
- Elevation: 28 m (92 ft)
- Highest elevation: 36 m (118 ft)
- Lowest elevation: 6 m (20 ft)
- Population (2022): 1,077
  - Density: 114/km^{2} (295/sq mi)
- Demonym(s): Marillaisien, Marillaisienne
- Time zone: UTC+01:00 (CET)
  - Summer (DST): UTC+02:00 (CEST)
- Postal code: 49410
- ^{1} French Land Register data, which excludes lakes, ponds, glaciers > 1 km^{2} (0.386 sq mi or 247 acres) and river estuaries.

Le Marillais (French pronunciation: [lə maʁijɛ]) is a former commune in the Maine-et-Loire department in western France. On 15 December 2015, it was merged into the new commune Mauges-sur-Loire.

== Geography ==
The river Èvre flows into the Loire in the commune, some 3 km (1.9 mi) east of the village.

== See also ==
- Communes of the Maine-et-Loire department
