= Beausse =

- Part of Mauges-sur-Loire
- Coat of arms
- Location of Beausse
- Location within France Location within Pays de la Loire
- Coordinates: 47°19′18″N 0°55′33″W
- Country: France
- Region: Pays de la Loire
- Department: Maine-et-Loire
- Arrondissement: Cholet
- Canton: La Pommeraye
- Commune: Mauges-sur-Loire
- Area^{1}: 5.36 km^{2} (2.07 sq mi)
- Elevation: 163 m (535 ft)
- Highest elevation: 156 m (512 ft)
- Lowest elevation: 83 m (272 ft)
- Population (2023): 407
  - Density: 75.9/km^{2} (197/sq mi)
- Time zone: UTC+01:00 (CET)
  - Summer (DST): UTC+02:00 (CEST)
- Postal code: 49410
- ^{1} French Land Register data, which excludes lakes, ponds, glaciers > 1 km^{2} (0.386 sq mi or 247 acres) and river estuaries.

Beausse (French pronunciation: [bos]) is a former commune in the Maine-et-Loire department in western France. The village is located between Angers and Cholet. In 2023, Beausse had 407 inhabitants.

On 15 December 2015, it was merged into the new commune Mauges-sur-Loire.

== See also ==
- Communes of the Maine-et-Loire department
