= Montjean-sur-Loire =

- Part of Mauges-sur-Loire
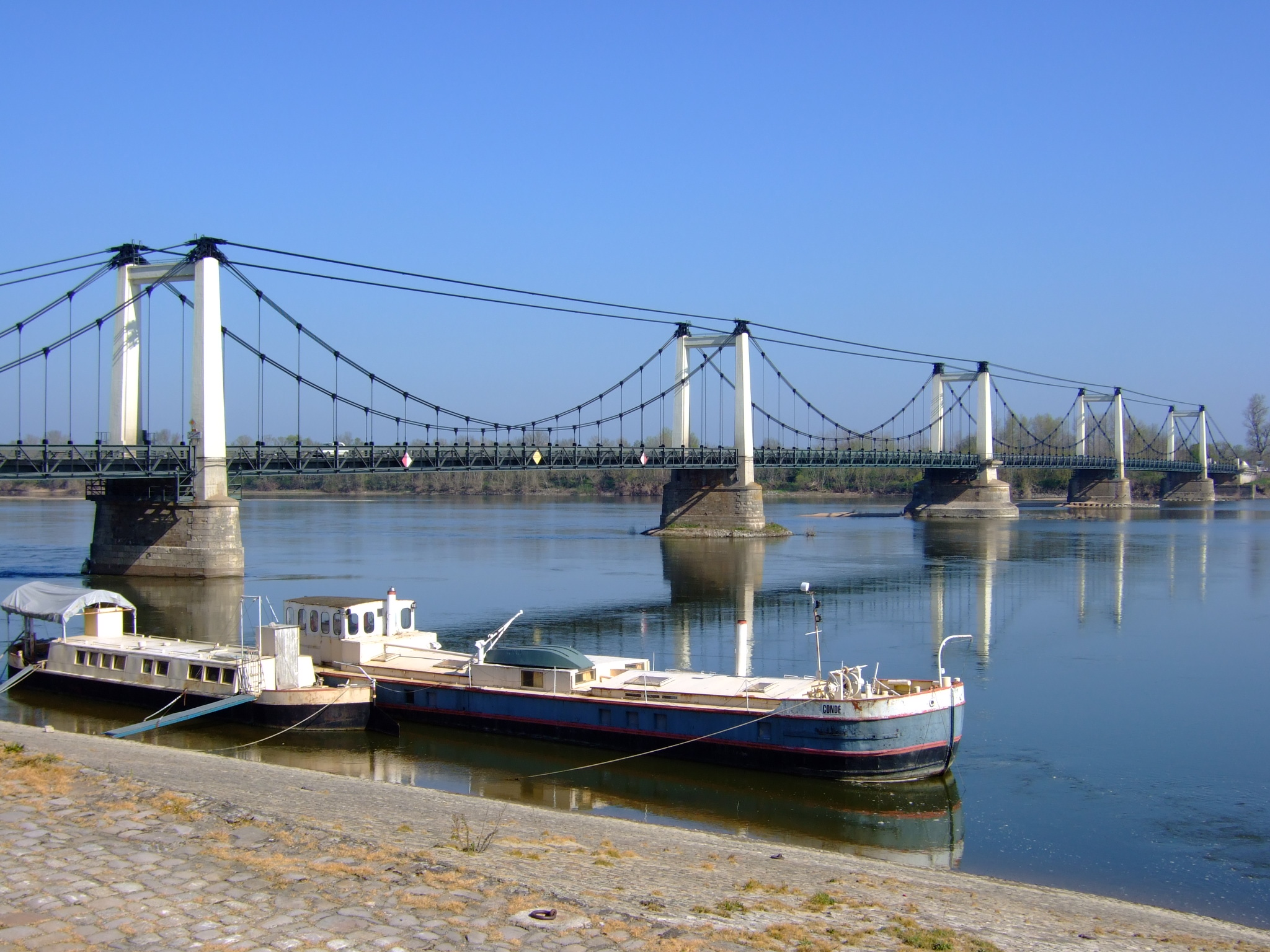
- Loire bridge
- Location of Montjean-sur-Loire
- Location within France Location within Pays de la Loire
- Coordinates: 47°23′21″N 0°51′35″W
- Country: France
- Region: Pays de la Loire
- Department: Maine-et-Loire
- Arrondissement: Cholet
- Canton: Saint-Florent-le-Vieil
- Commune: Mauges-sur-Loire
- Area^{1}: 19.33 km^{2} (7.46 sq mi)
- Elevation: 19 m (62 ft)
- Highest elevation: 78 m (256 ft)
- Lowest elevation: 8 m (26 ft)
- Population (2022): 3,384
  - Density: 175.1/km^{2} (453.4/sq mi)
- Demonym(s): Montjeannais, Montjeannaise
- Time zone: UTC+01:00 (CET)
  - Summer (DST): UTC+02:00 (CEST)
- Postal code: 49570
- Website: Site officiel de Montjean sur Loire
- ^{1} French Land Register data, which excludes lakes, ponds, glaciers > 1 km^{2} (0.386 sq mi or 247 acres) and river estuaries.

Montjean-sur-Loire (French pronunciation: [mɔ̃ʒɑ̃ syʁ lwaʁ], literally Montjean on Loire) is a former commune in the Maine-et-Loire department in western France. On 15 December 2015, it was merged into the new commune Mauges-sur-Loire.

== See also ==
- Communes of the Maine-et-Loire department
