= Le Mesnil-en-Vallée =

- Part of Mauges-sur-Loire
- Location of Le Mesnil-en-Vallée
- Location within France Location within Pays de la Loire
- Coordinates: 47°22′00″N 0°56′03″W
- Country: France
- Region: Pays de la Loire
- Department: Maine-et-Loire
- Arrondissement: Cholet
- Canton: Saint-Florent-le-Vieil
- Commune: Mauges-sur-Loire
- Area^{1}: 17.72 km^{2} (6.84 sq mi)
- Elevation: 50 m (160 ft)
- Highest elevation: 127 m (417 ft)
- Lowest elevation: 7 m (23 ft)
- Population (2022): 1,486
  - Density: 83.86/km^{2} (217.2/sq mi)
- Demonym(s): Mesnilois, Mesniloise
- Time zone: UTC+01:00 (CET)
  - Summer (DST): UTC+02:00 (CEST)
- Postal code: 49410
- ^{1} French Land Register data, which excludes lakes, ponds, glaciers > 1 km^{2} (0.386 sq mi or 247 acres) and river estuaries.

Le Mesnil-en-Vallée (French pronunciation: [lə mɛnil ɑ̃ vale]) is a former commune in the Maine-et-Loire department in western France. On 15 December 2015, it was merged into the new commune Mauges-sur-Loire.

== See also ==
- Communes of the Maine-et-Loire department
