= Ernestine Chassebœuf =

Ernestine Chassebœuf (née Troispoux) (1910–c.2005) was a (fictitious) French letter writer.

== Life ==
Ernestine Chassebœuf spent all her life in Anjou. Born in Botz-en-Mauges, Maine-et-Loire, she married, in 1928, Edmond Chassebœuf, who died in 1970. She stayed most of her life in Coutures, in Maine-et-Loire, where she took care of her garden and her chickens.

In 1999, she began to write letters denouncing, in a truculent and naive style, inefficiencies and inequities. Alain Rémond and Jean Lebrun enabled her to gain a little celebrity. Especially at the occasion of the debate about free lending of books in libraries, she wrote to all the writers who had signed the petition, demanding the withdrawal of their books from public libraries until an agreement had been found. After this start, she continued to write to people in the economic, political, and literary world, or in the media; her common sense and frankness highlighted inconsistencies and mediocrity in French society.

== Works ==
- The wheelbarrow and the two orphans. Letters on the right lending library, Vauchrétien: I. Davy; Angers : Éd. Deleatur, 2000 Davy; Angers: Ed. 2000
- Ernestine writes everywhere, Volume 1 (1999) Paris, Ginkgo, 2004, ISBN 978-2-84679-015-4
- Ernestine writes everywhere, Volume 2 Paris, Ginkgo, 2004, ISBN 978-2-84679-021-5
- Ernestine writes everywhere , Volume 3 (Correspondence 2000-2005), Paris, Ginkgo publisher, 2005. ISBN 978-2-84679-034-5

== See also ==
- Jean-Pierre Brisset
