= Saint-Florent-le-Vieil =

- Part of Mauges-sur-Loire
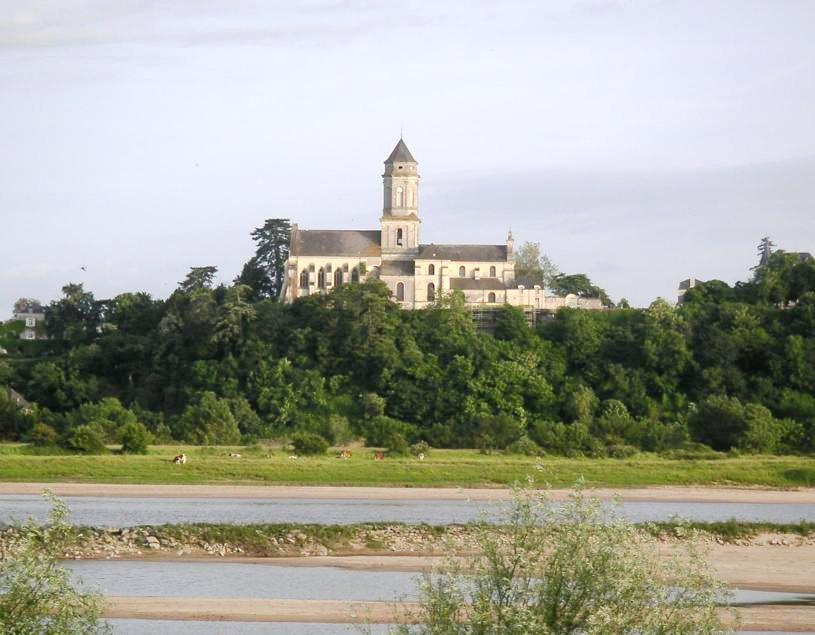

- Coat of arms
- Location of Saint-Florent-le-Vieil
- Location within France Location within Pays de la Loire
- Coordinates: 47°21′44″N 1°00′54″W
- Country: France
- Region: Pays de la Loire
- Department: Maine-et-Loire
- Arrondissement: Cholet
- Canton: Saint-Florent-le-Vieil
- Commune: Mauges-sur-Loire
- Area^{1}: 24.89 km^{2} (9.61 sq mi)
- Elevation: 40 m (130 ft)
- Highest elevation: 130 m (430 ft)
- Lowest elevation: 7 m (23 ft)
- Population (2022): 2,896
  - Density: 116.4/km^{2} (301.4/sq mi)
- Time zone: UTC+01:00 (CET)
  - Summer (DST): UTC+02:00 (CEST)
- Postal code: 49410
- ^{1} French Land Register data, which excludes lakes, ponds, glaciers > 1 km^{2} (0.386 sq mi or 247 acres) and river estuaries.

Saint-Florent-le-Vieil (French pronunciation: [sɛ̃ flɔʁɑ̃ lə vjɛj]) is a former commune in the Maine-et-Loire department in western France. On 15 December 2015, it was merged into the new commune Mauges-sur-Loire. Its population was 2,896 in 2022. It is named after Saint Florent.

The river Èvre forms the commune's western border, then flows into the Loire, forming the commune's northern border.

Saint-Florent-le-Viel is located on the La Loire à vélo, itself a subset of the EuroVelo6, the trans-European bicycle route.

== See also ==
- Communes of the Maine-et-Loire department
