= Saint-Laurent-du-Mottay =

- Part of Mauges-sur-Loire
- Location of Saint-Laurent-du-Mottay
- Location within France Location within Pays de la Loire
- Coordinates: 47°21′02″N 0°56′54″W
- Country: France
- Region: Pays de la Loire
- Department: Maine-et-Loire
- Arrondissement: Cholet
- Canton: La Pommeraye
- Commune: Mauges-sur-Loire
- Area^{1}: 14.63 km^{2} (5.65 sq mi)
- Elevation: 70 m (230 ft)
- Highest elevation: 137 m (449 ft)
- Lowest elevation: 8 m (26 ft)
- Population (2022): 751
  - Density: 51.3/km^{2} (133/sq mi)
- Time zone: UTC+01:00 (CET)
  - Summer (DST): UTC+02:00 (CEST)
- Postal code: 49410
- ^{1} French Land Register data, which excludes lakes, ponds, glaciers > 1 km^{2} (0.386 sq mi or 247 acres) and river estuaries.

Saint-Laurent-du-Mottay (French pronunciation: [sɛ̃ loʁɑ̃ dy mɔtɛ]) is a former commune in the Maine-et-Loire department in western France. On 15 December 2015, it was merged into the new commune Mauges-sur-Loire. Its population was 751 in 2022.

== See also ==
- Communes of the Maine-et-Loire department
