= Botz-en-Mauges =

- Part of Mauges-sur-Loire
- Location of Botz-en-Mauges
- Location within France Location within Pays de la Loire
- Coordinates: 47°18′28″N 1°00′01″W
- Country: France
- Region: Pays de la Loire
- Department: Maine-et-Loire
- Arrondissement: Cholet
- Canton: Saint-Florent-le-Vieil
- Commune: Mauges-sur-Loire
- Area^{1}: 15.74 km^{2} (6.08 sq mi)
- Elevation: 94 m (308 ft)
- Highest elevation: 141 m (463 ft)
- Lowest elevation: 11 m (36 ft)
- Population (2023): 852
  - Density: 54.1/km^{2} (140/sq mi)
- Time zone: UTC+01:00 (CET)
  - Summer (DST): UTC+02:00 (CEST)
- Postal code: 49110
- ^{1} French Land Register data, which excludes lakes, ponds, glaciers > 1 km^{2} (0.386 sq mi or 247 acres) and river estuaries.

Botz-en-Mauges (French pronunciation: [bɔts ɑ̃ moʒ]) is a former commune in the Maine-et-Loire department in western France. On 15 December 2015, it was merged into the new commune Mauges-sur-Loire.

== Geography ==
The commune is traversed by the Èvre river.

== Personalities ==
- Ernestine Chassebœuf

== See also ==
- Communes of the Maine-et-Loire department
