= Alain Rémond =

French humor columnist

- Born: 15 November 1946 (age 79); Mortain, Manche, France
- Occupation: Columnist
- Employer: La Croix

Alain Rémond (born 15 November 1946) is a famous French humor columnist. He was born in Mortain (Manche).

== Biography ==
Alain Rémond was born into a modest Breton family. He studied philosophy, became a teacher of audiovisual moving later on to film review.

In 1973, Alain got a job in Télérama where he created the well-known and hilarious column "Mon oeil" (which means both "My eye" and "I don't believe you"). He became an editor and continued until 2002.

Now, he writes in the centrist Marianne (but has said he voted for Ségolène Royal in French presidential Election of 2007) and in the Catholic La Croix.

He has published many books about his idols like Yves Montand or Bob Dylan, and has written about his childhood.

== See also ==
- Marianne
- La Croix
- Ernestine Chassebœuf
