= Beaupréau-en-Mauges =

- Commune
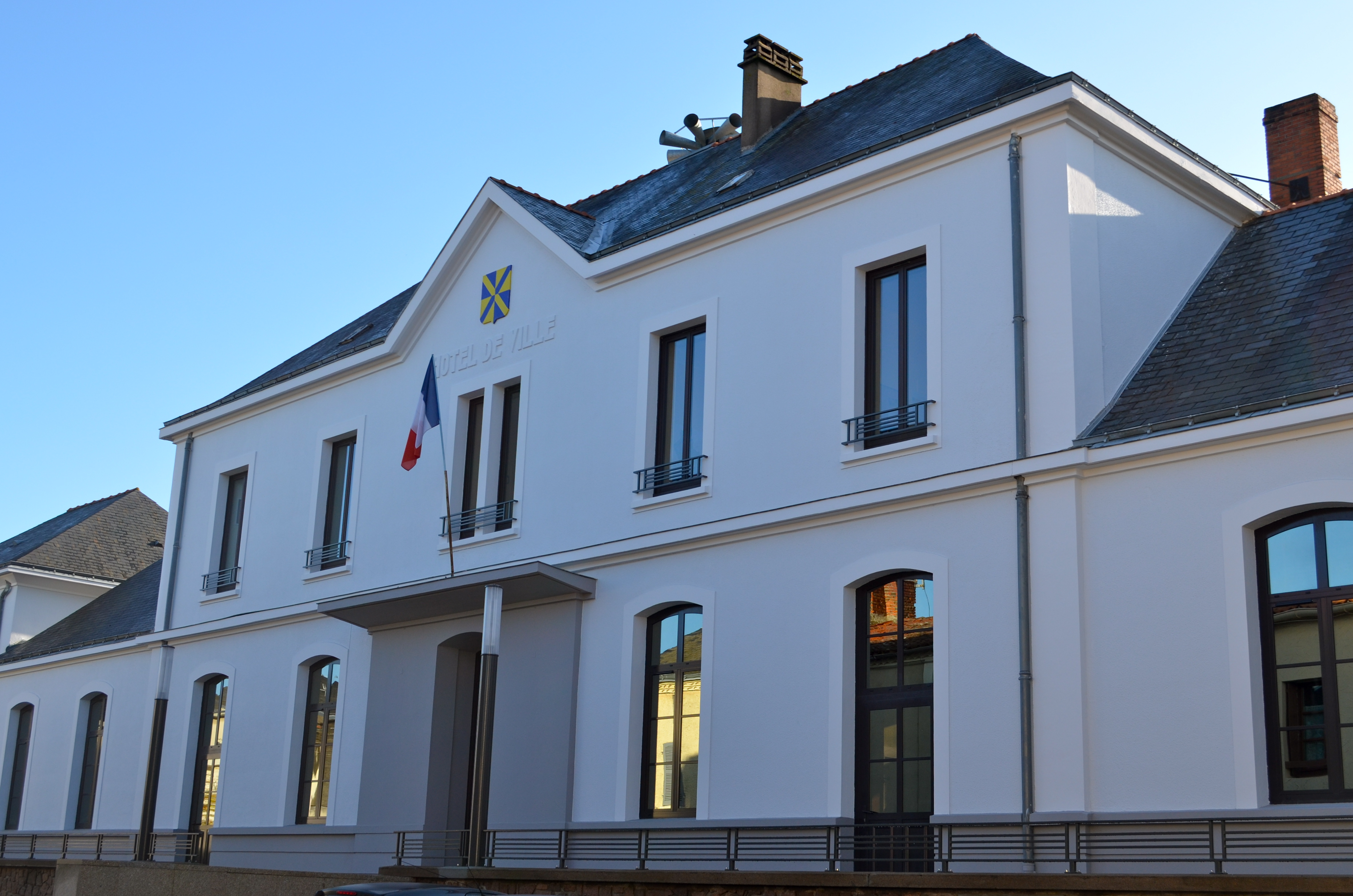
- The Hôtel de Ville
- Location of Beaupréau-en-Mauges
- Location within France Location within Pays de la Loire
- Coordinates: 47°12′10″N 0°59′36″W
- Country: France
- Region: Pays de la Loire
- Department: Maine-et-Loire
- Arrondissement: Cholet
- Canton: Beaupréau-en-Mauges
- Intercommunality: Mauges Communauté

Government
  - Mayor (2020–2026): Franck Aubin
- Area^{1}: 230.45 km^{2} (88.98 sq mi)
- Highest elevation: 129 m (423 ft)
- Lowest elevation: 32 m (105 ft)
- Population (2023): 23,989
  - Density: 104.10/km^{2} (269.61/sq mi)
- Time zone: UTC+01:00 (CET)
  - Summer (DST): UTC+02:00 (CEST)
- INSEE/Postal code: 49023 /49600
- ^{1} French Land Register data, which excludes lakes, ponds, glaciers > 1 km^{2} (0.386 sq mi or 247 acres) and river estuaries.

Beaupréau-en-Mauges (French pronunciation: [bopʁ(e)o ɑ̃ moʒ]) is a commune in the Maine-et-Loire department in western France.

It was established on 15 December 2015 by the merger of the former communes of Andrezé, Beaupréau, La Chapelle-du-Genêt, Gesté, Jallais, La Jubaudière, Le Pin-en-Mauges, La Poitevinière, Saint-Philbert-en-Mauges and Villedieu-la-Blouère. Beaupréau is the municipal seat.

== History ==
The Hôtel de Ville was completed in 1959.

== Population ==
Historical population
Year	Pop.	±% p.a.
1968	16,969	—
1975	17,989	+0.84%
1982	19,502	+1.16%
1990	20,066	+0.36%
1999	20,262	+0.11%
2007	21,296	+0.62%
2012	22,385	+1.00%
2017	23,228	+0.74%
2023	23,989	+0.54%
Populations of the area corresponding with the commune of Beaupréau-en-Mauges at 1 January 2025, INSEE

== See also ==
- Communes of the Maine-et-Loire department
