= Mauges-sur-Loire =

- Commune
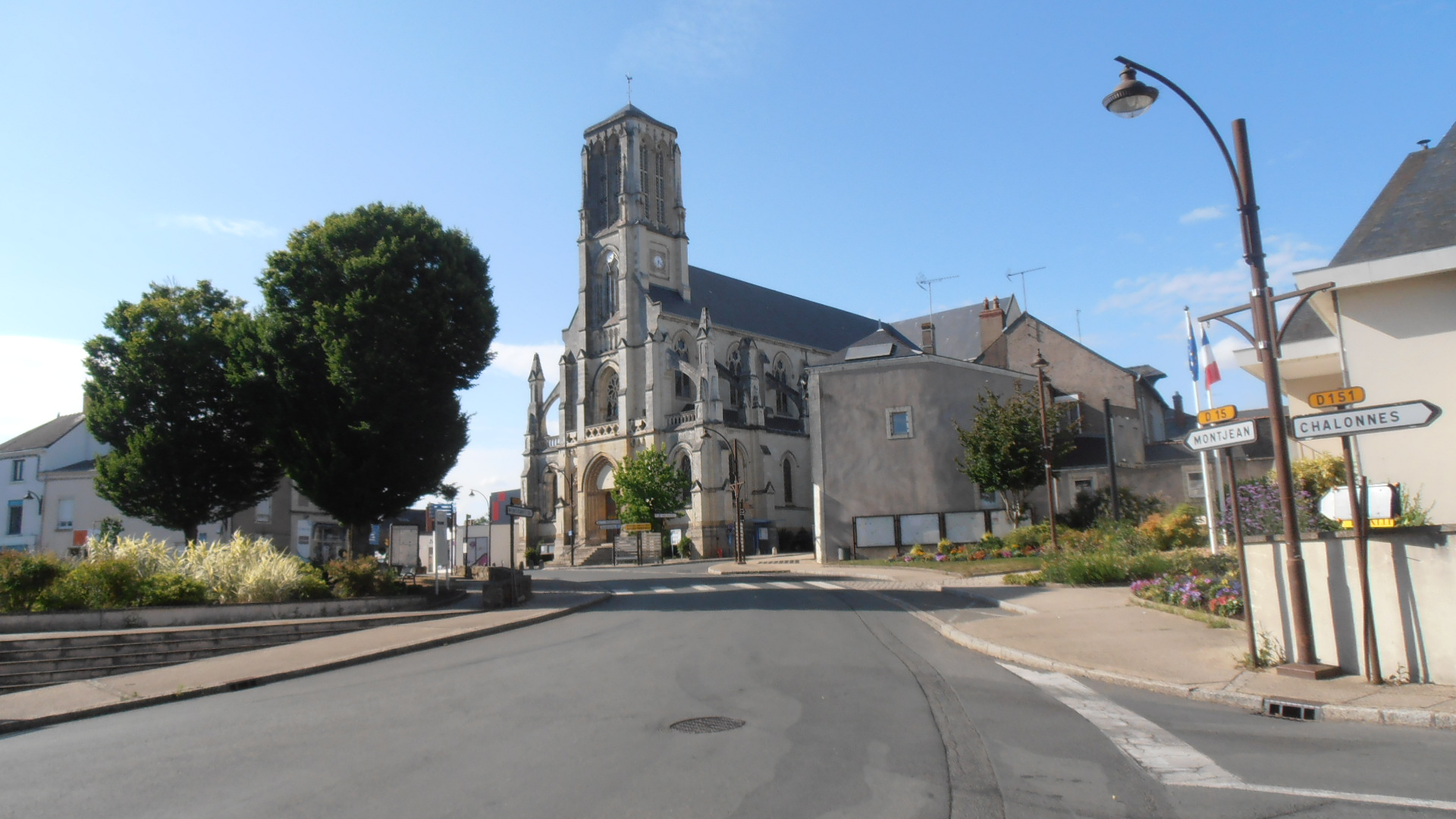
- The centre of the village of La Pommeraye with the church and the town hall on the right
- Location of Mauges-sur-Loire
- Location within France Location within Pays de la Loire
- Coordinates: 47°21′25″N 0°51′40″W
- Country: France
- Region: Pays de la Loire
- Department: Maine-et-Loire
- Arrondissement: Cholet
- Canton: Mauges-sur-Loire
- Intercommunality: Mauges Communauté

Government
  - Mayor (2020–2026): Gilles Piton
- Area^{1}: 191.84 km^{2} (74.07 sq mi)
- Population (2023): 18,695
  - Density: 97.451/km^{2} (252.40/sq mi)
- Time zone: UTC+01:00 (CET)
  - Summer (DST): UTC+02:00 (CEST)
- INSEE/Postal code: 49244 /49620, 49410, 49110, 49290, 49570
- ^{1} French Land Register data, which excludes lakes, ponds, glaciers > 1 km^{2} (0.386 sq mi or 247 acres) and river estuaries.

Mauges-sur-Loire (French pronunciation: [moʒ syʁ lwaʁ], literally Mauges on Loire) is a commune in the Maine-et-Loire department of western France. La Pommeraye is the municipal seat.

== History ==
It was established on 15 December 2015 and consists of the former communes of Beausse, Botz-en-Mauges, Bourgneuf-en-Mauges, La Chapelle-Saint-Florent, Le Marillais, Le Mesnil-en-Vallée, Montjean-sur-Loire, La Pommeraye, Saint-Florent-le-Vieil, Saint-Laurent-de-la-Plaine and Saint-Laurent-du-Mottay.

== Population ==
Historical population
Year	Pop.	±% p.a.
1968	13,995	—
1975	14,428	+0.44%
1982	15,340	+0.88%
1990	15,541	+0.16%
1999	15,880	+0.24%
2007	17,233	+1.03%
2012	18,153	+1.05%
2017	18,284	+0.14%
2023	18,695	+0.37%
Populations of the area corresponding with the commune of Mauges-sur-Loire at 1 January 2025. Source: INSEE

== See also ==
- Communes of the Maine-et-Loire department
