= Florentius of Anjou =

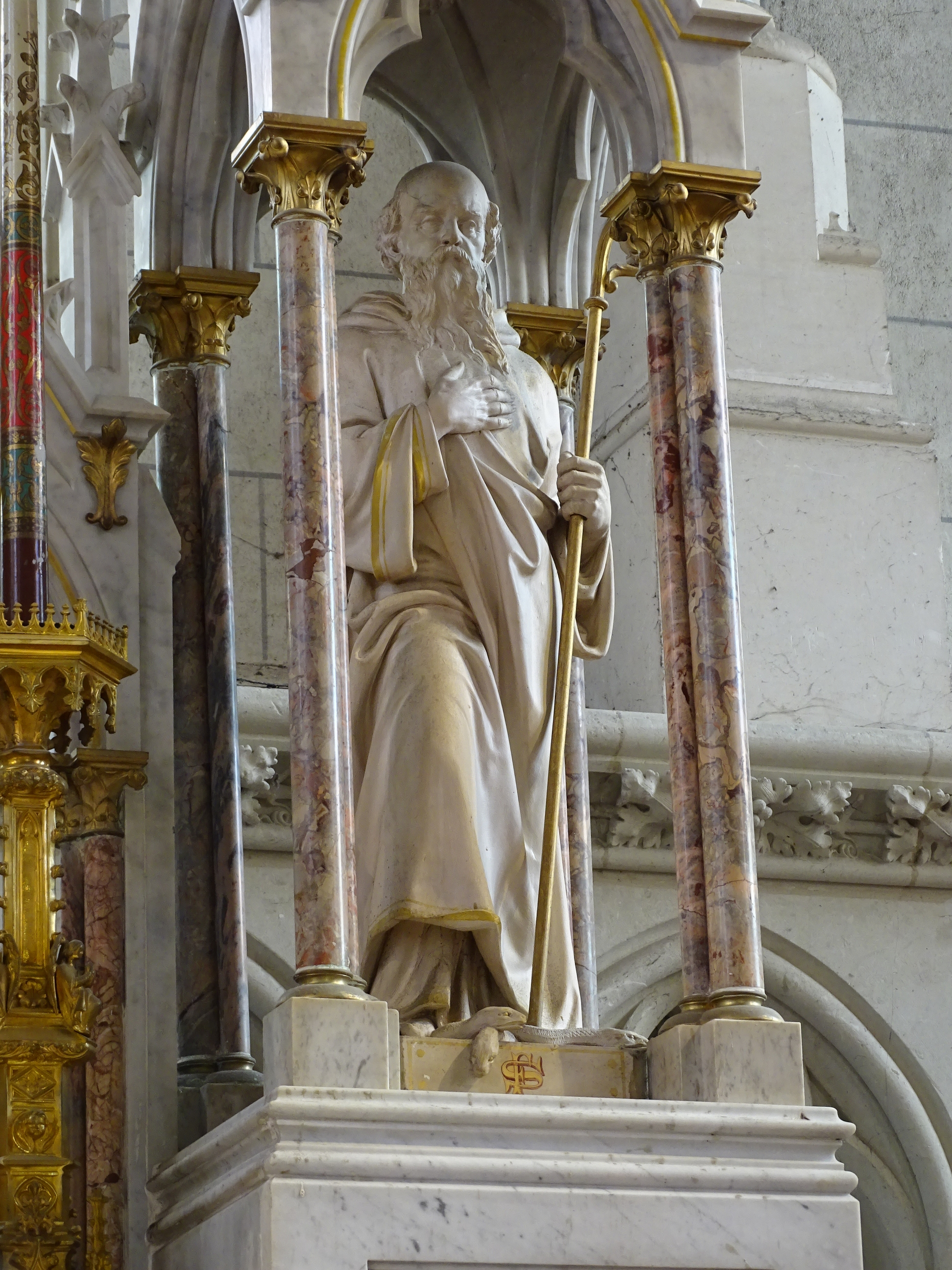
Statue of the saint in the abbey church at Saint-Florent-le-Vieil.

Florentius of Anjou (French - Florent d'Anjou) was a 4th century Christian hermit, priest, abbot and saint. According to legend he evangelised the region around Saumur and was brother to Florain of Lorch. The Angevin monasteries of Saint-Florent-le-Vieil (formerly Mont-Glonne and now in Saint-Florent-le-Vieil) and Saint Florent-le-Jeune (now in Saint-Hilaire-Saint-Florent) and the collegiate church in Roye, Somme are all named after him. The abbey of Saint-Florent in Saumur commissioned a tapestry around 1524 showing scenes from the saint's life, still held in Saumur.

It is difficult to find historically trustworthy sources on him. It seems he was initially a hermit living on the île d'Yeu in the 4th century. So many disciples gathered around him there that he established a monastery. His feast day is 22 September, recorded as the day of his burial on Mont Glonne, now in the town of Saint-Florent-le-Vieil. Over time a pilgrimage to his tomb developed and the monks rewrote his biography around the end of the 900s to make his sanctity and influence more popular.

== Hagiography ==
Several versions of his legend survive since it was rewritten several times. It states that Saint Florian was Saint Florentius' brother and that they grew up together on the banks of the Danube before becoming Roman soldiers. The prefect Aquilianus tortured them and then condemned them to death by drowing in the Enns with stones hung round their necks, both for refusing to sacrifice to idols. However, en route to the execution site, an angel appeared to Florentius and asked him to go to join Saint Martin in Tours, which he did, leaving his brother to his martyrdom. Forewarned by an angel, Martin ordained Florentius a priest on arrival. Mont Glonne was then infested with serpents and so Florentius went there to expel them and evangelise that place. · The dragons are here to be interpreted as a symbol of pagan customs.

He then travelled widely and carried out many miracles. The best known was saving a child from drowning at Candes - it had been at the bottom of the river for three days but he miraculously revived it and gave its blind mother back her sight. He also made a dragon terrorising the area around Saumur flee and never return solely by prayer. The legend states he died on 30 September 390 near mont Glonne at a very old age.

The Benedictines and all specialists find the legend fanciful. Historians attribute little historical importance to it, but allow that it may have some symbolic significance (e.g. a dragon representing a plague or epidemic affecting the region.

== Relics ==
The saint's remains were buried in a small chapel in the monastery on Mont Glonne. In 853, during the Viking invasions, the monastery's monks fled into the Berry, then to Saint-Gondon and to Tournus. The monks of Tournus refused to give up Saint Florentius' relics, but the monk Absalon managed to steal them and take refuge in the county of Anjou in a grotto at Montsoreau on the banks of the Loire. He then brought them to a site near the château de Saumur where a new abbey (known as Saint-Florent-le-Jeune to differentiate it from the abbey of Mont Glonne, now known as Saint-Florent-le-Vieil) was founded. It was destroyed by fire in 1022, then destroyed again when Saumur was captured in 1025 by Foulques Nerra. The count of Vermandois seized the relics in 1077 and moved them to Roye near Amiens.

In 1475 Louis XI decided to move the relics back to Saumur, giving the abbey there a reliquary, but they were seized en route by the people of Noyant, who kept them for five years. The Parliament of Paris decided to split the relics in half in 1496, one half going to Saint-George de Roye and the other half for Saint-Florent-le-Jeune.

The Protestants destroyed the reliquary in Saumur in 1562, but its contents were saved, only to disappear during the French Revolution. Some of the bones which had been kept at Saint-George de Roye were moved into the crypt of the church of Saint-Florent-le-Vieil in 1850. The relics still in Roye are now in the church of Saint-Pierre.

== Bibliography ==
- (in French) Port, Célestin (1978) [1876]. Dictionnaire historique, géographique et biographique de Maine-et-Loire et de l'ancienne province d'Anjou, revised by Jacques Levron, Pierre d'Herbécourt, Robert Favreau and Cécile Souchon - D-M. Vol. 2 (2 ed.). Angers: H. Siraudeau et Cie. p. 149-150. BnF 34649310.

== External links (in French) ==
- Saint Florent, Nominis
- Vie et légende du Saint, mythofrancaise.asso.fr
- Trois scènes de la tapisserie relatant les vies des saints Florian et Florent
- Descriptif de la tenture de la Vie de saint Florian et saint Florent, chefs-d'œuvre de la Renaissance Angers-Le Mans, pp. 18-21, Issuu
