= La Pommeraye, Maine-et-Loire =

La Pommeraye
- Part of Mauges-sur-Loire
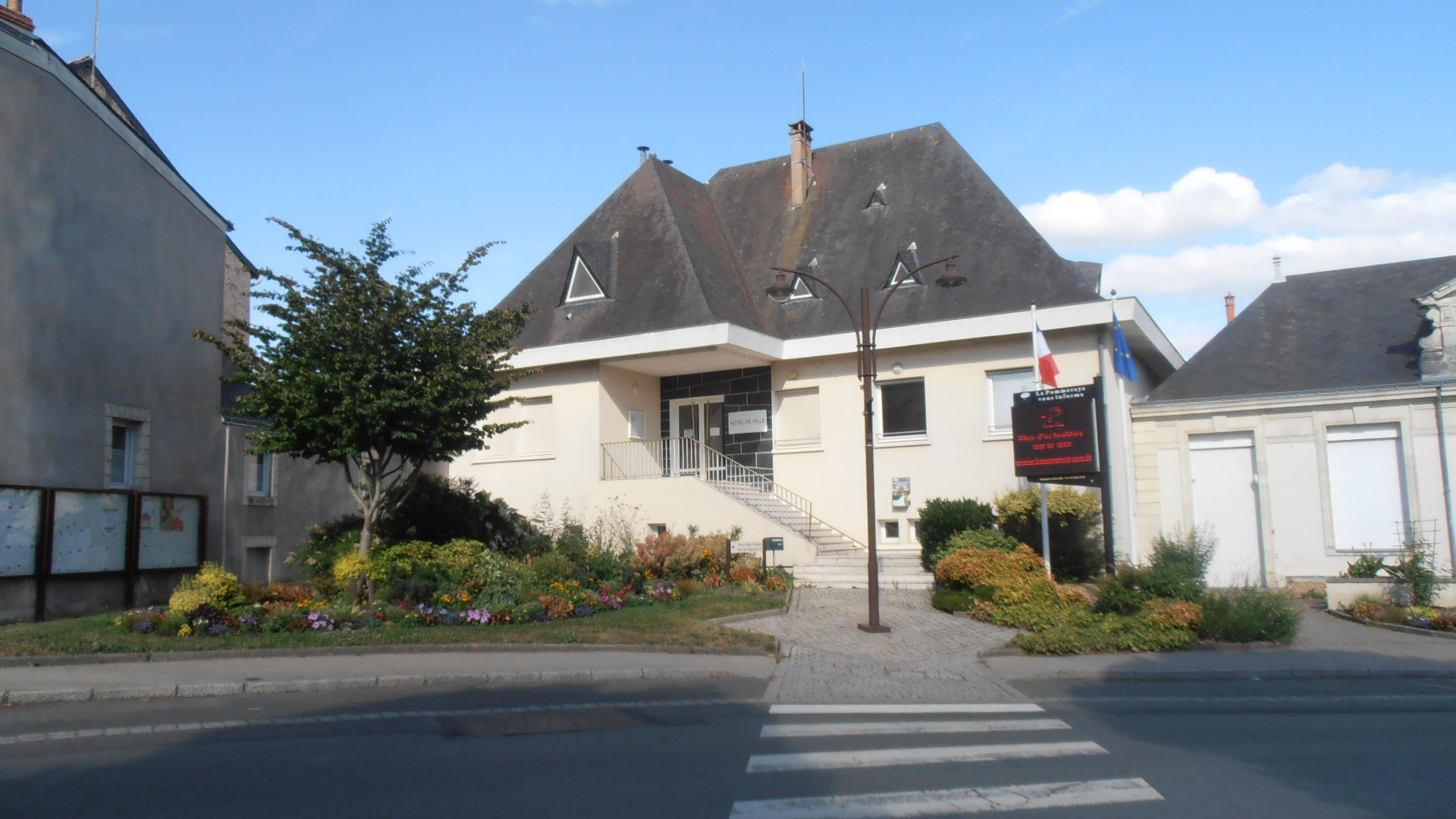
- Town hall of La Pommeraye, Maine-et-Loire

- Coat of arms
- Location of La Pommeraye
- Location within France Location within Pays de la Loire
- Coordinates: 47°21′21″N 0°51′33″W
- Country: France
- Region: Pays de la Loire
- Department: Maine-et-Loire
- Arrondissement: Cholet
- Canton: Saint-Florent-le-Vieil
- Commune: Mauges-sur-Loire
- Area^{1}: 39.49 km^{2} (15.25 sq mi)
- Elevation: 78 m (256 ft)
- Highest elevation: 174 m (571 ft)
- Lowest elevation: 12 m (39 ft)
- Population (2022): 3,902
  - Density: 98.81/km^{2} (255.9/sq mi)
- Demonym(s): Pommeréyen, Pommeréyenne
- Time zone: UTC+01:00 (CET)
  - Summer (DST): UTC+02:00 (CEST)
- Postal code: 49620
- ^{1} French Land Register data, which excludes lakes, ponds, glaciers > 1 km^{2} (0.386 sq mi or 247 acres) and river estuaries.

La Pommeraye (French pronunciation: [la pɔmʁɛ]) is a former commune in the Maine-et-Loire department in western France. On 15 December 2015, it was merged into the new commune Mauges-sur-Loire.

== See also ==
- Communes of the Maine-et-Loire department
