= Èvre =

River in France

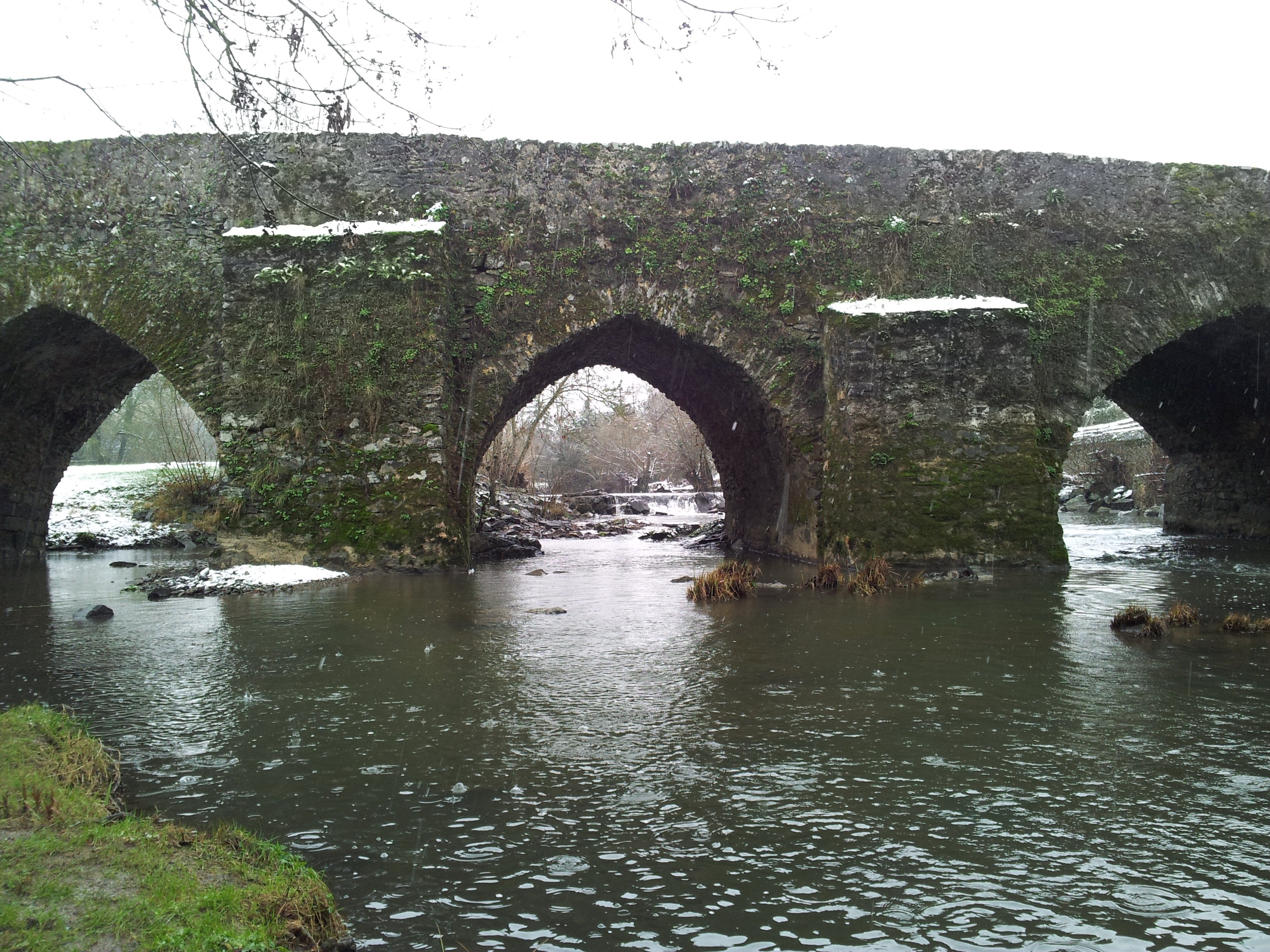
- The Èvre in Montrevault

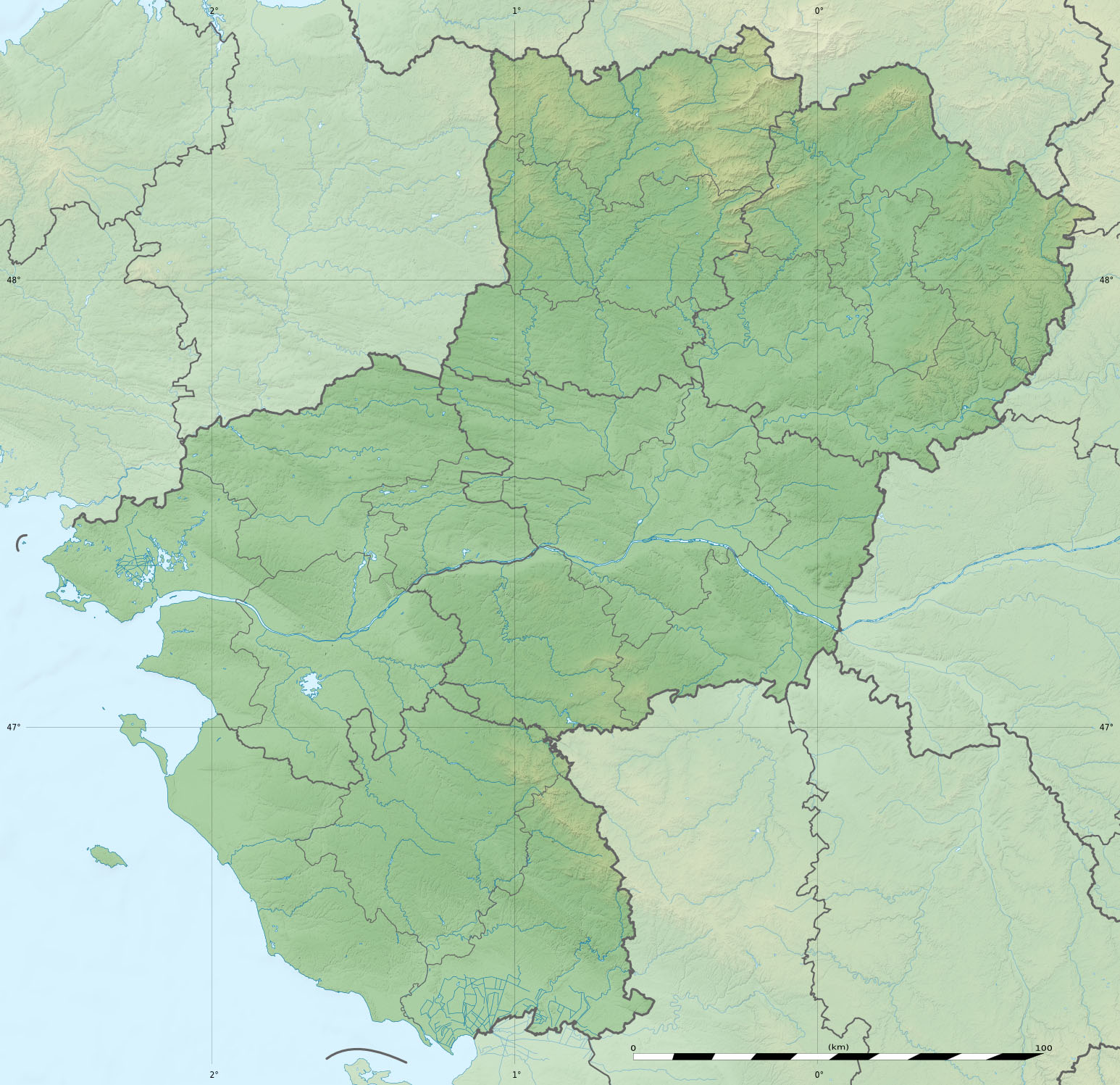
- Location within France Location within Pays de la Loire
- Native name: L'Èvre (French)

Location
- Country: France

Physical characteristics
- Source
  - location: Vezins
  - coordinates: 47°07′50″N 00°41′39″W
  - elevation: 161 m (528 ft)
- Mouth
  - location: Loire
  - coordinates: 47°21′49″N 1°02′00″W
  - elevation: 10 m (33 ft)
- Length: 91.8 km (57.0 mi)
- Basin size: 573 km^{2} (221 sq mi)
- Discharge
  - average: 3.38 m^{3}/s (119 cu ft/s)

Basin features
- Progression: Loire→ Atlantic Ocean

The Èvre (French pronunciation: [ɛvʁ]) is a 91.8 km (57.0 mi) long river in western France, left tributary of the Loire. Its source is at Vezins, 1.5 km (0.93 mi) northeast of the village. It flows into the Loire at Le Marillais, 3 km (1.9 mi) east of the village.

The Èvre flows through the following communes in the Maine-et-Loire département, ordered from source to mouth: Vezins, La Tourlandry, Trémentines, Le May-sur-Èvre, La Jubaudière, Jallais, La Poitevinière, Beaupréau, La Chapelle-du-Genêt, Le Fief-Sauvin, Montrevault, Saint-Pierre-Montlimart, Saint-Rémy-en-Mauges, La Boissière-sur-Èvre, La Chapelle-Saint-Florent, Botz-en-Mauges, Saint-Florent-le-Vieil, Le Marillais
