= Bourgneuf-en-Mauges =

- Part of Mauges-sur-Loire
- Location of Bourgneuf-en-Mauges
- Location within France Location within Pays de la Loire
- Coordinates: 47°18′49″N 0°50′02″W
- Country: France
- Region: Pays de la Loire
- Department: Maine-et-Loire
- Arrondissement: Cholet
- Canton: Saint-Florent-le-Vieil
- Commune: Mauges-sur-Loire
- Area^{1}: 11.64 km^{2} (4.49 sq mi)
- Elevation: 111 m (364 ft)
- Highest elevation: 152 m (499 ft)
- Lowest elevation: 80 m (260 ft)
- Population (2023): 701
  - Density: 60.2/km^{2} (156/sq mi)
- Time zone: UTC+01:00 (CET)
  - Summer (DST): UTC+02:00 (CEST)
- Postal code: 49290
- ^{1} French Land Register data, which excludes lakes, ponds, glaciers > 1 km^{2} (0.386 sq mi or 247 acres) and river estuaries.

Bourgneuf-en-Mauges (French pronunciation: [buʁnœf ɑ̃ moʒ]) is a former commune in the Maine-et-Loire department in western France. On 15 December 2015, it was merged into the new commune Mauges-sur-Loire.

== See also ==
- Communes of the Maine-et-Loire department
