= Hôtel de Ville, Beaupréau-en-Mauges =

Town hall in Beaupréau-en-Mauges, France

Hôtel de Ville
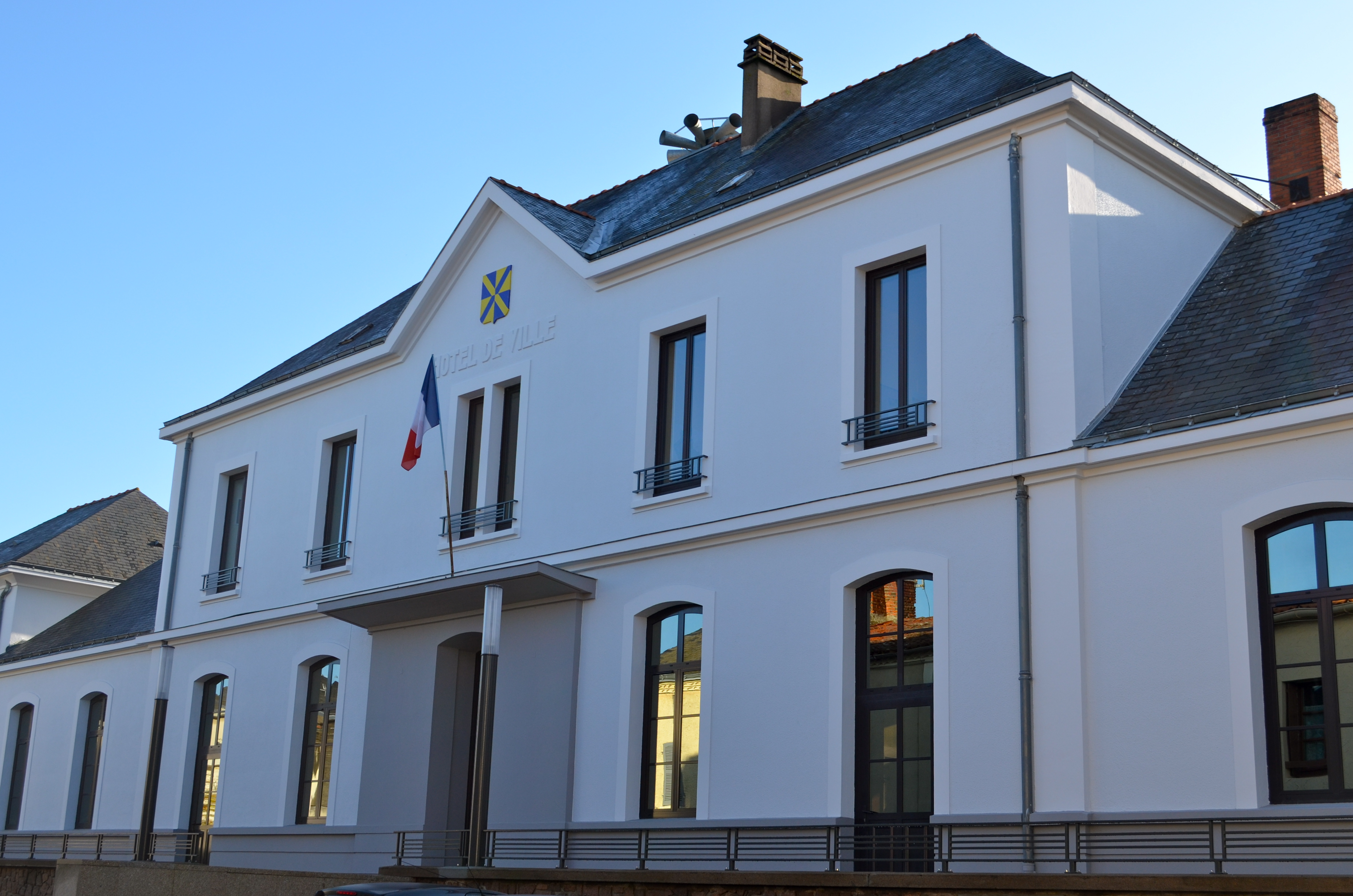
- The main frontage of the Hôtel de Ville in October 2011
- Interactive map of the Hôtel de Ville area

General information
- Type: City hall
- Architectural style: Neoclassical style
- Location: Beaupréau-en-Mauges, France
- Coordinates: 47.2013°N 0.9918°W
- Completed: 1959

The Hôtel de Ville (French pronunciation: [otɛl də vil], City Hall) is a municipal building in Beaupréau-en-Mauges, Maine-et-Loire, in western France, standing on Rue Notre-Dame.

== History ==
Following the French Revolution, the town council of Beaupréau initially held their meetings in the home of the mayor at the time. This arrangement continued until the mid-19th century when the council decided to establish its own town hall. The building they selected was the old sub-prefecture building in Rue de la Poterne. The building had been commissioned by the seigneur of Mesnil-Bouteille as his private residence in the 15th century. After changing ownership several times over the subsequent three centuries, it was acquired by the sub-prefecture in 1824. The building was subsequently remodelled to a design by François Villiers for sub-prefecture use. The design involved an austere three-storey structure of seven bays facing onto the street. After the sub-prefecture moved to Cholet in 1857, the building became vacant and the council acquired it in 1864.

After German troops occupied the town in June 1940, during the Second World War, the building was used a command post. It remained under German control until the town was liberated by the 3rd Parachute Chasseur Regiment on 31 August 1944. After the building was no longer required for municipal use, it became a school and was later converted for residential use.

In the 1950s, after substantial population growth, the council led by the mayor, Henry de Gontaut-Biron, decided to establish a more substantial town hall. The site they selected, on Rue Notre-Dame, had been occupied by the old Church of Notre-Dame, before it moved to its current site in 1857. The new building was designed in the neoclassical style, built in brick with a cement render finish and was completed in December 1959.

The new building was laid out as a two-storey main block with single-storey wings of two bays each. The design of the main block involved a symmetrical main frontage of five bays facing onto the street. The central bay featured a segmental-headed doorway with a canopy on the ground floor, a bi-partite window on the first floor and an open pediment above. The rest of the building was fenestrated by segmental-headed windows on the ground floor and by square-headed windows on the first floor. After a visit by the prime minister, Raymond Barre, in 1978, the building was extended to the northeast with a modern public entrance: the extension was opened by the President of the Senate, Alain Poher, in August 1985.

Internally, the principal rooms were the Salle du Conseil (council chamber) and the Salle des Mariages (wedding room). Following completion of an extensive programme of refurbishment works, these two rooms were reopened by the mayor, Gérard Chevalier, in May 2009.
