= Canton of Beaupréau-en-Mauges =

Coordinates: 47°10′51″N 0°57′40″W

Beaupréau
- Canton
- Interactive map of Beaupréau
- Country: France
- Region: Pays de la Loire
- Department: Maine-et-Loire
- No. of communes: {{{nbcomm}}}
- Area: 443.92 km^{2} (171.40 sq mi)
- Population (2023): 41,825
  - Density: 94.217/km^{2} (244.02/sq mi)
- INSEE code: 4909

Canton of Beaupréau-en-Mauges (before March 2020: canton of Beaupréau) is a canton of France, located in the Maine-et-Loire department, in the Pays de la Loire region. At the French canton reorganisation which came into effect in March 2015, the canton was expanded from 12 to 22 communes (21 of which merged into the new communes of Beaupréau-en-Mauges and Montrevault-sur-Èvre in December 2015):

- Beaupréau-en-Mauges
- Bégrolles-en-Mauges
- Montrevault-sur-Èvre

== See also ==
- Arrondissement of Cholet
- Cantons of the Maine-et-Loire department
- Communes of the Maine-et-Loire department
